= Budget Day =

Ceremonial presentation of a government budget

Budget Day is the day that a government presents its budget to a legislature for approval, in a ceremonial fashion. It only exists in some countries of the world.

== United Kingdom ==
In the United Kingdom, Budget Day is the day that the Chancellor of the Exchequer delivers the annual budget, first privately to the Cabinet and then publicly in a speech to the House of Commons. It is always aligned with the fiscal year, which itself in the UK is still aligned with the Julian Calendar. Budget Day formerly occurred on a Wednesday in March, before the start of the new fiscal year, although in the early 20th century it was delivered in April, after the start of the fiscal year. However, former chancellor Philip Hammond announced in the 2016 Autumn Statement that the budget would, from 2018, be moved to October as an 'autumn budget', and the statement moved to March, but as a less important convention. The last time the budget was held in the autumn to this timing came from 1993 to 1996, when Budget Day was also shifted from spring to autumn.

Chancellors have had varying opinions on Budget Day. Nigel Lawson wrote, in his memoirs, that it is "best described as an enjoyable ordeal". Harold Macmillan, in explaining his surprise at being appointed Chancellor, said that he thought Budget Day to be "rather like a school Speech Day: a bit of a bore, but there it is".

=== Preparation ===
The Chancellor, Treasury ministers, and officials will have been working on the Budget some time in advance of Budget Day. Geoffrey Howe initiated the tradition of a weekend meeting, for all Treasury ministers and officials, outside London and some time in advance of Budget Day, for discussing the Budget. This meeting is now a customary part of the annual Budget preparations.

=== Presentation to the monarch ===
The monarch is the first person to be told of the Budget. Queen Elizabeth II customarily invited the Chancellor to dinner the day before Budget Day, where she was given an outline of the Budget.

=== Presentation to the Cabinet ===
The Budget is presented to the Cabinet before being presented to Parliament. Formally, the Cabinet has power to amend the Budget. In practice, however, this is made impossible by the fact that the Budget Cabinet meets on the very morning of Budget Day itself, far too late for any but very minor changes to be effected. The Budget is presented to the Cabinet largely as a fait accompli by the Chancellor, the various junior Treasury ministers, and the Prime Minister (in the role of the First Lord of the Treasury).

This swiftness is justified on the grounds of secrecy. It is considered essential the budget details not leak before the Chancellor's public speech. (In 1936, James Henry Thomas famously leaked Budget details after the Budget Cabinet, which at the time was being held five days before Budget Day, which had been until that point the traditional period between the Budget Cabinet and Budget Day itself.) Little objection has apparently been raised by the Cabinet to this. The only times that the Budget Cabinet has raised objections causing last-minute amendment to the Budget have been:

1945
Hugh Dalton removed a proposal to change the tax on fuel oil.
1951
Hugh Gaitskell responded to Cabinet pressure and abandoned his plans for a differential fuel tax.
1962
Cabinet persuaded Selwyn Lloyd to announce the early abolition of the tax on home owner-occupiers.
1981
The so-called "wets" in the Cabinet persuaded Geoffrey Howe to increase the state pension in line with inflation, which he had not wanted to do. (Margaret Thatcher recorded in her memoirs that "[t]he dissenters in the Cabinet ... had been stunned by the budget when they learnt its contents".)

=== The Chancellor's Speech and debate ===
The Chancellor's Speech in the House is given immediately after what is usually a somewhat lacklustre Prime Minister's Question Time, it being largely overshadowed by what is seen as the main parliamentary event of the day, now usually around 12:30 but previously about 15:30. Nigel Lawson reports that after the press photo-call at 15:15, where like all chancellors he would hold the red dispatch box, purportedly containing the budget speech,^{N1} aloft; he used to spend time in his room, just behind the Speaker's chair, collecting his thoughts, before entering the house at 15:25, usually to the sound of "a roar from the Government benches". The debate is customarily presided over by the Chairman of Ways and Means instead of the Speaker.

It has varied in length over the years. Macmillan remarked that he "would try not to prolong the agony", and once opined of the speech that he did not think it "necessary to start with the usual long review of the events of the last financial year". The longest continuous budget speech was delivered by William Ewart Gladstone on 18 April 1853 and lasted 4 hours and 45 minutes. The shortest was given by Benjamin Disraeli in 1867 and lasted 45 minutes.

It is also a parliamentary tradition that while making the Budget Speech the Chancellor may drink whatever they wish, including alcohol which is otherwise forbidden. Past chancellors have opted for whisky (Kenneth Clarke), gin and tonic (Geoffrey Howe), brandy and water (Benjamin Disraeli), spritzer (Nigel Lawson) and sherry and beaten egg (William Ewart Gladstone). In the last 25 years, this tradition has fallen away, with Gordon Brown and subsequent chancellors opting for water.

The speech is followed by a debate, which can last for several days. In theory, the report and the financial proposals that the Chancellor sets out in the speech are immediately considered and debated by the House, with the Chancellor in attendance to respond to arguments and, occasionally, to amend proposals. Young reports one Member of Parliament observing that Chancellors customarily "keep up their sleeves one or two million pounds which they propose to give away in concessions during the course of the Finance Bill debates".

In practice, practical concerns dictate otherwise. Nigel Lawson reports, "[as] soon as MPs realise that the tax announcements are over they dash out of the Chamber to get their copies of the Financial Statement and Budget Report – the 'Red Book'".

Similarly, there is a rush by the news services to report Budget items. Young observed in the 1960s that newspapers were "on the street, within minutes it seemed, bringing the glad tidings: TUPPENCE OFF BEER. INCOME TAX DOWN.". Since Parliament has been televised, TV news services have broadcast the Chancellor's speech live, as a "Budget special".

=== Evening broadcast ===
Between 1952 and 2011, the Chancellor would, in the evening of Budget Day, make a television party political broadcast about the budget. Similar broadcasts were made, in response, by representatives of the major Opposition parties. All broadcasts were arranged through the normal parliamentary processes for arranging party election broadcasts.

This tradition was discontinued, starting with the 2012 budget, as part of wider changes to the scheduling of party political broadcasts. The BBC defended its decision, saying that they originated from a time where filming the Budget Statement from inside the House of Commons was not possible, and the public would be able to access the information from various other outlets.

==== List of Budget broadcasts ====
1950s
| Budget | Date | Chancellor | Party | Date | Shadow Chancellor | Party | Ref |
|---|---|---|---|---|---|---|---|
| 1953 | 16 April | R. A. Butler | Conservative | 17 April | Hugh Gaitskell | Labour | |
| 1954 | 8 April | R. A. Butler | Conservative | 9 April | Hugh Gaitskell | Labour | |
| 1955 | 21 April | R. A. Butler | Conservative | 22 April | Hugh Gaitskell | Labour | |
| 1956 | 18 April | Harold Macmillan | Conservative | 19 April | Harold Wilson | Labour | |
| 1957 | 9 April | Peter Thorneycroft | Conservative | 10 April | Harold Wilson | Labour | |
| 1958 | 15 April | Derick Heathcoat-Amory | Conservative | 16 April | Harold Wilson | Labour | |
| 1959 | 7 April | Derick Heathcoat-Amory | Conservative | 8 April | Harold Wilson | Labour | |

1960s
| Budget | Date | Chancellor | Party | Date | Shadow Chancellor | Party | Ref |
|---|---|---|---|---|---|---|---|
| 1960 | 4 April | Derick Heathcoat-Amory | Conservative | 5 April | Harold Wilson | Labour | |
| 1961 | 17 April | Selwyn Lloyd | Conservative | 18 April | Harold Wilson | Labour | |
| 1962 | 9 April | Selwyn Lloyd | Conservative | 10 April | James Callaghan | Labour | |
| 1963 | 3 April | Reginald Maudling | Conservative | 4 April | James Callaghan | Labour | |
| 1964 | 14 April | Reginald Maudling | Conservative | 15 April | James Callaghan | Labour | |
| 1965 | 6 April | James Callaghan | Labour | 7 April | Edward Heath | Conservative | |
| 1966 | 3 May | James Callaghan | Labour | 4 May | Ian Macleod | Conservative | |
| 1967 | 11 April | James Callaghan | Labour | 12 April | Ian Macleod | Conservative | |
| 1968 | 19 March | Roy Jenkins | Labour | 20 March | Ian Macleod | Conservative | |
| 1969 | 15 April | Roy Jenkins | Labour | 16 April | Ian Macleod | Conservative | |

1970s
| Budget | Date | Chancellor | Party | Date | Shadow Chancellor | Party | Ref |
|---|---|---|---|---|---|---|---|
| 1970 | 14 April | Roy Jenkins | Labour | 15 April | Ian Macleod | Conservative | |
| 1971 | 30 March | Anthony Barber | Conservative | 31 March | Roy Jenkins | Labour | |
| 1972 | 21 March | Anthony Barber | Conservative | 22 March | Roy Jenkins | Labour | |
| 1973 | 6 March | Anthony Barber | Conservative | 7 March | Denis Healey | Labour | |
| Mar 1974 | 26 March | Denis Healey | Labour | 27 March | Robert Carr | Conservative | |
| Nov 1974 | 12 November | Denis Healey | Labour | 13 November | Robert Carr | Conservative | |
| 1975 | 15 April | Denis Healey | Labour | 16 April | Geoffrey Howe | Conservative | |
| 1976 | 6 April | Denis Healey | Labour | 7 April | Geoffrey Howe | Conservative | |
| 1977 | 29 March | Denis Healey | Labour | 30 March | Geoffrey Howe | Conservative | |
| 1978 | 11 April | Denis Healey | Labour | 12 April | Geoffrey Howe | Conservative | |
| Apr 1979 | 3 April | Denis Healey | Labour | 4 April | Geoffrey Howe | Conservative | |
| Jun 1979 | 12 June | Geoffrey Howe | Conservative | 13 June | Denis Healey | Labour | |

1980s
| Budget | Date | Chancellor | Party | Date | Shadow Chancellor | Party | Ref | | | |
|---|---|---|---|---|---|---|---|---|---|---|
| 1980 | 26 March | Geoffrey Howe | Conservative | 27 March | Denis Healey | Labour | | | | |
| 1981 | 10 March | Geoffrey Howe | Conservative | 11 March | Peter Shore | Labour | | | | |
| 1982 | 9 March | Geoffrey Howe | Conservative | 10 March | Peter Shore | Labour | | | | |
| 1983 | 15 March | Geoffrey Howe | Conservative | 16 March | Peter Shore | Labour | | | | |
| Budget | Date | Chancellor | Party | Date | Shadow Chancellor | Party | Date | Spokesperson | Party | Ref |
| 1984 | 13 March | Nigel Lawson | Conservative | 14 March | Roy Hattersley | Labour | 15 March | Roy Jenkins | SDP-Liberal Alliance | |
| 1985 | 19 March | Nigel Lawson | Conservative | 20 March | Roy Hattersley | Labour | 21 March | David Steel | SDP-Liberal Alliance | |
| 1986 | 18 March | Nigel Lawson | Conservative | 19 March | Roy Hattersley | Labour | 20 March | Roy Jenkins | SDP-Liberal Alliance | |
| 1987 | 17 March | Nigel Lawson | Conservative | 18 March | Roy Hattersley | Labour | 19 March | Roy Jenkins | SDP-Liberal Alliance | |
| 1988 | 15 March | Nigel Lawson | Conservative | 16 March | John Smith | Labour | 17 March | Alan Beith | SDP-Liberal Alliance | |
| 1989 | 14 March | Nigel Lawson | Conservative | 15 March | John Smith | Labour | 16 March | Alan Beith | Social and Liberal Democrats | |

1990s
| Budget | Date | Chancellor | Party | Date | Shadow Chancellor | Party | Date | Spokesperson | Party | Ref |
|---|---|---|---|---|---|---|---|---|---|---|
| 1990 | 20 March | John Major | Conservative | 21 March | John Smith | Labour | 22 March | Alan Beith | Liberal Democrats | |
| 1991 | 19 March | Norman Lamont | Conservative | 20 March | John Smith | Labour | 21 March | Alan Beith | Liberal Democrats | |
| 1992 | 10 March | Norman Lamont | Conservative | 11 March | John Smith | Labour | 12 March | Alan Beith | Liberal Democrats | |
| Mar 1993 | 16 March | Norman Lamont | Conservative | 17 March | Gordon Brown | Labour | 18 March | Alan Beith | Liberal Democrats | |
| Nov 1993 | 30 November | Kenneth Clarke | Conservative | 1 December | Gordon Brown | Labour | 2 December | Alan Beith | Liberal Democrats | |
| 1994 | 29 November | Kenneth Clarke | Conservative | 30 November | Gordon Brown | Labour | 1 December | Malcolm Bruce | Liberal Democrats | |
| 1995 | 28 November | Kenneth Clarke | Conservative | 29 November | Gordon Brown | Labour | 30 November | Malcolm Bruce | Liberal Democrats | |
| 1996 | 26 November | Kenneth Clarke | Conservative | 27 November | Gordon Brown | Labour | 28 November | Malcolm Bruce | Liberal Democrats | |
| 1997 | 2 July | Gordon Brown | Labour | 3 July | Michael Heseltine | Conservative | 4 July | Malcolm Bruce | Liberal Democrats | |
| 1998 | 17 March | Gordon Brown | Labour | 18 March | Peter Lilley | Conservative | 19 March | Malcolm Bruce | Liberal Democrats | |
| 1999 | 9 March | Gordon Brown | Labour | 10 March | Francis Maude | Conservative | 11 March | Malcolm Bruce | Liberal Democrats | |

2000s
| Budget | Date | Chancellor | Party | Date | Shadow Chancellor | Party | Date | Spokesperson | Party | Ref |
|---|---|---|---|---|---|---|---|---|---|---|
| 2000 | 21 March | Gordon Brown | Labour | 22 March | Michael Portillo | Conservative | 23 March | Matthew Taylor | Liberal Democrats | |
| 2001 | 7 March | Gordon Brown | Labour | 8 March | Michael Portillo | Conservative | 9 March | Matthew Taylor | Liberal Democrats | |
| 2002 | 17 April | Gordon Brown | Labour | 18 April | Michael Howard | Conservative | 19 April | Matthew Taylor | Liberal Democrats | |
| 2003 | 9 April | Gordon Brown | Labour | 10 April | Michael Howard | Conservative | 11 April | Matthew Taylor | Liberal Democrats | |
| 2004 | 17 March | Gordon Brown | Labour | 18 March | Oliver Letwin | Conservative | 19 March | Vince Cable | Liberal Democrats | |
| 2005 | 16 March | Gordon Brown | Labour | 17 March | Oliver Letwin | Conservative | 18 March | Vince Cable | Liberal Democrats | |
| 2006 | 22 March | Gordon Brown | Labour | 23 March | George Osborne | Conservative | 24 March | Vince Cable | Liberal Democrats | |
| 2007 | 21 March | Gordon Brown | Labour | 22 March | George Osborne | Conservative | 23 March | Vince Cable | Liberal Democrats | |
| 2008 | 12 March | Alistair Darling | Labour | 13 March | George Osborne | Conservative | 14 March | Vince Cable | Liberal Democrats | |
| 2009 | 22 April | Alistair Darling | Labour | 23 April | George Osborne | Conservative | 24 April | Vince Cable | Liberal Democrats | |

2010s
| Budget | Date | Chancellor | Party | Date | Shadow Chancellor | Party | Date | Spokesperson | Party | Ref |
|---|---|---|---|---|---|---|---|---|---|---|
| March 2010 | 24 March | Alistair Darling | Labour | 25 March | George Osborne | Conservative | 26 March | Vince Cable | Liberal Democrats | |
| June 2010 | 22 June | George Osborne | Conservative | 23 June | Alistair Darling | Labour | The Liberal Democrats served in the coalition government, and did not broadcast a response to the budget during their time in office. | | | |
| 2011 | 23 March | George Osborne | Conservative | 23 March | Ed Balls | Labour | The Liberal Democrats served in the coalition government, and did not broadcast a response to the budget during their time in office. | | | |

=== Aftermath ===
The Finance Bill proper is only itself presented to Parliament some time after Budget Day, and is debated for days or even weeks afterwards. It is common for the bill to be passed, becoming the Finance Act, some time in late July. The Act back-dates its provisions, so that they take effect either from Budget Day itself or from the start of the fiscal year.

== Republic of Ireland ==
In the Republic of Ireland, Budget Day is the annual statement to the Dáil by the Minister for Finance, made in the first week of December. It sets out the budgetary targets for the following year and consists of (i) a Financial Statement to the Dáil, (ii) Budgetary Measures (a list of budgetary changes detailing the cost/yield of same), (iii) Budget Statistics and Tables and (iv) various financial resolutions.

The day itself is very similar to Budget Day in the United Kingdom. In the early afternoon, the Minister for Finance will normally hold a photocall in the car park of Leinster House, with the traditional budget briefcase (in recent years, a floppy disk or CD-ROM purportedly containing the contents of the Budget speech has often been used instead). At 15:45, the Minister for Finance presents the budget speech in Dáil Éireann. The speech, which lasts approximately one hour, is normally carried live on Raidió Teilifís Éireann radio and television. The speech contains the main taxation and other fiscal measures to be employed over the next calendar year. The Opposition Front Bench spokesperson on Finance normally replies to the Budget speech first, followed by the spokespersons on finance of other opposition parties. A vote on supply normally takes place before midnight on the night of the budget, with changes to excise duties on alcohol, tobacco, and petrol taking place from midnight. Most other measures are spelt out in greater detail in the Finance Bill which is introduced in the Oireachtas following the budget, eventually becoming the Finance Act.

== Netherlands ==
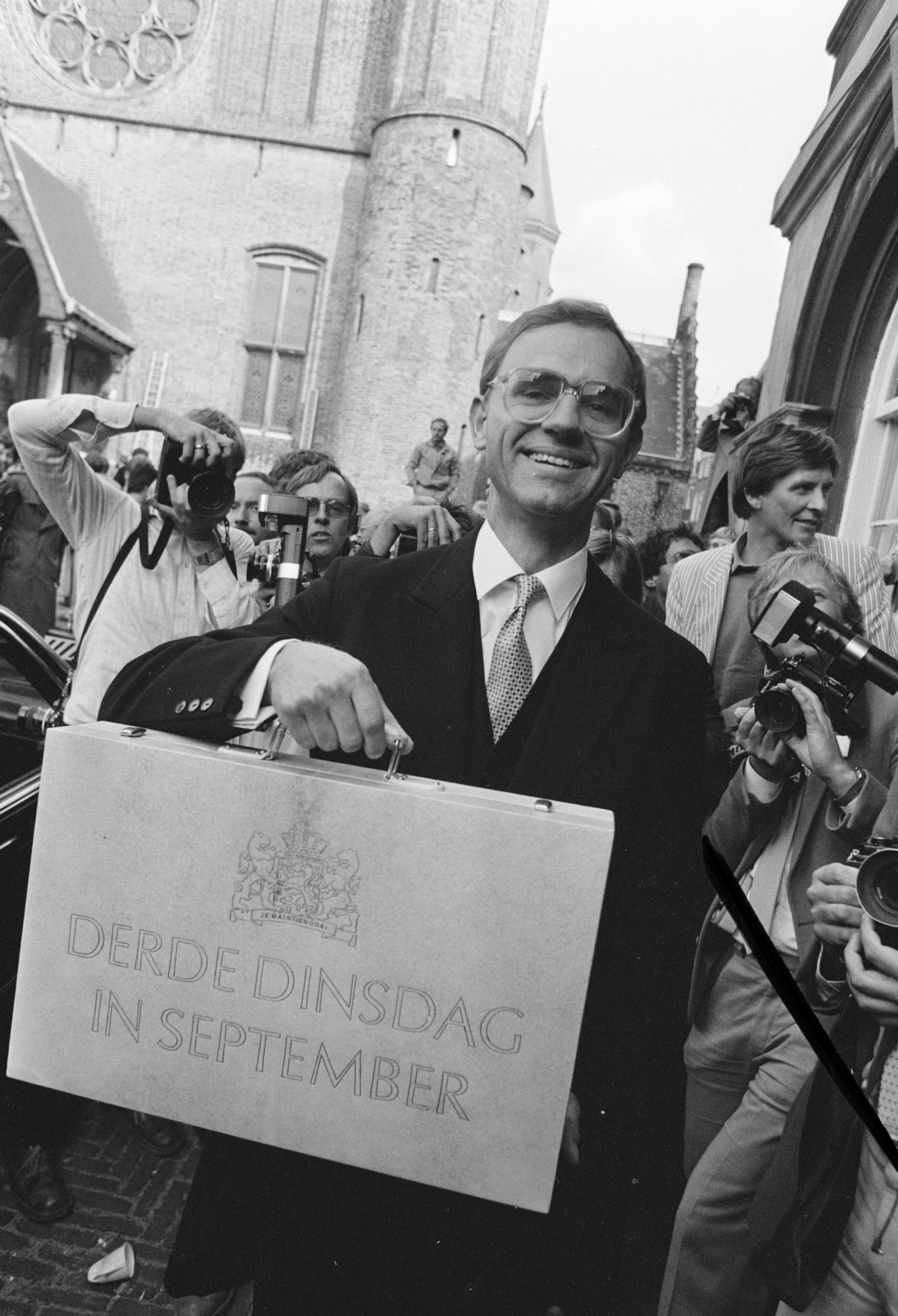
Minister of Finance Onno Ruding carrying the budget briefcase, Prinsjedag 1983

In the Netherlands, the presentation of the budget is made on the same day as when the monarch gives the speech from the throne; this is held on the third Tuesday of September, which is called Prinsjesdag (Little Princes' Day). After the monarch gives the speech from the throne, announcing the government's agenda for the coming year, the National Budget and the Budget Memorandum are presented later that day to the House of Representatives and are brought in a ceremonial briefcase by the minister of finance. This briefcase tradition was introduced in 1947 by Piet Lieftinck in imitation of the British tradition.

== Sweden ==
Budgetpromenaden, or the budget walk, is a traditional biannual procession when the Swedish finance minister walk with a copy of the budget bill from the Ministry of Finance to the Riksdag (the parliament), a distance of 400 metres (440 yd).

== Hong Kong ==
In Hong Kong the Financial Secretary introduces the appropriations bill for first reading a few weeks before the beginning of a fiscal year on 1 April, with a speech to move the motion for first reading of the bill. In 2002 the tradition for the Secretary for the Treasury to deliver a spending announcement was abolished. The budget day typically falls on a Wednesday in early March, but since 2000 it has been moved to a Wednesday in late February. A resolution for temporary appropriations is usually moved, since the third reading of the appropriations bill usually takes place after 1 April.

== India ==
The Union Budget of India, referred to as the Annual Financial Statement in Article 112 of the Constitution of India, is the annual budget of the Republic of India, presented each year on the very first day of February by the Finance Minister of India in Parliament. The budget, which is presented by means of the Finance Bill and the Appropriation bill has to be passed by the House before it can come into effect on 1 April, the start of India's financial year.

=== Pre-liberalisation ===
The first Union budget of independent India was presented by R. K. Shanmukham Chetty on 26 November 1947.

The Union budgets for the fiscal years 1959–61 to 1963–64, inclusive of the interim budget for 1962–63, were presented by Morarji Desai. On 29 February in 1964 and 1968, he became the only finance minister to present the Union budget on his birthday. Vyas presented budgets that included five annual budgets, an interim budget during his first stint and one interim budget and three final budgets in his second tenure when he was both the Finance Minister and Deputy Prime Minister of India.

After Desai's resignation, Indira Gandhi, the then Prime Minister of India, took over the Ministry of Finance to become the first woman to hold the post of the finance minister.

Pranab Mukherjee, the first Rajya Sabha member to hold the Finance portfolio, presented the annual budgets for 1982–83, 1983–84 and 1984–85.

Rajiv Gandhi presented the budget for 1987–89 after V P Singh quit his government, and in the process became only the third Prime Minister to present a budget after his mother and grandfather.

N. D. Tiwary presented the budget for 1988–89, S B Chavan for 1989–90, while Madhu Dandawate presented the Union budget for 1990–91.

Manmohan Singh became the Finance Minister but presented the interim budget for 1991–92 as elections were forced.

Due to political developments, early elections were held in May 1991 following which the Indian National Congress returned to political power and Singh, the Finance Minister, presented the budget for 1991–92.

=== Post-liberalisation ===
Manmohan Singh, in his next annual budgets from 1992 to 1993, opened the economy, encouraged foreign investments and reduced peak import duty from 300 plus per cent to 50 per cent.

After elections in 1996, a non-Congress ministry assumed office. Hence the final budget for 1996–97 was presented by P. Chidambaram, who then belonged to Tamil Maanila Congress.

Following a constitutional crisis when the I. K. Gujral Ministry was on its way out, a special session of Parliament was convened just to pass Chidambaram's 1997–98 budget. This budget was passed without a debate.

After the general elections in March 1998 that led to the Bharatiya Janata Party forming the central government, Yashwant Sinha, the then Finance Minister in this government, presented the interim and final budgets for 1998–99.

After general elections in 1999, Sinha again became the finance minister and presented four annual budgets from 1999 to 2000 to 2002–2003. Due to elections in May 2004, an interim budget was presented by Jaswant Singh.

=== Time of budget announcement ===
Until the year 2000, the Union Budget was announced at 5 pm on the last working day of the month of February. This practice was inherited from the Colonial Era when the British Parliament would pass the budget in the noon followed by India in the evening of the day. It was done because of the time difference between the two nations. When there is evening in India, Britain experiences morning. Therefore, the colonial government announced in the afternoon. By the time, it would be 28 or 29 February, UK would date 1 March.

It was Mr.Yashwant Sinha, the then Finance Minister of India in the NDA government (led by BJP) of Atal Bihari Vajpayee, who changed the ritual by announcing the 2001 Union Budget at 11 am.

=== Date of budget announcement ===
Until the year 2016, the Union Budget was presented in the Lok Sabha on the last working day of February.

It was Mr. Arun Jaitley, the Minister of Finance in the BJP led NDA Government under the Prime Ministership of Mr. Narendra Modi, who changed the date of the Annual Budget of 2017 to the first working day of February.

Additionally, the Railway Budget was also merged with the General Budget after 92 years in 2017.

== United States ==
The United States does not have a Budget Day. Instead the legislation that establishes the federal government's budget originates in the Congress, although the executive branch traditionally makes a proposal in advance.

== Footnotes ==
- ^N1 Famously, on one occasion the budget box of Norman Lamont (Chancellor 1990–1993) did not contain the speech. That was carried in a plastic bag held by his then Parliamentary Private Secretary, William Hague. The budget box contained a bottle of Highland Park whisky.
