= Ministerial broadcast =

Televised address to the British public

In the United Kingdom, a Ministerial Broadcast (also known as a Prime Ministerial Broadcast or Ministerial Statement) is a televised address to the public, usually given by the incumbent Prime Minister or other senior Cabinet Minister in times of national crisis. The BBC and other public service broadcasters must give the government air time if the circumstances are seen to be of sufficient importance, and requests from opposition leaders must also be considered.

== History ==
=== 1950s ===
The first Ministerial Broadcast was made by Prime Minister Anthony Eden on 27 April 1956, and broadcast on the BBC. It came several months after Eden's Conservative Party won the 1955 general election, which was the first time an election had received significant coverage on television. The address was different to a Party Political Broadcast, as the opposition parties were not allocated air-time as well. This was acceptable for non-controversial topics – the broadcast in April addressed the visit of Soviet leaders Nikita Khrushchev and Nikolai Bulganin – but in October 1956 Eden made a second televised speech relating to the Suez Crisis, to which the Leader of the Opposition Hugh Gaitskell demanded a reply. The BBC's guidelines on Ministerial Broadcasts had been published in 1947, and stated that:

They should deal with facts, explain legislation approved by parliament, or appeal for public co-operation.

If the opposition disagreed in any way with the government's broadcast (as Gaitskell did), they could ask permission to air a reply. In the case of the Suez Crisis, Eden refused to let Gaitskell give a reply, as he believed that the country should be united in times of conflict, and it would damage troops' morale if the government's efforts were put into question. The BBC Governors were then required to intervene, siding with Gaitskell, who was given permission to broadcast a reply. The Government were angry with the BBC's decision (especially as the BBC had earlier refused to let Australian Prime Minister Robert Menzies make a radio address in support of Eden due to fears of bias), and Eden threatened to cut the BBC's funding by £1 million, but after a protest from the Director-General of the BBC Ian Jacob and Chairman of the BBC Alexander Cadogan, the threat was eventually dropped.

Eden resigned as Prime Minister in January 1957 due to his poor handling of the Suez Crisis, and was succeeded by fellow Conservative Harold Macmillan. On 31 August 1959, Macmillan was joined by US President Dwight D. Eisenhower for a live television debate, the first of its kind. Eisenhower was on a tour of Europe, and discussed the need for global peace, as well as the Anglo-American relationship. There were initial concerns from Labour that the broadcast would affect their chances at the next general election, but these were withdrawn and the broadcast went ahead as planned.

=== 1960s ===
After Labour defeated the Conservatives (then led by Alec Douglas-Home) in the 1964 general election, the new prime minister Harold Wilson inherited a large deficit. Combined with a less-competitive economy, and a move away from using the pound as a reserve currency, the decision was taken in 1967 to reduce the exchange rate for the US dollar (which was at that time fixed) by 14% from $2.80 to $2.40 per pound. A statement was released on 18 November 1967 by Chancellor of the Exchequer James Callaghan explaining the reduction, as well as outlining a 2.5% rise in interest rates and cuts to the defence budget. The next day, Wilson made a televised broadcast to defend his decision, stating that:

From now on, the pound abroad is worth 14% or so less in terms of other currencies. That doesn't mean, of course, that the pound here in Britain, in your pocket or purse or in your bank, has been devalued.

Wilson was widely mocked for his statement, and met fierce opposition by parliamentarians, including members of his own cabinet, such as Callaghan (who resigned from his post soon after), and his deputy George Brown.

Conservative leader Edward Heath later gave a reply, accusing the government of failing to safeguard the nation's money.

=== 1970s ===
Heath subsequently won the 1970 general election, but by 1973 he was facing constant industrial action by coal miners over pay. This led to measures to ration electricity, including implementing a three-day week. He was unable to resolve the mineworkers' dispute, and announced his intent to call a general election in a televised broadcast on 7 February 1974, stating:

This time the strife has got to stop. Only you can stop it. It is time for you to speak, with your vote.

Heath encouraged the mineworkers to pause the strike for the three-week campaign period, but he was not able to persuade them and they continued the strike as planned. Harold Wilson was re-elected at the February election, and agreed a 'National Plan for Coal' to invest more in coalfields, stopping further industrial action. Former chancellor James Callaghan succeeded Wilson as prime minister in 1976, but lost the government's majority on his first day in office. Amid rising inflation and unemployment, Callaghan made a televised broadcast on 7 September 1978. It was widely expected that he would call an early general election, but in reality he chose to stay on for the full five-year term. He said that:

The government must and will continue to carry out policies that are consistent, determined, that don't chop or change and that brought about the present recovery in our fortunes.

His speech was strongly criticised by opposition leaders, with Liberal leader David Steel and Conservative leader Margaret Thatcher accusing Callaghan of "running scared".

Callaghan was eventually forced to call an election on 28 March 1979, after he lost a vote of no confidence in the House of Commons by a margin of one vote. This came after a series of strikes and economic unrest dubbed the Winter of Discontent, which severely damaged the government's popularity. The next day, he made a second statement defending the government's record, and officially announcing the general election. Opposition leader Margaret Thatcher made a response on 2 April (rescheduled from 31 March after the death of Airey Neave), ridiculing Callaghan's speech and encouraging the public to vote for her party at the election, which she went on to win.

=== 1980s ===
Margaret Thatcher did not give any further Ministerial Broadcasts in her time as prime minister, even in times of national crisis such as the Falklands War. In 1987 she was encouraged to give a broadcast about the spread of HIV/AIDS by Health Secretary Norman Fowler, but refused on the grounds of "bad taste".

=== 1990s ===
On 17 January 1991, John Major (who had succeeded Thatcher as Prime Minister the previous year) gave a broadcast about the decision to send British troops to fight in the Gulf War as part of Operation Desert Storm.

Major also gave a broadcast after signing the Downing Street Declaration on 15 December 1993, which affirmed the right of self-determination for the island of Ireland. In his statement, he said that Northern Ireland needed to:

Put the poison of history behind us. We cannot go on spilling blood in the name of the past. We must all have the courage to look to the future. The time to choose peace is long overdue. But only the men of violence can decide whether they will talk instead of bomb, discuss instead of murder.

== Recent broadcasts ==
=== Iraq War ===
There have been three ministerial broadcasts since the turn of the century. After Labour's landslide victory in the 1997 general election, Tony Blair became prime minister. Blair made his first and only televised broadcast at 10.00pm on 20 March 2003. In his address, he announced that British troops had been sent to fight in the Iraq War:

On Tuesday night I gave the order for British forces to take part in military action in Iraq.

Tonight British servicemen and women are engaged from air, land and sea.

Their mission: to remove Saddam Hussein from power and disarm Iraq of its weapons of mass destruction.

I know that this course of action has produced deep divisions of opinion in our country but I know also the British people will now be united in sending our armed forces our thoughts and prayers – they are the finest in the world and their families and all of Britain can have great pride in them.

=== COVID-19 pandemic ===
The next broadcast was made 17 years later by Boris Johnson, on 23 March 2020. (Note: Johnson's predecessors, Theresa May, David Cameron and Gordon Brown did not give any ministerial broadcasts during their periods in office.) In his speech, Johnson announced a nationwide lockdown due to the COVID-19 pandemic, with the public ordered to stay at home and only leave for essential purposes:

From this evening I must give the British people a very simple instruction – you must stay at home.

Because the critical thing we must do is stop the disease spreading between households...

...The people of this country will rise to that challenge.

And we will come through it stronger than ever.

We will beat the coronavirus and we will beat it together.

And therefore I urge you at this moment of national emergency to stay at home, protect our NHS and save lives.

His broadcast was shown at 8.30pm on BBC One, ITV, Channel 4, Channel 5, Sky News and the BBC News Channel, as well as on streaming service Amazon Prime, and attained overnight viewing figures of over 27 million, making one of the most watched programmes in the history of British television.

Johnson made a second broadcast on 10 May 2020 to announce the easing of lockdown measures in England, but this was met by a chorus of disapprovals from the leaders of Scotland, Northern Ireland and Wales.

== List of Prime Ministerial Broadcasts, Statements and Speeches ==
Prime Minister	Date	Subject
Andy Burnham	20 July 2026	On the goals of the premiership
Keir Starmer	20 July 2026	Farewell address
Keir Starmer	22 June 2026	Announcing the resignation of the premiership
Keir Starmer	28 Feb. 2026	On the US-Israel war with Iran
Keir Starmer	2 Oct. 2025	On the Manchester synagogue attack
Keir Starmer	5 August 2024	On the Southport riots
Keir Starmer	5 July 2024	On the goals of the premiership
Rishi Sunak	5 July 2024	Farewell address
Rishi Sunak	22 May 2024	Announcing a general election to be held on 4 July
Rishi Sunak	1 March 2024	On political and religious extremism
Rishi Sunak	25 Oct. 2022	On the goals of the premiership
Liz Truss	25 Oct. 2022	Farewell address
Liz Truss	20 Oct. 2022	Announcing the resignation of the premiership
Liz Truss	8 Sep. 2022	On the death of Queen Elizabeth II
Liz Truss	6 Sep. 2022	On the goals of the premiership
Boris Johnson	6 Sep. 2022	Farewell address
Boris Johnson	7 July 2022	Announcing the resignation of the premiership
Boris Johnson	24 Feb. 2022	On the Russian Invasion of Ukraine
Boris Johnson	12 Dec. 2021	On the coronavirus vaccination booster program
Boris Johnson	9 April 2021	On the death of HRH, Prince Philip Duke of Edinburgh
Boris Johnson	4 Jan. 2021	Announcing a national lockdown over a new coronavirus strain
Boris Johnson	22 Sep. 2020	Announcing a new coronavirus strategy for the upcoming winter season
Boris Johnson	10 May 2020	Announcing a national lockdown exit strategy for the coronavirus pandemic
Boris Johnson	27 April 2020	On returning from hospital following a coronavirus infection
Boris Johnson	23 March 2020	On the coronavirus pandemic
Boris Johnson	31 Jan. 2020	On the withdrawal of Britain from the European Union
Boris Johnson	13 Dec. 2019	On the results of the general election
Boris Johnson	6 Nov. 2019	Announcing a general election on 12 December
Boris Johnson	2 Sep. 2019	On the Suspension of Parliament
Boris Johnson	24 July 2019	On the goals of the premiership
Theresa May	24 July 2019	Farewell address
Theresa May	24 May 2019	Announcing the resignation of the Premiership
Theresa May	2 April 2019	Announcing an extension of the Brexit deadline
Theresa May	20 March 2019	On the Brexit negotiations
Theresa May	16 Jan. 2019	On the results of the vote of no confidence
Theresa May	12 Dec. 2018	On the results of the vote of no confidence
Theresa May	11 Dec. 2018	Announcing a vote of no confidence
Theresa May	14 Nov. 2018	Announcing a Brexit Deal
Theresa May	21 Sep. 2018	On the Brexit Negotiations (Chequers Agreement)
Theresa May	14 April 2018	Allied Airstrikes on Damascus and Homs
Theresa May	19 June 2017	On the Finsbury Park terrorist attack
Theresa May	9 June 2017	On the results of the general election
Theresa May	4 June 2017	On the London Bridge terrorist attack
Theresa May	24 May 2017	Announcing the raising of the UK terror threat level to critical
Theresa May	23 May 2017	On the Manchester Arena terrorist attack
Theresa May	18 April 2017	Announcing a general election to be held on 8 June
Theresa May	22 March 2017	On the Westminster terrorist attack
Theresa May	13 July 2016	On the goals of the premiership
David Cameron	13 July 2016	Farewell address
David Cameron	24 June 2016	Announcing the resignation of the premiership over the results of the Brexit referendum
David Cameron	20 Feb. 2016	Announcing a referendum on whether or no to leave the European Union
David Cameron	14 Nov. 2015	On the Paris attacks
David Cameron	13 Nov. 2015	On the killing of Jihadi John
David Cameron	8 May 2015	On the results of the general election
David Cameron	19 Sep. 2014	On the results of the Scottish independence referendum
David Cameron	6 Dec. 2013	On the death of Nelson Mandela
David Cameron	29 May 2013	On the murder of Lee Rigby
David Cameron	8 April 2013	On the death of Margaret Thatcher
David Cameron	22 August 2011	On the situation in Libya
David Cameron	9 August 2011	On the riots and general unrest
David Cameron	11 May 2010	On the goals of the premiership
Gordon Brown	11 May 2010	Announcing the resignation of the Premiership/Farewell address
Gordon Brown	7 May 2010	On the results of the general election
Gordon Brown	27 June 2007	On the goals of the premiership
Tony Blair	7 July 2005	On the London Underground bombings
Tony Blair	20 March 2003	On the war in Iraq
Tony Blair	7 Oct. 2001	Beginning of military operations in Afghanistan
Tony Blair	11 Sep. 2001	On the terrorist attacks in the United States
Tony Blair	26 March 1999	On the war in Kosovo
Tony Blair	16 Dec. 1998	Start of a US and British Bombing Campaign against Iraq
Tony Blair	2 May 1997	On the goals of the Premiership
John Major	2 May 1997	Farewell address
John Major	29 April 1997	On the eve of the general election
John Major	25 April 1997	On the upcoming general election
John Major	12 Feb. 1996	On the situation in Northern Ireland
John Major	17 Jan. 1991	On the war in the Gulf
Margaret Thatcher	8 June 1983	On the eve of the general election
James Callaghan	29 March 1979	Announcing a snap election
James Callaghan	7 Sep. 1978	On the Winter of Discontent
Harold Wilson	14 Oct. 1974	Announcing a snap election
Edward Heath	7 Feb. 1974	On the eve of the general election
Edward Heath	13 Dec. 1973	On the three-day week
Edward Heath	31 Dec. 1972	On the entering of the UK into the European Common Market (European Union)
Edward Heath	27 Feb. 1972	On Inflation and the Miners strike
Harold Wilson	19 Nov. 1967	On the devaluing of the UK Pound Sterling
Harold Wilson	14 Feb. 1967	On the war in Vietnam
Harold Wilson	6 Dec. 1966	On the situation in Rhodesia
Alec Douglas-Home	22 Nov. 1963	On the assassination of John Fitzgerald Kennedy
Alec Douglas-Home	19 Oct. 1963	On the goals of the premiership
Harold Macmillan	10 Jan. 1957	On the goals of the premiership
Anthony Eden	31 Oct. 1956	On the Suez Crisis
Anthony Eden	27 April 1956	On leaving for a trip to France
Winston Churchill	7 Feb. 1952	On the death of King George VI
Clement Attlee	28 July 1948	Observance of the Opening of the Games of the XIV Olympiad
Clement Attlee	4 July 1948	Announcing the establishment of the National Health Service
Clement Attlee	15 August 1945	On the surrender of Japan
Winston Churchill	13 May 1945	On the five year anniversary of becoming Prime Minister
Winston Churchill	8 May 1945	On the surrender of Germany
Winston Churchill	26 March 1944	Report on the war
Winston Churchill	31 August 1943	On the First Quebec Conference
Winston Churchill	14 May 1943	On the Home Guard
Winston Churchill	21 March 1943	On the state of the Union
Winston Churchill	29 Nov. 1942	On recent victories at Stalingrad and El Alemein
Winston Churchill	10 May 1942	On the Progress of the War
Winston Churchill	15 Feb. 1942	On the Fall of Singapore
Winston Churchill	8 Dec. 1941	On the Japanese declaration of war against the United States and Great Britain
Winston Churchill	24 August 1941	On meeting with United States President Franklin Delano Roosevelt (Atlantic Charter)
Winston Churchill	22 June 1941	On the German invasion of Russia
Winston Churchill	27 April 1941	Report on the war
Winston Churchill	9 Feb. 1941	On the Progress of the War
Winston Churchill	23 Dec. 1940	Message to the people of Italy
Winston Churchill	21 Oct. 1940	Message to the people of France
Winston Churchill	11 Sep. 1940	On the Blitz
Winston Churchill	14 July 1940	On the Battle of Britain
Winston Churchill	19 May 1940	On the Fall of France
Neville Chamberlain	10 May 1940	Announcing the resignation of the Premiership
Neville Chamberlain	26 Nov. 1939	On the Progress of the War
Neville Chamberlain	3 Sep. 1939	On the declaration of war against Germany
Neville Chamberlain	27 Sep. 1938	On the Munich Agreement

== Other Broadcasts ==
In addition to those listed above, other ministerial broadcasts were given by Cabinet ministers concerning matters such as civil defence and employment rights. Details of broadcasts are taken from the BBC's Genome Project.

Subject	Date	Minister	Ref
First Month of War	1 Oct. 1939	Winston Churchill, First Lord of the Admiralty	
First Twelve Weeks of War	12 Nov. 1939	Winston Churchill, First Lord of the Admiralty	
Sinking of the Graf Spee	18 Dec. 1939	Winston Churchill, First Lord of the Admiralty	
Formation of the Home Guard	14 May 1940	Anthony Eden, Secretary of State for War	
Meeting with Joseph Stalin	4 Jan. 1942	Anthony Eden, Foreign Secretary	
The Unquiet World	6 March 1958	Duncan Sandys, Minister of Defence	
Under Way	22 January 1959	Duncan Sandys, Minister of Defence	
Civil Defence in the Sixties	20 September 1961	Henry Brooke, Home Secretary	
Civil Defence 1962	19 September 1962	R. A. Butler, Home Secretary	
Civil Defence Today	16 September 1963	Henry Brooke, Home Secretary	
One Million Babies	2 June 1964	Anthony Barber, Minister of Health	
The Parliamentary Commissioner	6 April 1967	Richard Crossman, Leader of the House of Commons	
Resettlement of Indian Refugees from Uganda	31 August 1972	Alec Douglas-Home, Foreign and Commonwealth Secretary	
Implementation of the Equal Pay Act	29 December 1975	Michael Foot, Secretary of State for Employment	
The New Pension Scheme	30 March 1978	David Ennals, Secretary of State for Social Services	
Brexit Referendum	24 June 2016	Mark Carney, Governor of the Bank of England	
Reversal of the Mini-Budget	17 October 2022	Jeremy Hunt, Chancellor of the Exchequer	

== Budget Broadcasts ==
The chancellor of the exchequer gave a broadcast each year from 1953 to explain the budget, an economic plan that sets out the government's spending and taxation plans for the year. A representative of the main opposition party (usually the Shadow Chancellor of the Exchequer) would air a reply the next day, and from 1984 a spokesperson from the third-largest party in Parliament also made a response.

The broadcasts were scrapped by the BBC Trust in 2012, in favour of additional Party Political Broadcasts. The BBC defended its decision, saying that they originated from a time where filming the Budget Statement from inside the House of Commons was not possible, and the public would be able to access the information from various other outlets.

=== List of Budget Broadcasts ===
1950s
Budget	Date	Chancellor	Party	Date	Shadow Chancellor	Party	Ref
1953	16 April	R. A. Butler	Conservative	17 April	Hugh Gaitskell	Labour	
1954	8 April	R. A. Butler	Conservative	9 April	Hugh Gaitskell	Labour	
1955	21 April	R. A. Butler	Conservative	22 April	Hugh Gaitskell	Labour	
1956	18 April	Harold Macmillan	Conservative	19 April	Harold Wilson	Labour	
1957	9 April	Peter Thorneycroft	Conservative	10 April	Harold Wilson	Labour	
1958	15 April	Derick Heathcoat-Amory	Conservative	16 April	Harold Wilson	Labour	
1959	7 April	Derick Heathcoat-Amory	Conservative	8 April	Harold Wilson	Labour	

1960s
Budget	Date	Chancellor	Party	Date	Shadow Chancellor	Party	Ref
1960	4 April	Derick Heathcoat-Amory	Conservative	5 April	Harold Wilson	Labour	
1961	17 April	Selwyn Lloyd	Conservative	18 April	Harold Wilson	Labour	
1962	9 April	Selwyn Lloyd	Conservative	10 April	James Callaghan	Labour	
1963	3 April	Reginald Maudling	Conservative	4 April	James Callaghan	Labour	
1964	14 April	Reginald Maudling	Conservative	15 April	James Callaghan	Labour	
1965	6 April	James Callaghan	Labour	7 April	Edward Heath	Conservative	
1966	3 May	James Callaghan	Labour	4 May	Ian Macleod	Conservative	
1967	11 April	James Callaghan	Labour	12 April	Ian Macleod	Conservative	
1968	19 March	Roy Jenkins	Labour	20 March	Ian Macleod	Conservative	
1969	15 April	Roy Jenkins	Labour	16 April	Ian Macleod	Conservative	

1970s
Budget	Date	Chancellor	Party	Date	Shadow Chancellor	Party	Ref
1970	14 April	Roy Jenkins	Labour	15 April	Ian Macleod	Conservative	
1971	30 March	Anthony Barber	Conservative	31 March	Roy Jenkins	Labour	
1972	21 March	Anthony Barber	Conservative	22 March	Roy Jenkins	Labour	
1973	6 March	Anthony Barber	Conservative	7 March	Denis Healey	Labour	
Mar 1974	26 March	Denis Healey	Labour	27 March	Robert Carr	Conservative	
Nov 1974	12 November	Denis Healey	Labour	13 November	Robert Carr	Conservative	
1975	15 April	Denis Healey	Labour	16 April	Geoffrey Howe	Conservative	
1976	6 April	Denis Healey	Labour	7 April	Geoffrey Howe	Conservative	
1977	29 March	Denis Healey	Labour	30 March	Geoffrey Howe	Conservative	
1978	11 April	Denis Healey	Labour	12 April	Geoffrey Howe	Conservative	
Apr 1979	3 April	Denis Healey	Labour	4 April	Geoffrey Howe	Conservative	
Jun 1979	12 June	Geoffrey Howe	Conservative	13 June	Denis Healey	Labour	

1980s
Budget	Date	Chancellor	Party	Date	Shadow Chancellor	Party	Ref			
1980	26 March	Geoffrey Howe	Conservative	27 March	Denis Healey	Labour				
1981	10 March	Geoffrey Howe	Conservative	11 March	Peter Shore	Labour				
1982	9 March	Geoffrey Howe	Conservative	10 March	Peter Shore	Labour				
1983	15 March	Geoffrey Howe	Conservative	16 March	Peter Shore	Labour				
Budget	Date	Chancellor	Party	Date	Shadow Chancellor	Party	Date	Spokesperson	Party	Ref
1984	13 March	Nigel Lawson	Conservative	14 March	Roy Hattersley	Labour	15 March	Roy Jenkins	SDP-Liberal Alliance	
1985	19 March	Nigel Lawson	Conservative	20 March	Roy Hattersley	Labour	21 March	David Steel	SDP-Liberal Alliance	
1986	18 March	Nigel Lawson	Conservative	19 March	Roy Hattersley	Labour	20 March	Roy Jenkins	SDP-Liberal Alliance	
1987	17 March	Nigel Lawson	Conservative	18 March	Roy Hattersley	Labour	19 March	Roy Jenkins	SDP-Liberal Alliance	
1988	15 March	Nigel Lawson	Conservative	16 March	John Smith	Labour	17 March	Alan Beith	SDP-Liberal Alliance	
1989	14 March	Nigel Lawson	Conservative	15 March	John Smith	Labour	16 March	Alan Beith	Social and Liberal Democrats	

1990s
Budget	Date	Chancellor	Party	Date	Shadow Chancellor	Party	Date	Spokesperson	Party	Ref
1990	20 March	John Major	Conservative	21 March	John Smith	Labour	22 March	Alan Beith	Liberal Democrats	
1991	19 March	Norman Lamont	Conservative	20 March	John Smith	Labour	21 March	Alan Beith	Liberal Democrats	
1992	10 March	Norman Lamont	Conservative	11 March	John Smith	Labour	12 March	Alan Beith	Liberal Democrats	
Mar 1993	16 March	Norman Lamont	Conservative	17 March	Gordon Brown	Labour	18 March	Alan Beith	Liberal Democrats	
Nov 1993	30 November	Kenneth Clarke	Conservative	1 December	Gordon Brown	Labour	2 December	Alan Beith	Liberal Democrats	
1994	29 November	Kenneth Clarke	Conservative	30 November	Gordon Brown	Labour	1 December	Malcolm Bruce	Liberal Democrats	
1995	28 November	Kenneth Clarke	Conservative	29 November	Gordon Brown	Labour	30 November	Malcolm Bruce	Liberal Democrats	
1996	26 November	Kenneth Clarke	Conservative	27 November	Gordon Brown	Labour	28 November	Malcolm Bruce	Liberal Democrats	
1997	2 July	Gordon Brown	Labour	3 July	Michael Heseltine	Conservative	4 July	Malcolm Bruce	Liberal Democrats	
1998	17 March	Gordon Brown	Labour	18 March	Peter Lilley	Conservative	19 March	Malcolm Bruce	Liberal Democrats	
1999	9 March	Gordon Brown	Labour	10 March	Francis Maude	Conservative	11 March	Malcolm Bruce	Liberal Democrats	

2000s
Budget	Date	Chancellor	Party	Date	Shadow Chancellor	Party	Date	Spokesperson	Party	Ref
2000	21 March	Gordon Brown	Labour	22 March	Michael Portillo	Conservative	23 March	Matthew Taylor	Liberal Democrats	
2001	7 March	Gordon Brown	Labour	8 March	Michael Portillo	Conservative	9 March	Matthew Taylor	Liberal Democrats	
2002	17 April	Gordon Brown	Labour	18 April	Michael Howard	Conservative	19 April	Matthew Taylor	Liberal Democrats	
2003	9 April	Gordon Brown	Labour	10 April	Michael Howard	Conservative	11 April	Matthew Taylor	Liberal Democrats	
2004	17 March	Gordon Brown	Labour	18 March	Oliver Letwin	Conservative	19 March	Vince Cable	Liberal Democrats	
2005	16 March	Gordon Brown	Labour	17 March	Oliver Letwin	Conservative	18 March	Vince Cable	Liberal Democrats	
2006	22 March	Gordon Brown	Labour	23 March	George Osborne	Conservative	24 March	Vince Cable	Liberal Democrats	
2007	21 March	Gordon Brown	Labour	22 March	George Osborne	Conservative	23 March	Vince Cable	Liberal Democrats	
2008	12 March	Alistair Darling	Labour	13 March	George Osborne	Conservative	14 March	Vince Cable	Liberal Democrats	
2009	22 April	Alistair Darling	Labour	23 April	George Osborne	Conservative	24 April	Vince Cable	Liberal Democrats	

2010s
Budget	Date	Chancellor	Party	Date	Shadow Chancellor	Party	Date	Spokesperson	Party	Ref
March 2010	24 March	Alistair Darling	Labour	25 March	George Osborne	Conservative	26 March	Vince Cable	Liberal Democrats	
June 2010	22 June	George Osborne	Conservative	23 June	Alistair Darling	Labour	The Liberal Democrats served in the coalition government, and did not broadcast a response to the budget during their time in office.			
2011	23 March	George Osborne	Conservative	23 March	Ed Balls	Labour	The Liberal Democrats served in the coalition government, and did not broadcast a response to the budget during their time in office.			

== In popular culture ==
An episode of the BBC satirical comedy Yes, Prime Minister ("The Ministerial Broadcast") features the main character Jim Hacker preparing for his first ministerial broadcast as prime minister.

== See also ==
- Royal address to the nation, a similar broadcast by the King.
- Oval Office address, a broadcast by the President of the United States
- Cadena nacional
