= Budget of the United Kingdom =

Balance sheet of the British government

United Kingdom budget
- Country: United Kingdom
- Website: www.gov.uk

The Budget of His Majesty's Government is an annual budget set by HM Treasury for the following financial year, with the revenues to be gathered by HM Revenue and Customs and the expenditures of the public sector, in compliance with government policy. The budget statement is one of two statements made by the Chancellor of the Exchequer in the House of Commons, with the Spring Statement being made the following year.

Budgets are usually set once every year and are announced in the House of Commons by the Chancellor of the Exchequer. Since Autumn 2017 the United Kingdom budget typically takes place in the Autumn in order to allow major tax changes to occur annually, well before the start of the fiscal year. The most recent budget was presented by John Healey on 28 October 2026.

== Overview ==
UK central government expenditure projection for tax year 2009–2010, according to the 2009 Pre-Budget Report

The UK fiscal year ends on 5 April each year. The financial year ends on 31 March of each year. Thus, the UK budget for financial year 2021 runs from 1 April 2021 to 31 March 2022 and is often referred to as 2021–22.

Historically, the budget was usually released in March, less than one month before the beginning of the new fiscal year. Parliament was not expected to take action on a budget for the fiscal year until the summer, several months after the start of the fiscal year. For that reason, Parliament typically passed a "Vote on Account" in early spring that provided continuity of funding into the new fiscal year, up until the point that the new budget was enacted. The spending authorized in the Vote on Account was normally 45% of the amounts already authorized in the current fiscal year, taking into account the Main Estimates and any revised or Supplementary Estimates already approved by Parliament. Legislative action on the proposed budget generally aligned with the executive's original budget request; failure to carry the budget would be regarded as tantamount to a vote of no confidence.

Since November 2017 the budget was moved to the Autumn, with a view to passing the Finance Act before the commencement of the Financial Year. Votes on Account should no longer be necessary.

Governmental departments submit their funding requests — called "Main Supply Estimates" – to HM Treasury. The government then releases this data in a large consolidated document titled "Central Government Supply Estimates (Budget Year-Following Year): Main Supply Estimates".

The government reserves the right to submit "Supplementary Estimates" in the spring and winter of a given fiscal year to update its agencies' spending totals for the current financial year and report any governmental re-organizations. When an agency submits a Supplementary Estimate, it is customary to also submit an "Estimate Memorandum" to the agency's relevant oversight committee in Parliament describing and justifying the changes. This condenses two functions – reporting supplemental spending requests and agency re-organizations.

== List of budgets ==
Budget	Revenue	Expenditure	Deficit/(Surplus)	Budget Report
2026				
2025	£1.304 trillion	£1.416 trillion	£112 billion	
2024, October	£1.229 trillion	£1.335 trillion	£106 billion	
2024, March	£1.139 trillion	£1.226 trillion	£87 billion	
2023	£1.057 trillion	£1.189 trillion	£132 billion	
2021, October	£962 billion	£1.045 trillion	£83 billion	
2021, March	£819 billion	£1.053 trillion	£234 billion	
2020	£873 billion	£928 billion	£55 billion	
2018	£810 billion	£842 billion	£32 billion	
2017, November	£769 billion	£809 billion	£40 billion	
2017, March	£744 billion	£802 billion	£58 billion	
2016	£716 billion	£772 billion	£56 billion	
2015, July	£673 billion	£742 billion	£62 billion	
2015, March	£667 billion	£742 billion	£75 billion	
2014	£648 billion	£732 billion	£84 billion	
2013	£612 billion	£720 billion	£108 billion	
2012	£592 billion	£683 billion	£91 billion	
2011	£589 billion	£710 billion	£121 billion	
2010, June	£548 billion	£697 billion	£149 billion	
2010, March	£541 billion	£704 billion	£163 billion	
2009	£496 billion	£671 billion	£175 billion	
2008	£575 billion	£618 billion	£43 billion	
2007	£553 billion	£587 billion	£34 billion	
2006	£516 billion	£552 billion	£36 billion	
2005	£487 billion	£519 billion	£32 billion	
2004	£451 billion	£485 billion	£34 billion	
2003	£423 billion	£460 billion	£37 billion	
2002	£407 billion	£418 billion	£11 billion	
2001	£398 billion	£394 billion	(£4 billion)	
2000	£371 billion	£371 billion	£0 billion	
1999	£349 billion	£349 billion	£0 billion	
1998	£330.1 billion	£332.5 billion	£2.4 billion	

== Differences between the UK and other main economies ==
Differences between the UK and United States:

1. The period of fiscal year. The UK fiscal year ends on 5 April each year, while in the United States it begins on 1 October and ends on 30 September the following year.
2. The person that the budget document begins with. In the UK, Budgets are usually set once every year and are announced in the House of Commons by the Chancellor of the Exchequer. But, in the United States, it often begins with the President's proposal to Congress recommending funding levels for the next fiscal year.

Differences between the UK and the European Union:

1. The entity that proposes the budget. In the EU, the budget is proposed annually by the European Commission, and reviewed and negotiated by the Council of the European Union (which represents Member States' governments) and the European Parliament (which represents EU citizens).
2. In the EU, the annual budget must remain within ceilings determined in advance by the Multiannual Financial Framework, laid down for a (five to) seven-year period.

== See also ==
- Countries of the United Kingdom by GVA per capita
- United Kingdom national debt
- Budget Day
- Economy of the United Kingdom
- Departments of the Government of the United Kingdom
- Government spending in the United Kingdom
- Whole of Government Accounts
