= Chancellorship of Gordon Brown =

Gordon Brown's tenure at HM Treasury (1997–2007)

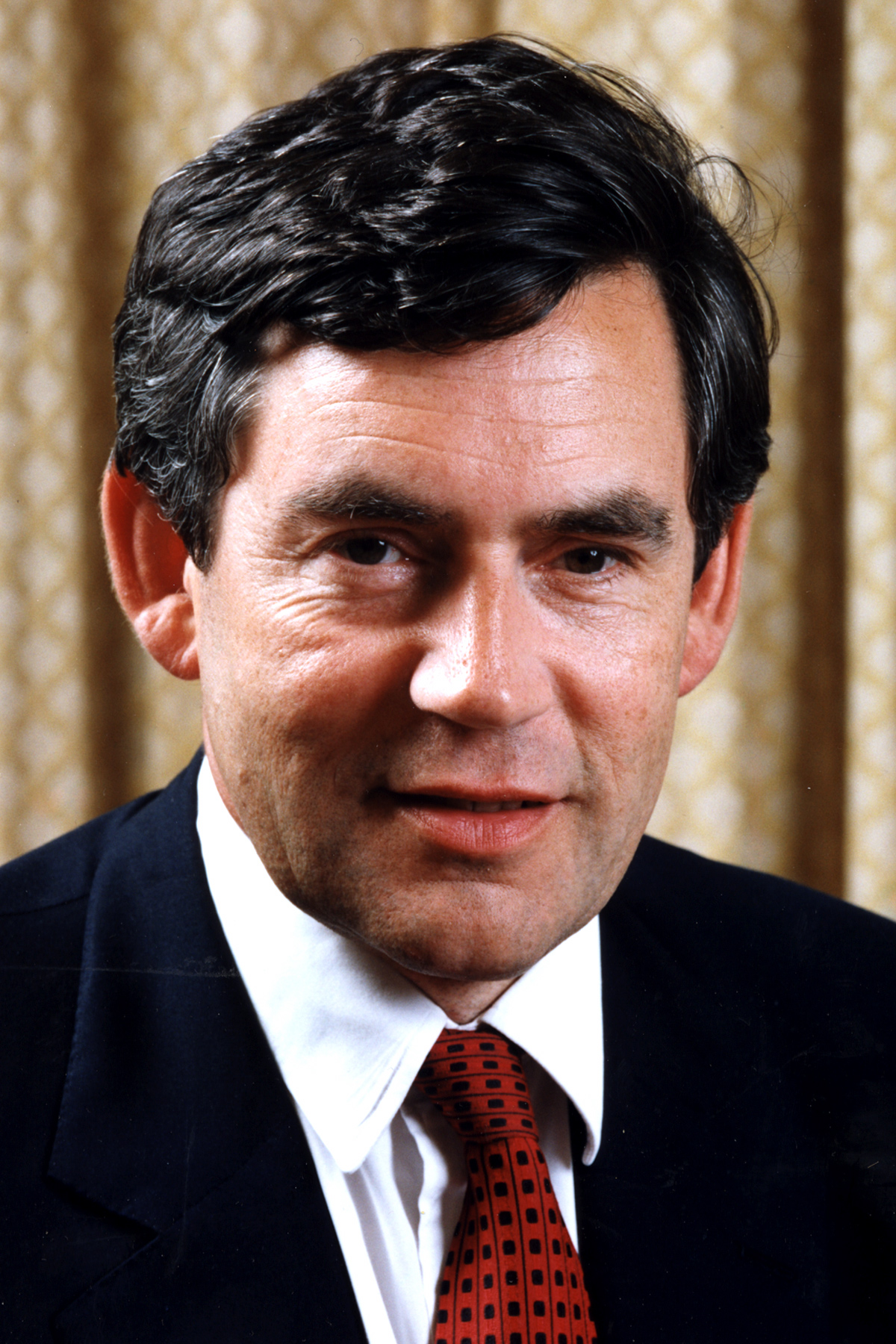
- Official portrait, c. 1997–1999
- Chancellorship of Gordon Brown; 2 May 1997 – 28 June 2007
- Chancellor: Gordon Brown
- Party: Labour
- Election: 1997, 2001, 2005
- Nominated by: Tony Blair
- Appointed by: Elizabeth II
- Seat: 11 Downing Street
- Coat of arms of HM Government

Gordon Brown served as Chancellor of the Exchequer of the United Kingdom from 2 May 1997 to 28 June 2007. His tenure was marked by major reform of Britain's monetary and fiscal policy architecture, transferring interest rate setting powers to the Bank of England, by a wide extension of the powers of the Treasury to cover much domestic policy and by transferring responsibility for banking supervision to the Financial Services Authority. Brown presided over the longest period of sustained economic growth in British history.

Brown was appointed chancellor by Prime Minister Tony Blair following Labour's victory in the 1997 general election, its largest landslide general election victory in history, and served in the role throughout Blair's premiership. One of Brown's first acts as chancellor was to grant the Bank of England the freedom to set the UK's interest rate, a decision that had previously been the responsibility of the chancellor. Brown was reappointed chancellor following Labour's landslide victory in the 2001 general election, and won a third term after the party also won the 2005 general election, though with a vastly reduced majority. During his chancellorship, Brown outlined five economic tests, which resisted the UK adopting the euro currency. Controversial moves included the abolition of advance corporation tax (ACT) relief in his first budget, the sale of UK gold reserves from 1999 to 2002, and the removal in his final budget of the 10% starting rate of income tax which he had introduced in the 1999 budget.

Brown's tenure as chancellor set several records. He was the longest-serving Labour Party chancellor ever, beating Denis Healey, who was chancellor for 5 years and 2 months from 5 March 1974 to 4 May 1979. In June 2004, he became the longest continuous serving Chancellor since the Reform Act 1832, passing the figure of 7 years and 43 days set by David Lloyd George (1908–1915). However, William Ewart Gladstone was chancellor for a total of 12 years and 4 months in the period from 1852 to 1882 (although not continuously). Brown stated his chancellorship had seen the longest period of sustained economic growth in UK history, although part of this growth period started under the preceding Conservative government under John Major in 1993, and the details in Brown's growth figures have been challenged, as have his more general claims to have created the conditions for prosperity and declining poverty levels.

== Major acts as Chancellor ==
Following Labour's victory in the 1997 general election, its largest landslide general election victory in history, Prime Minister Tony Blair appointed Gordon Brown as Chancellor of the Exchequer. He had previously served as Shadow Chancellor of the Exchequer in Tony Blair's Shadow Cabinet from 1994 to 1997. As Shadow Chancellor, Brown as Chancellor-in-waiting was seen as a good choice by business and the middle class.

It has long been rumoured a deal was struck between Blair and Brown at the former Granita restaurant in Islington, in which Blair promised to give Brown control of economic policy in return for Brown not standing against him in the 1994 Labour leadership election. Whether this is true or not, the relationship between Blair and Brown was central to the fortunes of New Labour, and they mostly remained united in public, despite reported serious private rifts.

=== Bank of England ===
On taking office as Chancellor, Brown gave the Bank of England operational independence in monetary policy, and thus responsibility for setting interest rates. At the same time, he stripped the Bank of England of its regulatory powers, giving them to the newly created Financial Services Authority, whose board is appointed by the Treasury.

=== Taxation and spending ===
Brown adhered to Labour's 1997 election manifesto pledge not to increase the basic or higher rates of income tax. He reduced the starting rate from 20% (pre-1997) to 10% in 1999, before abolishing the starting rate in 2007; a decision that led to an immense backbench revolt, and reduced the basic rate from 23% (pre-1997) to 22% (2000) and then 20% (2007).

Brown increased the tax thresholds in line with inflation, rather than earnings, which rise more quickly during periods of economic growth. This results in fiscal drag in which more taxpayers are drawn into the upper rates (e.g. in 2000–01 there were 2,880,000 higher-rate taxpayers, whereas in 2005–06 there were 3,160,000).

In 1997, Brown also introduced taxation of pension funds. Documents subsequently released under the Freedom of Information Act showed that civil servants warned at the time that the move, which generated £5,000,000,000 in tax revenue, could lead to the closure of many occupational schemes, which subsequently came to pass. In 2008, a biographer of Brown, Tom Bower, claimed that Brown had originally sought a larger sum from pension funds, but backed down in the face of opposition.

In contrast, corporation tax fell under Brown, from a main rate of 33% (pre-1997) to 30% (1999) and then 28% (2007), and from 24% to 19% for small businesses (although the lower rate was set to rise to 22% by 2010).

Under Brown, telecom radio frequency auctions gathered £22,500,000,000 for the government. By using a system of sealed bids and only selling a restricted number of licences, they extracted high prices from the telecom operators. Germany at this time applied a similar auction; some allege that these together caused a severe recession in the European telecoms development industry (2001 Telecoms crash) with the loss of 100,000 jobs across Europe, 30,000 of those in the UK. But, as Paul Klemperer, one of the designers of the auctions, points out, "[t]he United States held no 3G auctions, yet telecoms companies lost just as much: in fact, they lost more."

Once the two-year period of following the Conservative's spending plans was over, Brown's 2000 Spending Review outlined a major expansion of government spending, particularly on healthcare and education. In his April 2002 budget, Brown raised National Insurance to pay for increased health spending. Brown also changed tax policy in other ways, such as the introduction of Working Tax Credits. This is one of several ideas borrowed from the US Clinton administration whereby welfare payments are accounted for as negative taxation. The separate means-testing process for tax credits has been criticised by some as bureaucratic, and in 2003–04 and 2004–05 problems in the system led to overpayments of £2,200,000,000 and £1,800,000,000 respectively. However, economic theory suggests tax credits can strengthen work incentives for those at the margin between employment and unemployment, and the IFS has estimated the reforms brought at least 50,000 single mothers into part-time work.

The Centre for Policy Studies found the poorest fifth of households, which accounted for 6.8% of all taxes in 1996–7, accounted for 6.9% of all taxes paid in 2004–5. Meanwhile, their share of state benefit payouts dropped from 28.1% to 27.1% over the same period.

According to the OECD UK taxation had increased from a 39.3% share of GDP in 1997 to 42.4% in 2006, going to a higher level than Germany. This increase has mainly been attributed to active government policy, and not simply to the growing economy. To have brought this about with only one explicit tax rise has led to accusations of Brown imposing stealth taxes. A commonly reported example resulted in 1997 from a technical change in the way corporation tax is collected, the indirect effect of which was for the dividends on equity investments held within pensions to be taxed, thus lowering pension returns and allegedly contributing to the demise of some pension funds. The Treasury contend that this tax change was crucial to long-term economic growth: the existing corporation tax system created biased incentives for corporations to pay out profits as dividends to shareholders (including pension funds, who could then reclaim the tax paid) rather than to reinvest them into company growth (which would result in corporation tax being paid). The old system of corporation tax was widely viewed by economists as a constraint on British economic growth.

=== Growth development and employment ===
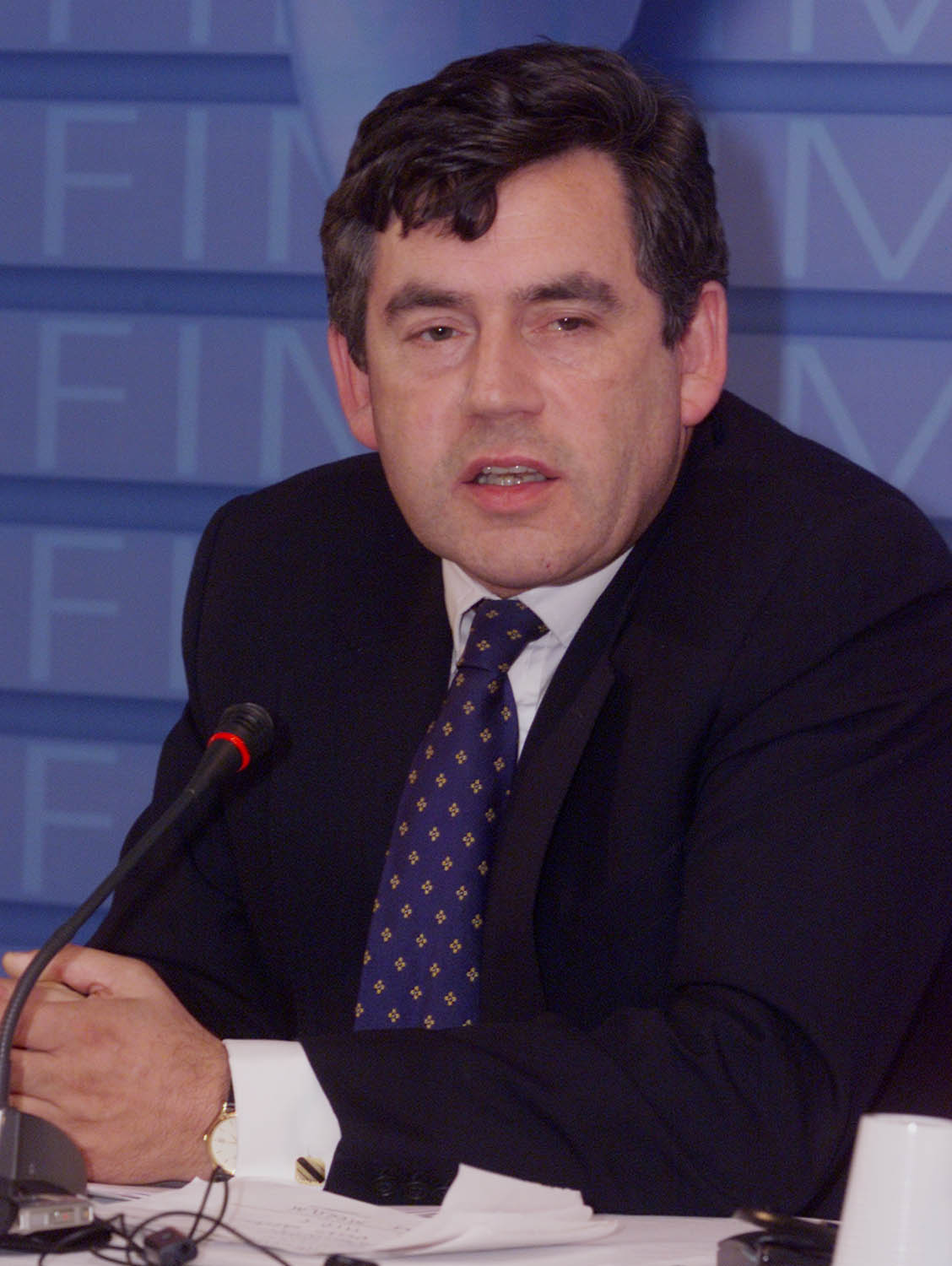
Gordon Brown at a press conference in 2000

Brown pointed to two main accomplishments: growth and employment. An OECD report shows UK economic growth averaged 2.7% between 1997 and 2006, higher than the Eurozone's 2.1%, though lower than in any other English-speaking country. UK unemployment is 5.5%, down from 7% in 1997 and lower than the Eurozone's average of 8.1%.

In October 1997, Brown took control of the United Kingdom's membership of the European single currency issue by announcing the Treasury would set five economic tests to ascertain whether the economic case had been made. In June 2003, the Treasury indicated the tests had not been passed.

Between 1999 and 2002, Brown sold 60% of UK gold reserves at $275 an ounce. It was later attacked as a "disastrous foray into international asset management" as he had sold at close to a 20-year low. The UK eventually sold about 395 tons of gold over 17 auctions from July 1999 to March 2002, at an average price of about US$275 per ounce, raising approximately US$3,500,000,000. By 2011, that quantity of gold would be worth over $19,000,000,000. He pressured the IMF to do the same, but it resisted.

Brown believes it is appropriate to remove much of the unpayable Third World debt but does not think all debt should be wiped out.

When Labour was re-elected for a third consecutive term at the 2005 general election (though with a vastly reduced majority following the landslide victories at the previous two elections), many MPs spoke of the Labour election victory as being Brown's achievement rather than Blair's; while Blair was facing criticism as prime minister for leading the UK into Afghanistan and Iraq, Brown was receiving credit for helping secure a strong economy for Britain.

On 20 April 2006, in a speech to the United Nations Ambassadors, Brown outlined a "Green" view of global development:

… far from being at odds with each other, our economic objectives and our environmental objectives now increasingly reinforce each other. … Environmental sustainability is not an option – it is a necessity. For economies to flourish, for global poverty to be banished, for the well-being of the world's people to be enhanced – not just in this generation but in succeeding generations – we have a compelling and ever more urgent duty of stewardship to take care of the natural environment and resources on which our economic activity and social fabric depends. … A new paradigm that sees economic growth, social justice and environmental care advancing together can become the common sense of our age.

== Other statements and events ==
=== Higher education ===
In 2000, Brown started a major political row about higher education (referred to as the Laura Spence affair) when he accused the University of Oxford of elitism in its admissions procedures. He described the university's decision not to offer a place to state school pupil Laura Spence as "absolutely outrageous" and implied its decision was based on her background rather than her academic potential. This started a major and hotly argued row in the media in which Oxford strongly denied these accusations. With his comments, Brown can arguably be credited with raising widening participation to higher education up the political agenda. However, many of his opponents said Brown's comments were ill-founded; including Lord Jenkins (then Chancellor of the University of Oxford) who said "nearly every fact he used was false," and that Brown's speech had been a "little Blitzkrieg in being an act of sudden unprovoked aggression".

=== Anti-racism and popular culture ===
During a diplomatic visit to India in January 2007, Brown responded to questions concerning perceived racism and bullying against Bollywood actress Shilpa Shetty on the UK reality TV programme Celebrity Big Brother saying, "There is a lot of support for Shilpa. It is pretty clear we are getting the message across. Britain is a nation of tolerance and fairness." He later said the debate showed Britain wanted to be "defined by being a tolerant, fair and decent country."

== Budgets ==
Brown delivered eleven budgets during his chancellorship; 1997, 1998, 1999, 2000, 2001, 2002, 2003, 2004, 2005, 2006, and 2007.

=== 1997 ===
In his budget speech, which he described as a "people's budget", Brown told the House of Commons the government was spending more on debt than education, and set a five-year target to reduce the public deficit, while also announcing that the government would only borrow to invest and public debt would be held at a "prudent and stable level over the economic cycle". He set the underlying public sector borrowing requirement at £13.25bn for 1997–98, and £5.5bn for 1998–99. It was forecast that GDP would rise by 3.25% in 1997 and 2.5% in 1998, and consumer spending would increase by 4.5% in 1997 and 4% in 1998. Economic growth was forecast to be 2.5% for 1998, while inflation would rise by 2.5% in 1997, 2.75% in 1998, and 2.5% in 1999.

=== 1998 ===
Titled New Ambitions for Britain, and with "prudence as a purpose" as its narrative, Brown's 1998 budget sought to strike a careful balance between maintaining Labour's broad appeal among the Middle England demographic who had voted for the party the previous year, thus helping Tony Blair to become prime minister, while offering help to those on low incomes. His statement set out to achieve four objectives—stability, enterprise, welfare reform and strong public services. He told the House of Commons: "For decades, under Governments of both parties, the great economic strengths of our country have been undermined by deep-seated structural weaknesses—instability, under-investment, unemployment." He hoped to address this with a long-term plan for economic growth and success.

He reported that the five-year plan to reduce the UK's deficit announced in his 1997 budget was being achieved at a faster rate than had been forecast, with the UK national debt having come down by £17bn, (Note: about £27bn at 2021 prices) or 2% of national income, since July 1997. He expressed a need for caution, and said that he would "lock in this fiscal tightening" for 1998–99. As a consequence, borrowing, which the previous government had planned to be £19bn (Note: about £30bn at 2021 prices) for 1998, was now forecast to be £5bn (Note: about £8bn at 2021 prices) for 1998, a little under £4bn (Note: about £6bn at 2021 prices) for 1999, and was expected to be in balance by 2000. On economic growth, Brown said it was dependent on "what happens to wage inflation over the coming year. It would be the worst of short-termism to pay ourselves more today at the cost of higher interest rates, fewer jobs and slower growth tomorrow. All of us must therefore show greater responsibility." He suggested wage inflation would slow growth from 2.5% to 2% in 1998, and similarly predicted percentage figures of between one and three quarters and two and a quarter for 1999, and between two and a quarter and two and three quarters for 2000."

=== 1999 ===
The budget took place during a period of continuing economic expansion, shortly after the launch of the Euro currency on 1 January 1999, and at the tail end of the dot-com bubble. During 1998, net public sector debt stood at £361.2 billion, 35.6% of GDP. Interest rates had declined rapidly over the previous twelve months from a peak of 7.5% in June 1998 to 5.5% by February 1999, whilst inflation during 1998 was recorded at 1.6% (CPI) and 3.4% (RPI).

A new starting rate of income tax at 10% was to be introduced in April 1999. Basic rate income tax was to be reduced from 23% to 22% in April 2000. The budget also abolished the married couple's allowance for under-65s and MIRAS mortgage interest relief from April 2000. Child tax credit was to be introduced and employer national insurance contributions cut by 0.5% from April 2001. Stamp duties on property were to be raised. A Climate Change Levy was scheduled for the 2001–02 fiscal year.

=== 2000 ===
The millennium year witnessed Britain's major trading partners, particularly the US and several European economies, enter economic difficulties as part of the early 2000s recession. The dot-com bubble burst, though fallout in the United Kingdom was limited. During the autumn, rising petrol prices drove UK fuel protests. During 1999, net public sector debt stood at £364.4 billion, 34.3% of GDP. Interest rates showed greater stability in comparison to the previous year, rising from 5% in June 1999 to 6% in February 2000, where it remained for the rest of the year. Inflation abated further during 1999 which recorded 1.3% (CPI) and 1.5% (RPI).

The basic rate of income tax was to be reduced from 23% to 22% from April 2000. The married couple's allowance for under-65s and MIRAS mortgage interest relief was to be abolished from April 2000. Fuel duty was to be frozen in real terms. Excise duties on cigarettes were to increase by 5% above inflation. Stamp duties were to be raised. Tax credits and income support were scheduled to be increased. Large increases in NHS spending were forecast. The Climate Change Levy was to be reduced before its introduction in April 2001, with the concomitant cut in employer national insurance contributions instead limited to 0.3% instead of 0.5%.

=== 2002 ===
The most significant policy implemented as part of this Budget was the 1% National Insurance increase on both employees and employers, the proceeds of which went towards an increase in NHS spending.

== See also ==
- Premiership of Tony Blair
- Chancellorship of Rishi Sunak
