= First Major ministry =

Government of the United Kingdom from 1990 to 1992

- Cabinet of the United Kingdom
- 1990–1992
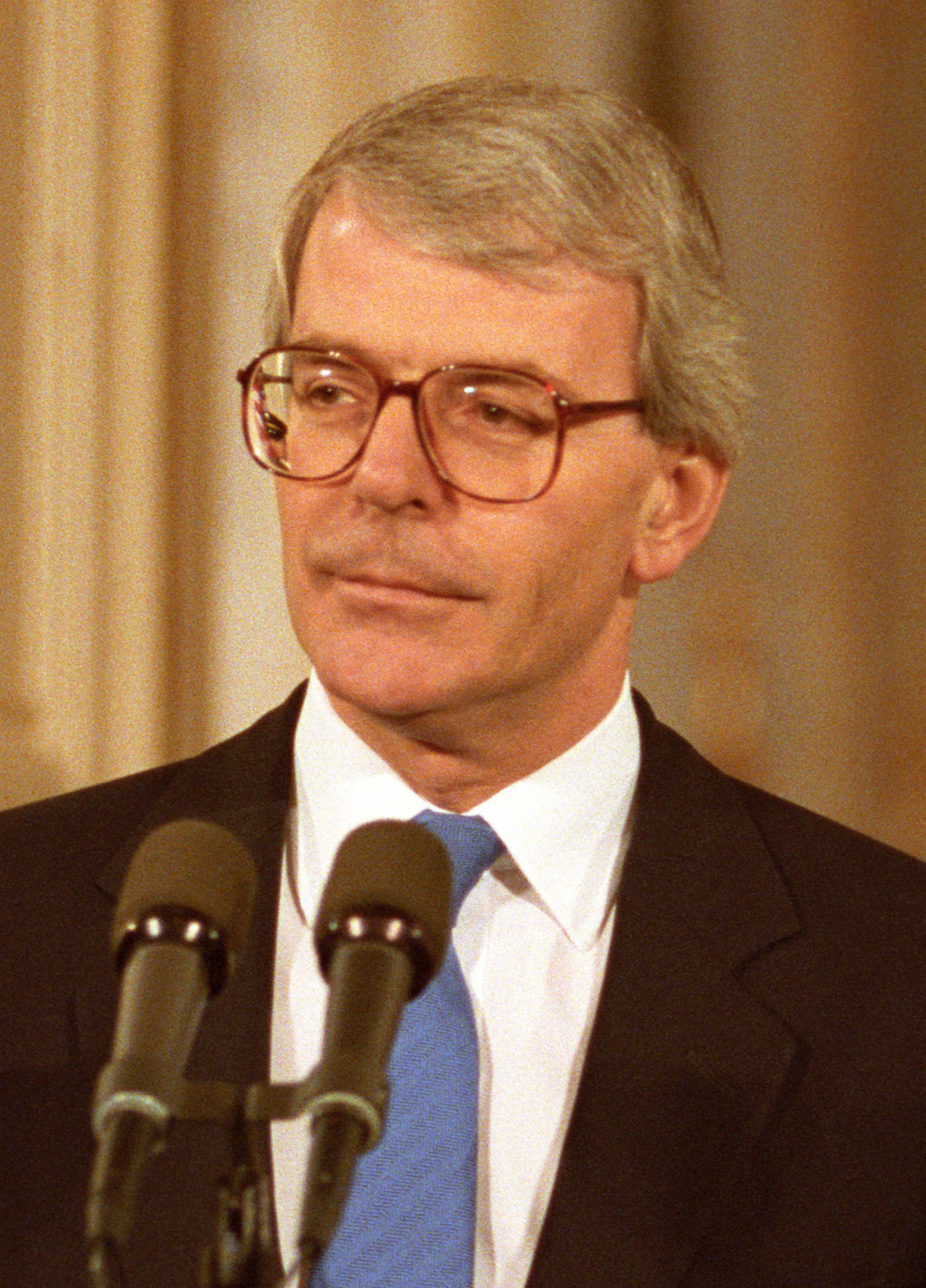
- Major in 1993
- Date formed: 28 November 1990
- Date dissolved: 10 April 1992

People and organisations
- Monarch: Elizabeth II
- Prime Minister: John Major
- Prime Minister's history: Premiership of John Major
- Total no. of members: 108 appointments
- Member party: Conservative Party
- Status in legislature: Majority
- Opposition cabinet: Kinnock shadow cabinet
- Opposition party: Labour Party
- Opposition leader: Neil Kinnock

History
- Incoming formation: 1990 Conservative leadership election
- Outgoing election: 1992 general election
- Legislature terms: 50th UK Parliament
- Budgets: 1991 budget; 1992 budget
- Predecessor: Third Thatcher ministry
- Successor: Second Major ministry

John Major formed the first Major ministry upon the resignation of Margaret Thatcher in November 1990, after being invited by Queen Elizabeth II to form a new government. Major inherited a majority government.

== Formation ==
The resignation of Margaret Thatcher as prime minister came on 22 November 1990, more than 11 years after she had first been elected. Former Cabinet minister Michael Heseltine had challenged her leadership earlier in November and although she fared better than him in the leadership contest, she was unable to gain an outright win and handed in her resignation, paving the way for a new Conservative leader more likely to win the next general election which was due within 18 months.

The announcement of the Community Charge (often referred to as the Poll Tax) during 1989 and the onset of a recession shortly before Thatcher's resignation had seen Tory support plunge in the opinion polls, most of which were showing a double-digit Labour lead and making it seem likely that Neil Kinnock would be the next prime minister.

Conservative MPs elected Chancellor of the Exchequer, John Major as their new leader on 27 November 1990, and he was invited by the Queen to form a majority government the following day.

== Fate ==
The change of leader from Margaret Thatcher to John Major saw a revival in Tory support, with the double-digit lead in the opinion polls for the Labour Party being replaced by a narrow Conservative one by the turn of 1991. Although a general election did not have to be held until June 1992, Labour leader Neil Kinnock kept pressurising Major to hold an election during 1991, but Major resisted the calls and there was no election that year.

The recession which began in the autumn of 1990 deepened during 1991, with unemployment standing at nearly 2.5 million by December 1991, compared to 1.6 million just 18 months earlier. Despite this, Tory support in the opinion polls remained relatively strong, with any Labour lead now being by the narrowest of margins, although Labour still made some gains at the expense of the Tories in local elections, and seized the Monmouth seat from the Tories in a by-election.

Major finally called an election for 9 April 1992 which ended the first Major ministry. In a surprise to most pollsters, Major won the election, which led to the formation of the Second Major ministry and a fourth consecutive Conservative term in office.

== Cabinet ==
=== November 1990 – April 1992 ===
First Major Cabinet
Portfolio	Minister	Term
Cabinet ministers
Prime Minister; First Lord of the Treasury; Minister for the Civil Service	John Major	1990–97
Lord High Chancellor of Great Britain	James Mackay, Baron Mackay of Clashfern	1987–97
Chancellor of the Exchequer	Norman Lamont	1990–93
Foreign Secretary	Douglas Hurd	1989–95
Home Secretary	Kenneth Baker	1990–92
Minister of Agriculture, Fisheries and Food	John Gummer	1989–93
Secretary of State for Defence	Tom King	1989–92
Secretary of State for Education	Kenneth Clarke	1990–92
Secretary of State for Employment	Michael Howard	1990–92
Secretary of State for Energy	John Wakeham	1989–92
Secretary of State for the Environment	Michael Heseltine	1990–92
Secretary of State for Health	William Waldegrave	1990–92
Secretary of State for Northern Ireland	Peter Brooke	1989–92
Leader of the House of Commons; Lord President of the Council	John MacGregor	1990–92
Leader of the House of Lords; Lord Keeper of the Privy Seal	David Waddington, Baron Waddington	1990–92
Chancellor of the Duchy of Lancaster	Chris Patten	1990–92
Secretary of State for Social Security	Tony Newton	1989–92
Secretary of State for Scotland	Ian Lang	1990–95
Secretary of State for Trade and Industry; President of the Board of Trade	Peter Lilley	1990–92
Secretary of State for Transport	Malcolm Rifkind	1990–92
Chief Secretary to the Treasury	David Mellor	1990–92
Secretary of State for Wales	David Hunt	1990–93
Also attending cabinet meetings
Attorney General for England and Wales	Patrick Mayhew	1987–92
Chief Whip; Parliamentary Secretary to the Treasury	Richard Ryder	1990–95

== List of ministers ==
Members of the Cabinet are in bold face.

Office	Name	Date
Prime Minister First Lord of the Treasury Minister for the Civil Service	**John Major**	28 November 1990 – 2 May 1997
Lord High Chancellor of Great Britain	**James Mackay, Baron Mackay of Clashfern**	Continued in office
Leader of the House of Commons Lord President of the Council	**John MacGregor**	Continued in office
Leader of the House of Lords Lord Keeper of the Privy Seal	**David Waddington, Baron Waddington**	28 November 1990
Chancellor of the Exchequer	**Norman Lamont**	28 November 1990
Chief Secretary to the Treasury	**David Mellor**	28 November 1990
Minister of State for Treasury	Gillian Shephard	28 November 1990 – 11 April 1992
Parliamentary Secretary to the Treasury	Richard Ryder	28 November 1990
Financial Secretary to the Treasury	Francis Maude	Continued in office
Economic Secretary to the Treasury	John Maples	Continued in office – 14 April 1992
Lords of the Treasury	Tom Sackville	Continued in Office – 14 April 1992
Lords of the Treasury	Sydney Chapman	Continued in office – 14 April 1992
Lords of the Treasury	Greg Knight	Continued in office – 27 May 1993
Lords of the Treasury	Irvine Patnick	Continued in office – 20 July 1994
Lords of the Treasury	Nicholas Baker	3 December 1990 – 20 July 1994
Assistant Whips	Timothy Wood	Continued in office – 14 April 1992
Assistant Whips	Timothy Kirkhope	Continued in office – 15 December 1992
Assistant Whips	Timothy Boswell	Continued in office – 14 April 1992
Assistant Whips	Neil Hamilton	Continued in office – 14 April 1992
Assistant Whips	Nicholas Baker	Continued in office – 3 December 1990
Assistant Whips	David Davis	3 December 1990 – 28 May 1993
Foreign Secretary	**Douglas Hurd**	26 October 1989
Minister of State for Foreign and Commonwealth Affairs	Lynda Chalker (Note: Also Minister of Overseas Development; created Baroness Chalker of Wallasey 24 April 1992.)	Continued in office – 1 May 1997
Minister of State for Foreign and Commonwealth Affairs	Malcolm Sinclair, 20th Earl of Caithness	Continued in office – 15 April 1992
Minister of State for Foreign and Commonwealth Affairs	Tristan Garel-Jones	Continued in office – 27 May 1993
Minister of State for Foreign and Commonwealth Affairs	Douglas Hogg	Continued in office – 5 July 1995
Under-Secretary of State for Foreign and Commonwealth Affairs	Mark Lennox-Boyd	Continued in office
Minister for Overseas Development	Lynda Chalker (Note: Also Minister of State for Foreign and Commonwealth Affairs; created Baroness Chalker of Wallasey 24 April 1992.)	Continued in office
Home Secretary	**Kenneth Baker**	28 November 1990
Minister of State for Home Affairs	John Patten	Continued in office – 14 April 1992
Minister of State for Home Affairs	Robert Shirley, 13th Earl Ferrers	Continued in office – 20 July 1994
Minister of State for Home Affairs	Angela Rumbold	Continued in office – 14 April 1992
Under-Secretary of State for Home Affairs	Peter Lloyd	Continued in office – 15 April 1992
Minister of Agriculture, Fisheries and Food	**John Gummer**	Continued in office
Minister of State for Agriculture, Fisheries and Food	Jean Barker, Baroness Trumpington	Continued in office – 14 April 1992
Under-Secretary of State for Agriculture, Fisheries and Food	David Curry	Continued in office – 14 April 1992
Under-Secretary of State for Agriculture, Fisheries and Food	David Maclean	Continued in office – 14 April 1992
Minister for the Arts (Note: Functions transferred on 11 April 1992 to Department of National Heritage.)	Tim Renton	28 November 1990
Secretary of State for Defence	**Tom King**	Continued in office
Minister of State for the Armed Forces	Archie Hamilton	Continued in office
Minister of State for Defence Procurement	Alan Clark	Continued in office
Under-Secretary of State for Defence	Kenneth Carlisle	28 November 1990 – 15 April 1992
Under-Secretary of State for Defence	Arthur Gore, 9th Earl of Arran	28 November 1990 – 15 April 1992
Secretary of State for Education and Science (Note: Reorganised as Office of Education 10 April 1992.)	**Kenneth Clarke**	Continued in office
Minister of State, Education and Science	Timothy Eggar	Continued in office – 14 April 1992
Under-Secretary of State, Education and Science	Alan Howarth	Continued in office – 14 April 1992
Under-Secretary of State, Education and Science	Michael Fallon	Continued in office – 14 April 1992
Under-Secretary of State, Education and Science	Robert Atkins (Note: Under-Secretary of State, Sport.)	28 November 1990 – 14 April 1992
Secretary of State for Employment	**Michael Howard**	Continued in office
Under-Secretary of State, Employment	Robert Jackson	Continued in office – 14 April 1992
Under-Secretary of State, Employment	Eric Forth	Continued in office – 14 April 1992
Under-Secretary of State, Employment	Nicholas Lowther, 2nd Viscount Ullswater	Continued in office – 16 September 1993
Secretary of State for Energy	**John Wakeham**	Continued in office (Note: Office abolished 11 April 1992.)
Under-Secretary of State, Energy	Colin Moynihan	Continued in office – 11 April 1992
Under-Secretary of State, Energy	David Heathcoat-Amory	28 November 1990 – 11 April 1992
Secretary of State for the Environment	**Michael Heseltine**	28 November 1990
Minister of State for Local Government	Michael Portillo	Continued in office
Minister of State for Housing	Sir George Young 6th Baronet	28 November 1990
Minister of State for Environment and Countryside	David Trippier	28 November 1990
Minister of State, Environment	Emily Blatch, Baroness Blatch	21 May 1991 – 13 April 1992
Under-Secretary of State, Environment	Emily Blatch, Baroness Blatch	Continued in office – 21 May 1991
Under-Secretary of State, Environment	Robert Key	Continued in office – 15 April 1992
Under-Secretary of State, Environment	Tim Yeo	28 November 1990 – 15 April 1992
Under-Secretary of State, Environment	Tony Baldry	28 November 1990 – 20 July 1994
Secretary of State for Health	**William Waldegrave**	Continued in office
Minister of State, Health	Virginia Bottomley	Continued in office
Under-Secretary of State, Health and Social Security	Gloria Hooper, Baroness Hooper	Continued in office – 14 April 1992
Secretary of State for Social Security	**Tony Newton**	Continued in office
Minister of State, Social Security	Nicholas Scott	Continued in office – 20 July 1994
Under-Secretary of State, Social Security	Oliver Eden, 8th Baron Henley	Continued in office - 16 September 1993
Under-Secretary of State, Social Security	Michael Jack	28 November 1990 – 14 April 1992
Under-Secretary of State, Social Security	Ann Widdecombe	30 November 1990 – 27 May 1993
Chancellor of the Duchy of Lancaster	**Chris Patten**	28 November 1990
Secretary of State for Northern Ireland	**Peter Brooke**	Continued in office
Minister of State, Northern Ireland	Brian Mawhinney	28 November 1990 – 14 April 1992
Minister of State, Northern Ireland	John Ganzoni, 2nd Baron Belstead (Note: Also Paymaster General.)	28 November 1990 – 14 April 1992
Under-Secretary of State, Northern Ireland	Richard Needham (6th Earl of Kilmorey)	Continued in office – 15 April 1992
Under-Secretary of State, Northern Ireland	Jeremy Hanley	3 December 1990 – 27 May 1993
Paymaster General	John Ganzoni, 2nd Baron Belstead (Note: Also Minister of State, Northern Ireland.)	28 November 1990
Secretary of State for Scotland	**Ian Lang**	28 November 1990
Minister of State for Scotland	Michael Forsyth	Continued in office – 14 April 1992
Under-Secretary of State for Scotland	Lord James Douglas-Hamilton	Continued in office – 6 July 1995
Under-Secretary of State for Scotland	Thomas Galbraith, 2nd Baron Strathclyde	Continued in office – 14 April 1992
Under-Secretary of State for Scotland	Allan Stewart	28 November 1990 – 8 February 1995
Minister for Trade	Tim Sainsbury	Continued in office
Secretary of State for Trade and Industry	**Peter Lilley**	Continued in office
Minister for Industry	Alexander Fermor-Hesketh, 3rd Baron Hesketh	Continued in office
Minister for Industry	vacant	21 May 1991
Minister for Corporate Affairs	John Redwood	Continued in office – 13 April 1992
Under-Secretary of State for Trade and Industry	Edward Leigh	Continued in office – 27 May 1993
Under-Secretary of State for Trade and Industry	The Lord Reay	22 May 1991 – 14 April 1992
Secretary of State for Transport	**Malcolm Rifkind**	28 November 1990
Minister of State, Transport	Ivon Moore-Brabazon, 3rd Baron Brabazon of Tara	Continued in office – 14 April 1992
Minister for Public Transport	Roger Freeman	28 November 1990 – 20 July 1994
Under-Secretary of State for Transport	Patrick McLoughlin	Continued in office – 14 April 1992
Under-Secretary of State for Transport	Christopher Chope	Continued in office – 14 April 1992
Secretary of State for Wales	**David Hunt**	Continued in office
Minister of State for Wales	Wyn Roberts	Continued in office – 20 July 1994
Under-Secretary of State for Wales	Nicholas Bennett	3 December 1990 – 14 April 1992
Attorney General	Sir Patrick Mayhew	Continued in office
Solicitor General	Sir Nicholas Lyell	Continued in office
Lord Advocate	Peter Fraser, Baron Fraser of Carmyllie	Continued in office
Solicitor General for Scotland	Alan Rodger (Note: Not an MP.)	Continued in office
Treasurer of the Household	Alastair Goodlad	Continued in office
Comptroller of the Household	David Lightbown	28 November 1990
Vice-Chamberlain of the Household	John Taylor	28 November 1990
Captain of the Gentlemen-at-Arms	Bertram Bowyer, 2nd Baron Denham	Continued in office
Captain of the Gentlemen-at-Arms	Alexander Fermor-Hesketh, 3rd Baron Hesketh	22 May 1991
Captain of the Yeomen of the Guard	Andrew Davidson, 2nd Viscount Davidson	Continued in office
Captain of the Yeomen of the Guard	Michael Bowes-Lyon, 18th Earl of Strathmore and Kinghorne	30 December 1991
Lords-in-Waiting	Richard Long, 4th Viscount Long	Continued in Office - 2 May 1997
Lords-in-Waiting	Hugh Mackay, 14th Lord Reay	Continued in office – 21 May 1991
Lords-in-Waiting	Michael Bowes-Lyon, 18th Earl of Strathmore and Kinghorne	Continued in office – 30 December 1991
Lords-in-Waiting	Hugh Cavendish, Baron Cavendish of Furness	Continued in office – 22 April 1993
Lords-in-Waiting	William Astor, 4th Viscount Astor	Continued in office – 16 September 1993
Lords-in-Waiting	Frederick Curzon, 7th Earl Howe	30 May 1991 – 15 April 1992
Lords-in-Waiting	Jean Denton, Baroness Denton of Wakefield	January 1992 – 15 April 1992

== Footnotes ==
Preceded by Third Thatcher ministry	Government of the United Kingdom; 1990–1992	Succeeded by Second Major ministry
