= Party political broadcast =

Type of political ad

A party political broadcast (also known, in pre-election campaigning periods, as a party election broadcast) is a television or radio broadcast made by a political party.

In the United Kingdom the Communications Act 2003 prohibits (and previously the Broadcasting Act 1990 and earlier broadcasting practice prohibited) political advertising on television or radio; parties are instead allocated broadcast slots (usually around five minutes long) free of charge on broadcast channels using a formula set by Parliament. From 1953 to 2012, government and opposition commentaries were broadcast on the evening of the annual budget statement. Ministerial Broadcasts are occasionally made on urgent matters of a non-partisan nature.

A similar format exists in the Republic of Ireland, though for smaller parties, because a greater number of them are represented in the Dáil, their allocated time may be as little as one or two minutes each.

In Canada, the Canada Elections Act includes provisions for free-time election broadcasts (in addition to paid advertising) during Canadian federal elections, on all licensed terrestrial television and radio networks; notably, however, none of Canada's main English-language private television networks (CTV, Global and Citytv) actually operates under a network license anymore, meaning that in actual practice in the 2020s this provision applies only to the CBC's main radio and TV networks, and the private French-language networks TVA and Noovo. CBC Television formerly broadcast the regular weekly series The Nation's Business, in which Members of Parliament from all parties could give a short speech on a political issue, but this series no longer airs.

In Asia, party political broadcasts have existed in Singapore since 1980, where they are known as political party broadcasts. In Japan, party political broadcasts are known as seiken hōsō (政見放送). In Brazil, party political broadcasts are known as horário político while in Chile, they are known as franja electoral.

== See also ==
- Zendtijd voor Politieke Partijen — Netherlands equivalent
- Franja electoral — Latin American equivalent
- Ministerial broadcast — representing the government rather than the governing party
- Cadena nacional — a similar Latin American equivalent
