= Countries of the United Kingdom by GVA per capita =

Economic measure of UK countries

The countries of the United Kingdom by GVA per capita sets out the gross value added per capita for each of the countries of the United Kingdom as well as separate figures for the nine English regions.

== 2022 ==
Rank	Name	GVA per capita	Total GVA
1	England ∟ London ∟ South East ∟ East of England ∟ South West ∟ North West ∟ West Midlands ∟ East Midlands ∟ Yorkshire and the Humber ∟ North East	£33,976 £58,557 £35,845 £29,586 £29,882 £29,232 £26,632 £26,099 £27,309 £23,521	£1940 billion £519 billion £336 billion £189 billion £172 billion £220 billion £160 billion £129 billion £151 billion £63 billion
2	Scotland	£30,419	£166 billion
3	Northern Ireland	£26,119	£50 billion
4	Wales	£23,804	£75 billion
5	Extraregio territory (Note: The extraregio figure refers mainly to revenue derived from sale of North Sea oil, vast majority of which (ca. 90%) lies within Scottish waters.))		£16 billion
	United Kingdom	£33,227	£2,246 billion

== See also ==
- Countries of the United Kingdom § Statistics
- Countries of the United Kingdom by population
- Economy of the United Kingdom
- United Kingdom budget
- List of countries by area
- Income in the United Kingdom
