= 1978 United Kingdom budget =

- Presented: 11 April 1978
- Country: United Kingdom
- Parliament: 47th
- Party: Labour Party
- Chancellor: Denis Healey

The 1978 United Kingdom budget was delivered by Denis Healey, the Chancellor of the Exchequer, to the House of Commons on 11 April 1978. It was the sixth and penultimate budget to be presented by Healey, and the first to be broadcast on the radio. It saw the chancellor unveil a programme of tax cuts worth £2.4bn, including reductions in Corporation Tax for small businesses, and Capital gains tax. A new temporary lower rate of income tax was also introduced, which would be abolished by Geoffrey Howe in the 1980 budget, while the basic rate of income tax was cut by 1%. Healey also reintroduced free school milk for children aged 7 to 11. He told the House that for once he was not asking people to make any sacrifices. Labour MPs gave the statement a lukewarm reception, while the Liberal Party, which had recently been in an alliance with the government following the Lib–Lab pact, were more enthusiastic. In her response, the Conservative leader, Margaret Thatcher, the then Leader of the Opposition, claimed the tax cuts would soon disappear.
