= 2026 United Kingdom budget =

October 2026 United Kingdom budget
- Presented: 28 October 2026
- Country: United Kingdom
- Parliament: 59th
- Party: Labour Party
- Chancellor: John Healey

The 2026 United Kingdom budget was delivered to the House of Commons by John Healey, the chancellor of the exchequer, on 28 October 2026. It was Healey's first budget since his appointment as Chancellor in the ministry of Andy Burnham. The date of the budget was announced on 31 July.

== Key measures ==
=== Cost of living support ===
A one-off £100 payment to about 20 million households in Council Tax bands A-D in to help with rising energy bills, alongside more funding for local authorities to provide targeted additional support, called the Household Energy Payment costing about £2.6 billion. Standing charges will be removed from household gas bills, with costs attributed to the units consumed instead, generally assisting smaller households.

=== Taxes ===
There were only small changes to taxation. A 2% tax increase on income from savings and property rental, and the surcharge on bank profits increased from 3% to 6% for 15 months, were announced. The Small Business Rate Relief threshold was increased so many more small retail, hospitality and leisure businesses would not pay any business rates, paid for by ensuring online marketplaces collect VAT on behalf of their business clients. The previous decision to reduce the annual contribution limit to tax-free cash Individual Savings Accounts to £12,000 was cancelled.

=== Foreign affairs ===
The budget allocated over £10 billion of additional financial support to Ukraine, alongside the existing commitment of £3 billion a year in military support for as long as needed. This included £7 billion of economic support over three years — £5.5 billion through World Bank loan guarantees, a £3 billion increase in UK Export Finance (UKEF) credit, and an increase of UK military support this year to £4.3 billion.

From 2029, taxation of foreign sovereign investments will be modernised bringing certain real estate income and gains into UK tax.

== Reception ==
BBC political editor Chris Mason described the budget as cautious and a "flotilla of small measures".
