= 1995 United Kingdom budget =

- Presented: 28 November 1995
- Country: United Kingdom
- Parliament: 51st
- Party: Conservative Party
- Chancellor: Kenneth Clarke

The 1995 United Kingdom budget was delivered by Kenneth Clarke, the Chancellor of the Exchequer, to the House of Commons on 28 November 1995. It was Clarke's third budget, and one of the shortest budget speeches in modern history. In his statement, Clarke reduced the middle rate of income tax by 1p to 24p, and after announcing that his spending reductions for the previous year had exceeded expectations by more than £3bn, announced plans to increase spending on healthcare, education and policing. His budget was criticised by members of the Conservative Party for not including more tax cuts, while Shadow Chancellor Gordon Brown of the Labour Party dismissed it as "the 7p up, 1p down budget".

== Overview ==
Clarke opened his third budget by declaring that the UK economy had now been growing for almost four years, with an additional half a million jobs created since the recession at the beginning of the 1990s and the UK having more of its people in employment than any other country with in the European Union. The International Monetary Fund was forecasting Britain would be joint top with Germany for growth among the G7 nations, and inflation was at its lowest for 50 years and on target to reach 2.5% by the end of the current parliament. The economy had grown by 4% in 1994–95, and was forecast to grow by 2.75% for 1995–96 and 3% for 1996–97. It was also unaffected by the world economic slowdown that had occurred during 1995. Manufacturing had grown by 12% over the past year, and consumer spending was also expected to grow. The public sector borrowing requirement was forecast to be £29bn (Note: about £59bn at 2021 prices) for 1995–96, £7bn (Note: about £14bn at 2021 prices) less than had been predicted in the 1994 budget, and £16bn (Note: about £33bn at 2021 prices) less than forecast in the budget of November 1993. On government plans to reduce public spending to 40% of national income, Clarke said that it stood at 42% for the present year, and was on course to reach the government's target by 1997–98; £53bn (Note: about £108bn at 2021 prices) had been taken out of public spending since Clarke had become chancellor.

With the prospect of a general election in the not too distant future, pressure was mounting on the chancellor to deliver a budget that would please potential Conservative voters. Some MPs from the right of the party were calling for him to implement tax cuts, while at the same time public services were coming under financial pressure. Clarke ultimately delivered a budget that he described as "sensible" in which he increased spending on health, education and policing, while also cutting the basic rate of income tax by 1p and raised the 20p lower-rate band by £700, meaning that 6 million taxpayers would only pay tax at the 20p rate. He told the House he did not want to "do a Budget just for the next day's headlines", while saying of the increase in spending for public services, "I think people wanted me to spend more money on hospitals, more money on schools, more money on the police service".

Clarke said that spending on the National Health Service had increased by 70% in real terms since the Conservatives came to power in 1979, and made similar claims for spending on education and policing. Spending on health would increase by £1bn (Note: about £2bn at 2021 prices) for 1996–97, while an extra £650m (Note: about £1329m at 2021 prices) would be reinvested into patient care from savings made in the health service. An additional £700m (Note: about £1432m at 2021 prices) would also be invested as a result of the Private finance initiative. Education would receive an additional £830m (Note: about £1697m at 2021 prices) during the next financial year, while there would be funding for an extra 5,000 police officers over the coming three years. This would partly be paid for through a 12% savings made at Whitehall, as well as an annual £5bn (Note: about £10bn at 2021 prices) saving in the Social Security bill as a result of changes to benefits for asylum seekers, lone parents, and savings as a result of tackling benefit fraud.

Finally, the Private Finance Initiative was said to be worth £2bn (Note: about £4bn at 2021 prices) a year, and it was expected that the government would have agreed £14bn (Note: about £29bn at 2021 prices) of contracts by 1998–99.

=== Key points ===
- 1p reduction in the basic rate of income tax to 24p
- 20p lower-rate band increased by £700
- 40% threshold raised by £1,200
- Married Couples Tax Allowance increased by £70
- Basic personal allowance increased by £240
- Tax reduced on savings income to 20%
- Introduction of a landfill tax of £7 from 1 October 1996
- Spending on health to increase by £1bn, on education by £830m, and funding for an additional 5,000 police officers over three years
- Mortgage interest relief to remain unchanged for the duration of the current parliament
- Changes to share ownership schemes
- Corporation Tax for small companies reduced to 24%
- Business Rates reduced from 10% to 7%
- Inheritance tax raised to £200,000
- Inheritance tax relief on unquoted shareholdings increased to 100%
- Savings threshold at which state help is cut off to people paying their own nursing home fees is doubled to £16,000
- Inland Revenue to consult on allowing those with occupational pension schemes to take a variable pension
- Reducing the age of qualification for Pensioners' Bonds from 65 to 60
- Road Tax to increase by £5 while lorry tax remains unchanged
- Petrol and diesel to rise by 3.5p a litre from 6pm, with super unleaded petrol to rise by 4p from May 1996
- Excise duty on whisky reduced by 27p a bottle
- Duty on wine and beer frozen
- Duty on cider to increase by 8p a bottle
- Duty on pack of 20 cigarettes increased by 15p
- Duty on betting reduced by 1% from 1 March 1996

== Reaction ==
Tony Blair, the leader of the Opposition, described the budget as a "flop" and claimed people would be worse off: ""One of the reasons that it flopped is that people realise that they are still £67-a-year worse off and they realise also that the Budget has done nothing to address the long term needs of the economy." His Shadow Chancellor, Gordon Brown, described it as "the 7p up, 1p down budget".

The Guardian has noted that those on the right of the Conservative Party objected to his moderate tax cuts and increase in public spending.
