= Tax-exempt special savings account =

In the UK, the tax-exempt special savings account (TESSA) was one of a number of tax-free savings accounts. The TESSA was announced by John Major in his only budget as Chancellor of the Exchequer in 1990 (the "budget for savings") and at first had a five-year lifespan. The TESSA was intended to be a low-risk complement to the personal equity plan (PEP) which would be attractive to a wider range of savers. The accounts were replaced by Individual Savings Accounts in 1999.

== Eligibility ==
An individual aged 18 or over was able to open a TESSA with a bank, building society or other financial institution from 1 January 1991 to 5 April 1999. A specific requirement was the presentation of the applicant's National Insurance number, to ensure only one TESSA (tax free) account investment could be operated by the individual per year. Interest on the TESSA was free from UK income tax. The favourable tax treatment of a TESSA lasted for five years, and it was possible to invest up to £9,000, with a maximum investment of £3,000 in the first year and £1,800 in each of the second to fifth years (although, if the maximum was invested in the first four years, only £600 could be added in the fifth year). Withdrawals were permitted within the first five years: tax relief was clawed back if any of the invested capital was taken out, but withdrawals of interest did not trigger a clawback of the tax relief.

== Evolution ==
'Follow-on' TESSAs were introduced in 1995 to permit all of the capital (but not the tax-free interest) from an original TESSA to be 'rolled over' into a new TESSA. Other than permitting all of the capital from the original account to be invested in the first year, which could easily exceed the usual £3,000 first-year limit, a 'follow-on' TESSA was subject to the same conditions as any other TESSA.

== Phasing out ==
TESSAs were replaced from 1999 by Individual Savings Accounts (ISAs). The final TESSAs matured on 5 April 2004, and the original capital (but not the tax-free interest) could again be 'rolled over' into a new income-tax-free investment, a TESSA-only ISA (TOISA). This was a form of cash ISA that could be opened using either capital that was originally invested in a TESSA and that had not been withdrawn, or with funds transferred from another TOISA.

From 6 April 2007 there was no practical difference between TOISAs and cash ISAs, and transfers into cash ISAs were permitted. On 5 April 2008, TOISAs ceased being legally distinct and are now interchangeable with cash ISAs.
