= 1989 United Kingdom budget =

- Presented: 14 March 1989
- Country: United Kingdom
- Parliament: 50th
- Party: Conservative Party
- Chancellor: Nigel Lawson

The 1989 United Kingdom budget was delivered by Nigel Lawson, the Chancellor of the Exchequer, to the House of Commons on 14 March 1989. It was the sixth and final budget to be presented by Lawson during his tenure as Chancellor, and took a much more cautious approach to the UK economy than previous budgets delivered by Lawson. It was outlined against the backdrop of mounting economic turbulence with increasing interest rates and rising inflation. 1989 was also the final pre-television era budget to be presented to the House of Commons.

== Overview ==
Lawson had begun to raise the UK's interest rate in June 1988 as a way to control inflation, and by March 1989 the interest rate had reached 15%, while inflation was running at 7.5%. In his budget statement, Lawson predicted inflation would continue to rise for a short while, peaking at 8%, before dropping back to 4.5% by early 1990. The previous year had also seen a housing boom, which had started to slow by the time this budget was presented.

Among the measures announced by the Chancellor were a reduction in the amount of National Insurance contributions, something that would leave earner £3 per week better off, while the thresholds for inheritance tax and VAT were increased. The rule that penalised state pensioners who continued to work beyond their retirement was abolished, while proposals were outlined for a tax relief scheme to enable elderly people to buy private health insurance. A 3.6p per gallon reduction was announced on excise duty on unleaded petrol, making it almost 10p a gallon cheaper than leaded, but there were no changes announced to duty for alcohol or cigarettes.

== Reaction ==
Responding to the budget, John Smith, the Shadow Chancellor of the Exchequer, described the private health insurance tax relief scheme as "an old-fashioned hand-out to the private sector", while Neil Kinnock, the leader of the Labour Party, called Lawson "a chancellor who is fast becoming Mr Inflation".

== Legacy ==
The 1989 budget was the final budget statement to be delivered by Lawson. He would resign later that year following disagreement with Prime Minister Margaret Thatcher over exchange rate policy, and was succeeded as Chancellor by John Major. The 1990 budget would also be the first to be shown on television, making 1989 the final pre-television era budget. It is also the last budget to be presided by the Speaker instead of the Chairman of Ways and Means.
