= 1983 United Kingdom budget =

- Presented: 15 March 1983
- Country: United Kingdom
- Parliament: 48th
- Party: Conservative Party
- Chancellor: Geoffrey Howe

The 1983 United Kingdom budget was delivered by Geoffrey Howe, the Chancellor of the Exchequer, to the House of Commons on 15 March 1983. It was the final budget to be presented before the 1983 general election and the last to be presented by Howe. He announced a programme of tax cuts worth around £2bn for individuals and £750m for business, as well as increasing personal allowances by 14%, 8.5% above the rate of inflation. Social Security benefits were also raised. The Conservatives went on to win the election, but Howe would subsequently be replaced as chancellor by Nigel Lawson in a post-election cabinet reshuffle.

== Overview ==
Howe described his budget as one designed to "further the living standards and employment opportunities of all our people", and announced tax cuts that amounted to around £2bn for individuals and £750m (Note: about £2159m at 2021 prices) for industry. This included an increase in personal allowances worth 14%, which was 8.5% higher than needed to keep pace with the rate of inflation, but income tax rates remained unchanged. Corporation Tax on the profits of small businesses was reduced by 2% to 38%, while the employers' national insurance surcharge was reduced from 1.5% to 1%. North Sea oil companies were granted tax relief worth around £800m, (Note: about £2303m at 2021 prices) which would be phased in over four years. There was an increase in Social Security benefits. Excise duty on beer was increased by 1p. There was also a 5p duty increase on a bottle of wine, a 25p increase on a litre of spirits, and a 3p increase on a packet of 20 cigarettes.

== Reaction ==
Labour leader Michael Foot, the Leader of the Opposition, described the budget as "squalidly inadequate", while Social Democratic Party leader Roy Jenkins, himself a former chancellor, accused the Conservatives of delivering "a budget for votes".

Some Conservatives expressed their disappointment that no changes had been made to income tax, to which Howe responded, "It cannot be put right in one Budget or even one Parliament".

== Aftermath ==
The Conservatives went on to win the general election, but the 1983 budget would prove to be Howe's last as chancellor. He was shortly to be replaced by Nigel Lawson, who was promoted from the Department of Energy, and would go on to present the 1984 budget, as well as several subsequent budgets after that.
