= 1994 United Kingdom budget =

- Presented: 29 November 1994
- Country: United Kingdom
- Parliament: 51st
- Party: Conservative Party
- Chancellor: Kenneth Clarke

The 1994 United Kingdom budget (officially titled A Budget for Jobs) was delivered by Kenneth Clarke, the Chancellor of the Exchequer, to the House of Commons on 29 November 1994. It was the second budget to be presented by Clarke since his appointment as chancellor the previous year, and its central focus was a planned £24bn worth of tax cuts. Clarke also renewed his commitment to increasing Value Added Tax (VAT) on fuel, but pledged to soften the impact this would have on pensioners. The statement took place shortly after the Party Whip had been withdrawn from eight Conservative backbenchers, leaving the government without a working majority, and amid questions about the future of John Major's leadership of the party. In response to the budget, Tony Blair, leader of the Labour Party, said it would be remembered as the "VAT on fuel budget".

VAT on fuel was due to be raised from 8% to 17.5% in April 1995, but after the government subsequently lost a vote on the legislation to implement the increase, the 1994 budget was followed in December of that year by an emergency financial statement in which Clarke was forced to announce measures to plug the shortfall this would create. He cancelled the majority of the social security help for pensioners that had been outlined in his budget, and raised excise duty on tobacco and alcohol. Clarke's successor as Chancellor, Gordon Brown, reduced VAT on domestic fuel to 5% after Labour won the 1997 general election.

== Background ==
The 1994 budget took place at a difficult time for the Conservative Party, which had removed the Party Whip from eight of its backbench MPs who, during the previous week, had voted against legislation to increase subsidies to the European Union. This meant the party had no overall majority in the House of Commons at the time of the budget. The Conservative Government had also introduced Value Added Tax (VAT) on domestic fuel the previous year, which was unpopular with the public. VAT on fuel of 8% had come into force in April 1994, and was scheduled to increase to 17.5% from April 1995.

== Overview ==
Titled A Budget for Jobs, Clarke described his 1994 statement as having three main priorities: To keep the economy on track to sustain growth, to use the recovery to create more jobs, and to strengthen the economy in the longer term. At its centre was a £24bn (Note: about £51bn at 2021 prices) programme of tax cuts which was to be achieved over three years, and would be the biggest programme of tax cuts since 1984.

Following the recession of the early 1990s, economic recovery had been under way "at a modest pace" for two and a half years, and was providing the UK with the strongest recovery in Europe. Clarke expected economic growth to be at 4% for 1994–95, and 3% for 1995–96. Inflation was described as being well below the European average, and at its lowest since the 1960s. It was expected to be 2% in 1995. Government plans were announced to set interest rates to keep inflation between 1% and 4%. UK exports were expected to grow by 8% during 1994–95, while investment in plant and machinery would grow by 12%. Consumer demand was much lower, and was forecast to grow by 2–3% over the year. Clarke reported that UK unemployment had fallen by 450,000 since December 1992, with the UK the only country in Europe where unemployment had fallen.

During 1993–94 the government had reduced its planned public expenditure by more than had been forecast, and it was now predicted to be £15bn (Note: about £32bn at 2021 prices) lower over a three-year period than originally estimated. Expenditure would be reduced by £28bn (Note: about £59bn at 2021 prices) over 1994–95. The Balance of Payment was expected to be reduced by £6bn (Note: about £13bn at 2021 prices) for 1994–95, while the public sector borrowing requirement (PSBR) had fallen from £45bn (Note: about £95bn at 2021 prices) in 1993–94 to £34bn (Note: about £72bn at 2021 prices) in 1994–95. Going forward, Clarke had reduced previously forecast amounts the government had expected to borrow from £30bn (Note: about £63bn at 2021 prices) to £21bn (Note: about £44bn at 2021 prices) in 1995–96, from £21bn to £13bn (Note: about £28bn at 2021 prices) in 1996–97, and from £12bn (Note: about £25bn at 2021 prices) to £5bn in 1997–98. Borrowing was also forecast to be equal to government net capital expenditure by 1996–97, with plans to eliminate government borrowing by the end of the decade.

The private finance initiative (PFI) was growing rapidly, with the £370m (Note: about £783m at 2021 prices) invested in public transport and £100m (Note: about £212m at 2021 prices) of private investment in the National Health Service both cited as examples, with more PFI investment to follow. A third of finance for universities was also coming from the private sector by November 1994. It was forecast that £5bn (Note: about £11bn at 2021 prices) of capital investment from PFI contracts would be announced during 1995, with the first four private finance transport schemes to shortly go out for tender. Savings in the cost of central government were also forecast, and was expected to be reduced by 10% over the four years to 1997–98, while the number of civil servants would fall to below 500,000 over the same period, their lowest since World War II. Local authority cost were also undergoing reduction, and would be 2.2% in 1995–96.

The chancellor made no major changes to taxation. The lower, middle and upper tax bands remained at their pre-budget levels, although Clarke did increase the 20p rate to £3,200, declaring the "one in five of all taxpayers will now only pay tax at the lowest rate". A full National Insurance rebate of up to twelve months was announced for employers taking on a new employee who had been unemployed for two years or longer, effective from April 1996, lower rate National Insurance contributions would fall by 0.6%, cutting the cost of providing lower paid jobs by £230m (Note: about £487m at 2021 prices) in 1995–96. After renewing his commitment to increasing VAT on fuel from 8% to 15%, he acknowledged this would cause difficulty for some and announced a package of help worth £10bn (Note: about £21bn at 2021 prices) for pensioners, which would include grants for insulating homes and an increase in cold weather payments. The budget included no plans for an increase in duty on alcohol, largely due to the effect the Channel Tunnel was having on the UK drinks industry, but an increase was announced for tobacco, with an increase of 10p on a packet of 20 cigarettes.

=== Key points ===
- 20p rate of income tax raised to £3,200, (Note: about £6771 at 2021 prices) but income tax remains otherwise unchanged
- Corporation Tax to remain unchanged
- Personal Equity Plans scheme to be extended
- First Tax-exempt special savings accounts (TESSAs) due to expire shortly: Interest accumulated on TESSSAs can be reinvested in a new TESSA once it expires
- Education bill to increase by an additional 1% in 1995–96
- Student loans and grants to increase in line with inflation
- Provisions announced to increase police by 3%
- £800m (Note: about £1693m at 2021 prices) for new urban regeneration projects over coming three years
- Inflation was lower than expected for 1993–94, but money will not be clawed back from health service; NHS spending to consequently grow by £1.3bn (Note: about £3bn at 2021 prices) in real terms through 1994–95
- Efficiency savings in NHS to release a further £600m (Note: about £1270m at 2021 prices) for patient care
- Gas prices to rise for the first time since 1991
- VAT increase on domestic fuel from 8% to 15% to go ahead (withdrawn on 7 December)
- £10m (Note: about £21bn at 2021 prices) of financial help offered to pensioners as compensation for VAT on fuel increase (withdrawn on 7 December)
- Extra £52 for single pensions and £73 on couples pensions for 1995–96
- Extra £68 for single pensions and £96 for couples from 1996 to 1997
- Community Action Programme to be extended to help people to find work
- Plans announced to speed up the payment of Family Credit
- Help with housing benefit to continue for first four weeks of new job
- Job Finders Grants announced
- £10 weekly premium for fulltime workers on Family Credit to encourage full-time work
- Reform of Housing Benefit so it may no longer be paid in full in some circumstances from October 1995
- Further measures to limit mortgage payment support through the benefits system
- Measures to tackle benefit fraud to save £2bn (Note: about £4bn at 2021 prices) over next two years
- Employers to receive full National Insurance rebate of up to twelve months when taking on someone who has been unemployed for two years or longer
- Lower rates of employers' National Insurance contributions to be reduced by 0.6%, cutting the cost of providing lower paid jobs by £230m in 1995–96
- Proposals for a landfill tax are announced, with a provisional start date of 1996
- Car Tax disc to increase by £5 to £135
- No increase for lorry tax
- Number of concession classes for Road Tax reduced from 132 to nine from 1 July 1995
- Accessories fitted for disabled people in company cars to no longer be taxed as a benefit-in-kind
- Excise duty on petrol to increase by 2p a litre for both leaded and unleaded
- Duty on diesel to increase by 3p a litre
- Duty on gas and oil to increase by 4p a litre
- Duty frozen on road fuel gases
- No increase in excise duty on beer, wines or spirits
- Duty on a packet of 20 cigarettes to increase by 10p
- Betting and gaming to be deregulated
- Gaming Machine Licence Duty to increase to its 1987 real terms value
- 2% duty in pools betting duty to continue for a further five years providing the pools industry continues to fund the Foundation for Sport and the Arts

== Reaction ==
In his response to the statement, Tony Blair, leader of the Labour Party and leader of the Opposition, said the budget would become known as the "VAT on fuel budget", and, with reference a planned reduction in mortgage relief to 15% and a reduction in the married couples' tax allowance from April 1995, raised the issue of "other tax rises" that he claimed had not been mentioned in the budget.

The City of London dismissed the budget as a "jam tomorrow" budget.

== Emergency financial statement ==
Clarke argued the revenue that would be raised from increasing VAT on fuel was needed in order for his budget to be implemented and that he would have to cut public spending without it, but many of his party's own MPs feared introducing it could cost the Conservatives votes at the next general election. The legislation to increase VAT on fuel from 8% to 17.5% had its second reading before the House of Commons on 6 December 1994, and was defeated 319–311 in the subsequent vote. In addition to opposition MPs, 15 Conservatives (including the eight suspended MPs) also voted against the proposals, as well as the pro-Conservative Ulster Unionists. Responding to the vote, Clarke told the House, "It is only right that we should listen to the views expressed here. I have therefore decided not to proceed with the second stage of VAT". On 7 December, Jonathan Aitken, the Chief Secretary to the Treasury, confirmed there would be "further reductions in public spending and a raising of taxes in other areas".

Faced with a financial shortfall as a result of the money that would not now be raised from the increase, Clarke made an emergency financial statement to the House in which he outlined measures to plug the gap. This included cancelling some of the proposed £10bn help for pensioners, as well as raising excise duty, with 6p on a packet of 20 cigarettes and 4% on alcohol.

== Legacy ==
In October 1995, the Labour Party announced they would reduce the amount of VAT on domestic fuel from 8% to 5% if they were to form the next government, and the pledge was included in their manifesto for the 1997 general election. In his budget of 2 July 1997, Chancellor Gordon Brown announced VAT on domestic fuel would be reduced to 5% from 1 September 1997.

A 1997 research paper prepared by the House of Commons Library indicated the 8% VAT rate raised £850m (Note: about £1799m at 2021 prices) in 1994–95, and £1.1bn (Note: about £2bn at 2021 prices) in 1995–96.
