= 1992 United Kingdom budget =

- Presented: 10 March 1992
- Country: United Kingdom
- Parliament: 50th
- Party: Conservative Party
- Chancellor: Norman Lamont

The 1992 United Kingdom budget (officially titled A budget for the recovery) was delivered by Norman Lamont, the Chancellor of the Exchequer, to the House of Commons on 10 March 1992. It was the second budget to be presented by Lamont. It was also the last before the 1992 general election, which was called the following day, and shaped the Conservative Party's election campaign for that year.

The 1992 budget introduced the 20p rate of income tax on the first £2,000 of earnings, as well as increasing personal allowances in line with inflation. Lamont also confirmed plans to unify tax and spending into one annual budget statement should the Conservatives win the election. Opposition Labour Party leader Neil Kinnock dismissed the statement as a "a panic-stricken pre-election sweetener", but Labour's opposition to introducing the lower tax rate enabled the Conservatives to paint them as a high-tax party, a strategy that ultimately succeeded in winning them the election.

== Background ==
By 1992 the UK was starting to emerge from the recession of the early 1990s, but the economy was still struggling, and the public sector borrowing requirement (PSBR) had reached £28bn. (Note: about £62bn at 2021 prices) The time for a general election was approaching, and both main parties, the Conservatives and Labour, were roughly equal in the polls. The Conservatives were keen to offer the public an incentive of tax cuts, something Larry Elliott, political editor of The Guardian, argues Lamont was able to do by asking HM Treasury to revise the UK's public deficit figures, making them appear more favourable than they actually were. They would be revised upward again once the election was over.

== Overview ==
Chief among the announcements in the 1992 budget was Lamont's decision to introduce the 20p lower rate of income tax for the first £2,000 of earnings, a rate which he said would be expanded over time to become the basic rate of income tax. Personal tax allowances were increased in line with inflation, although the 40p top rate of income tax was left unchanged. Sales tax on new cars was halved to 5%, while there was a decrease in betting duty. Lamont also announced that should the Conservatives win the next election, in the future tax and spending would be incorporated into a unified budget that would be presented in the autumn.

=== Key points ===
- Introduction of a new 20p rate of income tax for the first £2,000 of earnings
- Personal allowances to rise with inflation, but 40p top tax rate remains unchanged
- Tax on sale of new cars halved to 5%
- Excise duty on betting reduced from 8% to 7.75%
- Duty on beer increased by 1p
- Duty on wine increased by 5p a bottle
- Duty on spirits increased by 28p a litre
- Duty on a packet of 20 cigarettes increased by 13p

== Reaction ==
The budget was held a day before Prime Minister John Major called the 1992 general election, and that year's budget formed an important part of the Conservatives' election campaign. Opposition Labour Party leader Neil Kinnock dismissed the budget as "a panic-stricken pre-election sweetener", and Labour opposed the introduction of the 20p income tax rate during their campaign. This enabled the Conservatives to portray them as a high tax party, and ultimately led to the Conservative Party winning the election a few weeks later.

BBC News has noted that commentators were alarmed that PSBR had reached £28bn. The Guardian has noted that the City of London was "depressed" by the lack of any measures to tackle high interest rates.

== See also ==
- It's The Sun Wot Won It
