= 1980 United Kingdom budget =

- Presented: 26 March 1980
- Parliament: 48th
- Party: Conservative Party
- Chancellor: Geoffrey Howe

The 1980 United Kingdom budget was delivered by Geoffrey Howe, the Chancellor of the Exchequer, to the House of Commons on 26 March 1980. It was the second budget to be presented by Howe since his appointment as chancellor the previous year, and was noted for the number of leaks that appeared in the press before it was delivered. There were broad reductions in public spending, but increases in spending on policing and the military. Prescriptions were increased from 45p to £1, while benefits for striking workers were cut. Labour Party leader James Callaghan, the Leader of the Opposition, called it the most divisive budget since 1931.

== Background ==
A number of leaks to the press preceded the 1980 budget, suggesting the chancellor would announce some harsh measured, and broke the usual practice of Budget purdah, the period between the budget's preparation and delivery during which aspects of its content are not discussed.

== Overview ==
The chancellor described the measures announce in his budget as "inescapable". They included broad reductions in public spending, although spending was increased for the police and the military. The chancellor also announced he would abolish the 25% lower rate of income tax, raise prescription charges from 45p (Note: about £2 at 2021 prices) to £1 (Note: about £5 at 2021 prices), and make both unemployment benefit and sickness benefit taxable. Supplementary benefits paid to the families of striking workers were also cut by basing them on the assumption the person on strike was being paid £12 a week in sick pay, something that was not always the case. Excise duty on alcohol was also increased, with beer raised by 2p a pint, wine increased by 8p a bottle, and whisky increased by 50p a litre.

== Reaction ==
In his response to the statement, James Callaghan, the leader of the Labour Party and Leader of the Opposition, called the budget the "meanest since 1931".
