= 1990 United Kingdom budget =

- Presented: 20 March 1990
- Country: United Kingdom
- Parliament: 50th
- Party: Conservative Party
- Chancellor: John Major

The 1990 United Kingdom budget was delivered by John Major, the Chancellor of the Exchequer, to the House of Commons on 20 March 1990. It was the only budget to be delivered by Major during his tenure as Chancellor, and the twelfth and final budget to be presented by the Conservative government of Margaret Thatcher, who would resign as prime minister later that year. The 1990 budget also marked the first occasion on which a budget statement was televised, after cameras were allowed into the House of Commons in November 1989.

== Overview ==
With the United Kingdom entering challenging economic times, Major cautiously forecast economic growth of 1%, but did not significantly raise taxes and continued to rely on interest rates. Among the announcements made in the 1990 budget were the introduction of separate tax arrangements for husbands and wives, the introduction of tax-exempt special savings accounts (TESSAs), a tax-free savings scheme, and a raising of the investment ceiling for personal equity plans (PEPs) from £4,800 to £6,000. Major also confirmed that stamp duty on share deals would be abolished from 1992 to coincide with the introduction of "paperless" trading. A poll tax concessionary scheme was announced for those claiming Income Support that raised the amount of savings someone qualifying for the help could have to £16,000, but this was not backdated to include Scotland, which had introduced the poll tax in 1989. Other measures announced that year were a reduction of Pools betting tax from 42.5% to 40% with a condition that the money saved be used to improve crowd safety at football matches, and a rise in duty on beer, wines and spirits and cigarettes, with 2p on beer, 7p on wines, 54p on spirits, and 10p on a packet of 20 cigarettes.

== Reaction ==
The budget was generally received positively by Conservative MPs, who welcomed its cautious economic approach, but there was some criticism from the opposition Labour Party after the poll tax concession scheme was not backdated to include Scotland, and a number of Scottish MPs disrupted proceedings. Labour leader Neil Kinnock also congratulated Major for presenting an excellent maiden budget speech "even though there will be disagreements over a fairly extensive field with what he actually said".

== Broadcast ==
To coincide with the first televised budget speech, BBC Two ran a four-hour programme, Budget 90 Special, which included reaction and analysis from politicians and financial experts, as well as showing the budget speech itself, which lasted 64 minutes. Budget 90 Special was presented by David Dimbleby, while analysis was provided by Peter Snow. Early House of Commons footage was very limited in what could be shown, with only head-and-shoulders shots of the speaking MP or wide angled views of the chamber allowed. Onscreen graphics were added by the BBC to augment the speech, while that week's copy of the Radio Times had produced a checklist titled "What the budget means for you" which viewers could fill in at home as the speech was given.
