= 2008 United Kingdom budget =

2008 United Kingdom Budget
- Presented: 12 March 2008
- Country: United Kingdom
- Parliament: 54th
- Party: Labour
- Chancellor: Alistair Darling
- Total revenue: £575 billion^{‡}
- Total expenditures: £618 billion^{‡}
- Deficit: £43 billion^{‡}
- Website: Budget 2008
- ^{‡}Numbers are projections.

The 2008 United Kingdom Budget, officially known as Budget 2008: Stability and opportunity: building a strong, sustainable future, was formally delivered by Alistair Darling in the House of Commons on 12 March 2008. It was the first Budget to be delivered by Darling, who had been appointed Chancellor of the Exchequer the previous June.

Among the changes from the previous year were that taxes on alcohol, cigarettes and high-polluting cars would be increased. Child Benefit would be raised to £20 a week from April 2009; winter fuel payments for pensioners would also be increased. All long-term recipients of Incapacity Benefit would have to attend work capacity programmes from April 2010.

The growth of the national economy was expected to slow down to approximately 2% in 2008, down from 3% in the previous year.

== Details ==
=== Taxes ===
1. Income Tax (28.0%)
2. National Insurance (18.0%)
3. Value Added Tax (VAT) (15.0%)
4. Corporate Tax (9.00%)
5. Excise duties (7.00%)
6. Council Tax (4.00%)
7. Business rates (4.00%)
8. Other (15.0%)

Receipts	2008-09 Revenues (£bn)
Income Tax	160
National Insurance	105
Value Added Tax (VAT)	84
Corporate Tax	52
Excise duties	42
Council Tax	25
Business rates	24
Other	84
Total Government revenue	575

=== Spending ===
Department	2008-09 Expenditure (£bn)
Social protection	169
Health	111
Education	82
Debt interest	31
Defence	33
Public order and safety	33
Personal social services	27
Housing and Environment	23
Transport	21
Industry, agriculture and employment	22
Other	67
Total Government spending	618
