= 1991 United Kingdom budget =

- Presented: 19 March 1991
- Country: United Kingdom
- Parliament: 50th
- Party: Conservative Party
- Chancellor: Norman Lamont

The 1991 United Kingdom budget (officially titled A budget for business) was delivered by Norman Lamont, the chancellor of the exchequer, to the House of Commons on 19 March 1991. It was Lamont's inaugural budget following his appointment as chancellor by Prime Minister John Major, and the first to be presented following the resignation of Margaret Thatcher as prime minister the previous autumn.

With the prospect of the next general election needing to be held in little over a year's time, the governing Conservative Party was keen to distance itself from the unpopular legacy left behind by the Community Charge (more commonly known as the poll tax). One of the ways the new government had sought to do this was to offer a £140 discount on all poll tax bills under its Community Charge Reduction Scheme. But the chancellor increased VAT in order to pay for this, a move that some Conservative MPs feared would damage their reputation as a low tax party. Lamont also Levied tax on the private use of company mobile phones, which were treated as an employee benefit. Responding to the budget, John Smith, the Shadow Chancellor of the Exchequer, claimed it was irrelevant to the country's needs.

== Background ==
As the 1991 budget approached, Lamont was faced with the choice of keeping interest rates high in order to maintain the UK's commitment to the Exchange Rate Mechanism (ERM), or reducing them in order to offset the impact of the ongoing recession on the UK economy. At the same time, the Thatcher government's introduction of the poll tax, officially known as the Community Charge, the previous year had proven unpopular with voters. Following her resignation as prime minister in November 1990, and with the requirement of a general election in little over a year, the new government was keen to shift the focus away from the poll tax. The introduction of the Community Charge Reduction Scheme would see every poll tax bill reduced by £140, and was seen as key to achieving this.

== Overview ==
One of the key features of the 1991 budget was an increase in VAT from 15% to 17.5% in order to fund the Community Charge Reduction Scheme. The chancellor also raised a tax on the private use of company mobile phones, which were treated as an employee benefit, but removed the tax from profit related pay, which had previously been taxed at half the rate. There was a £1 increase in child benefit for the first child in a family to £9.25, while excise duty was raised on alcohol and cigarettes.

=== Key points ===
- VAT raised from 15% to 17.5% to pay for the Community Charge Reduction Scheme
- Profit related pay to be tax free
- Private use of company mobile phones to be taxed as employee benefit
- Child benefit increase by £1 to £9.25 for first child
- Duty on beer raised by 2p a pint
- Duty on wine raised by 9p a bottle
- Duty on spirits raised by 56p a litre
- Duty on 20 cigarettes raised by 16p

== Reaction ==
BBC News notes that commentators were surprised by the increase in VAT.

Neil Kinnock, leader of the Opposition Labour Party, described the 1991 budget as the "biggest climbdown in modern political history", while his Shadow Chancellor, John Smith, suggested the statement had little relevance to the needs of the country.
