= 2001 United Kingdom budget =

- Country: United Kingdom
- Parliament: 52nd
- Party: Labour
- Chancellor: Gordon Brown

The 2001 United Kingdom budget, named "Investing for the Long Term: Building Opportunity and Prosperity for All", was presented by Gordon Brown, Chancellor of the Exchequer, to the House of Commons March 2001. As of June 2020 it is the most recent year in UK history that the government reported a budgetary surplus.

== Reform of Betting Taxation ==
In the 2001 UK Budget, Chancellor Gordon Brown introduced significant reforms aimed at modernizing the taxation system for the betting industry, with a focus on promoting competitiveness and fairness. Central to these reforms was the replacement of the longstanding general betting duty with a gross profits tax system, scheduled to come into effect by 1st January 2002.

Under the new system, the existing duty of 6.75% on total stakes was supplanted by a 15% tax on bookmakers' gross profits. This shift was designed to eliminate taxation on punters directly, fostering accessibility and fairness within the industry. Moreover, by restructuring the tax burden to be borne by bookmakers, the reform aimed to empower them to absorb the tax and cease the 9% "deduction" previously charged on stakes.

The rationale behind this reform was to create an environment conducive to the growth of the British betting industry, both domestically and internationally. By leveraging the opportunities presented by e-commerce and the global betting market, the reform sought to position UK-based bookmakers at a competitive advantage.

One notable outcome of these changes was the decision by major UK bookmakers to relocate their offshore operations back to the UK. This relocation was driven by the attractiveness of the new duty system, coupled with the nation's reputation for bookmaking integrity, skilled workforce, and robust IT infrastructure. The repatriation of these operations promised to stimulate e-commerce businesses, create employment opportunities, and contribute to economic growth.

Furthermore, the reforms broadened the scope of the gross profits tax to include bets placed with brokers or agents holding bookmakers' permits, ensuring equitable treatment across the industry. While the on-course exemption for betting at racecourses and greyhound tracks was retained, discussions were initiated regarding the potential inclusion of betting at other sports venues within the new tax framework.

In summary, the 2001 Budget's reforms of betting taxation aimed to foster a competitive and fair environment for the British betting industry. By transitioning to a gross profits tax system and eliminating taxation on punters, the reforms sought to stimulate growth, enhance competitiveness, and safeguard government revenues in the long term.
