= 2006 United Kingdom budget =

2006 United Kingdom Budget
- Presented: 22 March 2006
- Country: United Kingdom
- Parliament: 54th
- Party: Labour
- Chancellor: Gordon Brown
- Total revenue: £516 billion^{‡}
- Total expenditures: £552 billion^{‡}
- Website: archived website
- ^{‡}Numbers in italics are projections.

The 2006 United Kingdom Budget, officially known as Budget 2006: A strong and strengthening economy: Investing in Britain's future was formally delivered by Chancellor of the Exchequer Gordon Brown in the House of Commons on 22 March 2006.

== Details ==
=== Taxes ===
Receipts	2006-07 Revenues (£bn)
Income Tax	144
National Insurance	90
Value Added Tax (VAT)	76
Corporate Tax	49
Excise duties	40
Council Tax	22
Business rates	21
Other	74
Total Government revenue	516

=== Spending ===
Department	2006-07 Expenditure (£bn)
Social protection	151
Health	96
Education	73
Debt interest	27
Defence	29
Public order and safety	32
Personal social services	26
Housing and Environment	19
Transport	21
Industry, agriculture and employment	21
Other	57
Total Government spending	552
