= 1999 United Kingdom budget =

1999 United Kingdom Budget
- Submitted: 9 March 1999
- Country: United Kingdom
- Parliament: 52nd
- Party: Labour
- Chancellor: Gordon Brown
- Total revenue: £349 billion^{‡}
- Total expenditures: £349 billion^{‡}
- Deficit: £0 billion^{‡}
- Website: Budget 1999
- ^{‡}Numbers are projections.

The 1999 United Kingdom Budget, officially known as Budget 99: Building a Stronger Economic Future for Britain was the formal government budget for the year 1999.

== Background ==
The budget took place during a period of continuing economic expansion, shortly after the launch of the Euro currency on 1 January 1999, and at the tail end of the dot-com bubble.

During 1998, net public sector debt stood at £361.2 billion, 35.6 per cent of GDP.

Interest rates had declined rapidly over the previous twelve months from a peak of 7.5 per cent in June 1998 to 5.5 per cent by February 1999, whilst inflation during 1998 was recorded at 1.6 per cent (CPI) and 3.4 per cent (RPI).

== Budget measures ==
A new starting rate of income tax at 10 per cent was to be introduced in April 1999. Basic rate income tax was to be reduced from 23 per cent to 22 per cent in April 2000. The budget also abolished the married couple's allowance for under-65s and MIRAS mortgage interest relief from April 2000. Child tax credit was to be introduced and employer national insurance contributions cut by 0.5 per cent from April 2001. Stamp duties on property were to be raised. A Climate Change Levy was scheduled for the 2001–02 fiscal year.

== Details ==
=== Tax Revenue ===
Receipts	1999–2000 Revenues (£bn)
Business rates	16
Corporation Tax	30
Council Tax	13
Excise Duties	36
Income Tax	88
NI	56
VAT	54
Other	56
Total Government revenue	349

=== Spending ===
Department	1999–2000 Expenditure (£bn)
Debt Interest	26
Defense	22
Education	41
Health	61
Housing & Environment	13
Industry, Agriculture, Employment	15
Law & Order	19
Other	41
Social Security	102
Transport	9
Total Government spending	349
