= 2003 United Kingdom budget =

2003 United Kingdom Budget
- Country: United Kingdom
- Parliament: 53rd
- Party: Labour
- Chancellor: Gordon Brown
- Total revenue: £423 billion^{‡}
- Total expenditures: £460 billion^{‡}
- Deficit: £37 billion^{‡}
- Website: Budget 2003
- ^{‡}Numbers are projections.

The 2003 United Kingdom Budget, officially known as Opportunity for all: The strength to take the long-term decisions for Britain was the formal government budget for the year 2003.

== Details ==
=== Tax Revenue ===
Receipts	2003-04 Revenues (£bn)
Business rates	19
Corporation Tax	29
Council Tax	18
Excise Duties	38
Income Tax	119
NI	73
VAT	69
Other	58
Total Government revenue	423

=== Spending ===
Department	2003-04 Expenditure (£bn)
Debt Interest	22
Defense	27
Education	59
Health	73
Housing & Environment	20
Industry, Agriculture, Employment	17
Law & Order	29
Other	46
Personal Social Services	17
Social Security	135
Transport	16
Total Government spending	461
