= 2000 United Kingdom budget =

2000 United Kingdom Budget
- Country: United Kingdom
- Parliament: 52nd
- Party: Labour
- Chancellor: Gordon Brown
- Total revenue: £371 billion^{‡}
- Total expenditures: £371 billion^{‡}
- Deficit: £0 billion^{‡}
- ^{‡}Numbers are projections.

The 2000 United Kingdom Budget, officially known as Budget 2000 – Prudent for a Purpose: Working for a Stronger and Fairer Britain was the formal government budget for the year 2000.

== Background ==
The millennium year witnessed Britain's major trading partners, particularly the US and several European economies, enter economic difficulties as part of the early 2000s recession. The dot-com bubble burst, though fallout in the United Kingdom was limited. During the autumn, fuel protests occurred due to rising petrol prices.

During 1999, net public sector debt stood at £364.4 billion, 34.3 per cent of GDP.

Interest rates showed greater stability in comparison to the previous year, rising from 5 per cent in June 1999 to 6 per cent in February 2000 where it remained for the rest of the year. Inflation abated further during 1999 which recorded 1.3 per cent (CPI) and 1.5 per cent (RPI).

== Budget measures ==
The basic rate of income tax was to be reduced from 23 per cent to 22 per cent from April 2000. The married couple's allowance for under-65s and MIRAS mortgage interest relief was to be abolished from April 2000. Fuel duty was to be frozen in real terms. Excise duties on cigarettes were to increase by 5 per cent above inflation. stamp duties were to be raised. Tax credits and Income Support were scheduled to be increased. Large increases in NHS spending were forecast. The Climate Change Levy was to be reduced before its introduction in April 2001, with the concomitant cut in employer National Insurance contributions instead limited to 0.3 per cent instead of 0.5 per cent.

== Details ==
=== Tax Revenue ===
Receipts	2000–2001 Revenues (£bn)
Business rates	16
Corporation Tax	34
Council Tax	14
Excise Duties	37
Income Tax	96
NI	59
VAT	60
Other	55
Total Government revenue	371

=== Spending ===
Department	2000–2001 Expenditure (£bn)
Debt Interest	28
Defense	23
Education	46
Health	54
Housing & Environment	14
Industry, Agriculture, Employment	15
Law & Order	20
Other	59
Social Security	103
Transport	9
Total Government spending	371
