= 2002 United Kingdom budget =

2002 United Kingdom Budget
- Country: United Kingdom
- Parliament: 53rd
- Party: Labour
- Chancellor: Gordon Brown
- Total revenue: £407 billion^{‡}
- Total expenditures: £418 billion^{‡}
- Deficit: £11 billion^{‡}
- Website: Budget 2002
- ^{‡}Numbers are projections.

The 2002 United Kingdom Budget, officially known as The strength to make long-term decisions: Investing in an enterprising, fairer Britain was the formal government budget for the year 2002.

The most significant policy implemented as part of this Budget was the 1% increase in National Insurance contributions for both employees and employers, the proceeds of which went towards an increase in NHS spending.

== Details ==
=== Tax Revenue ===
Receipts	2002-03 Revenues (£bn)
Business rates	19
Corporation Tax	33
Council Tax	16
Excise Duties	38
Income Tax	118
NI	65
VAT	64
Other	55
Total Government revenue	408

=== Spending ===
Department	2002-03 Expenditure (£bn)
Debt Interest	21
Defense	24
Education	54
Health	65
Housing & Environment	20
Industry, Agriculture, Employment	17
Law & Order	24
Other	49
Personal Social Services	15
Social Security	115
Transport	14
Total Government spending	418
