= 2004 United Kingdom budget =

2004 United Kingdom Budget
- Country: United Kingdom
- Parliament: 53rd
- Party: Labour
- Chancellor: Gordon Brown
- Total revenue: £451 billion^{‡}
- Total expenditures: £485 billion^{‡}
- Deficit: £34 billion^{‡}
- Website: Budget 2004
- ^{‡}Numbers are projections.

The 2004 United Kingdom Budget, officially known as Opportunity for all: The strength to take the long-term decisions for Britain was the formal government budget for the year 2004.

== Details ==
=== Tax Revenue ===
Receipts	2004-05 Revenues (£bn)
Business rates	19
Corporation Tax	33
Council Tax	20
Excise Duties	40
Income Tax	127
NI	78
VAT	74
Other	61
Total Government revenue	452

=== Spending ===
Department	2004-05 Expenditure (£bn)
Debt Interest	24
Defense	27
Education	64
Health	82
Housing & Environment	16
Industry, Agriculture, Employment	19
Law & Order	29
Other	44
Personal Social Services	22
Social Security	140
Transport	18
Total Government spending	485
