= 2005 United Kingdom budget =

2005 United Kingdom Budget
- Country: United Kingdom
- Parliament: 54th
- Party: Labour
- Chancellor: Gordon Brown
- Total revenue: £487 billion^{‡}
- Total expenditures: £519 billion^{‡}
- Deficit: £32 billion^{‡}
- Website: Budget 2005
- ^{‡}Numbers are projections.

The 2005 United Kingdom Budget, officially known as Investing for our future: Fairness and opportunity for Britain's hard-working families was the formal government budget for the year 2005.

== Details ==
=== Tax Revenue ===
Receipts	2005-06 Revenues (£bn)
Business rates	19
Corporation Tax	44
Council Tax	21
Excise Duties	41
Income Tax	138
NI	83
VAT	76
Other	65
Total Government revenue	487

=== Spending ===
Department	2005-06 Expenditure (£bn)
Debt Interest	26
Defence	28
Education	68
Health	90
Housing & Environment	16
Industry, Agriculture, Employment	20
Law & Order	31
Other	49
Personal Social Services	23
Social Security	146
Transport	20
Total Government spending	517
