= Happy List =

Annual list published by the Independent since 2008

The Happy List is a list of 50 people in the United Kingdom "who give back, volunteer, and who make Britain a better balanced, happier country." Previously featuring 100 people, the list was reduced in 2017 and featured 50 afterwards. It was published annually in April by the Independent on Sunday, a British national Sunday newspaper, between 2008 until 2022. No further lists have been published since 2022.

The BBC welcomed the first Happy List as "an antidote" to the Sunday Times Rich List, a longer-standing institution, which is published on the same day. Following widespread comment in the UK and abroad, the Independent announced a week later that it would make the Happy List an annual fixture. The Wall Street Journal floated the idea of a Happy List for the United States, but this was not taken up.

The newspaper accepts that the list is an artificial exercise, but seeks to celebrate people representing much-needed values, in the hope that they will be seen as role models.

== The first Happy List ==
The first list included Tim Berners-Lee, the inventor of the World Wide Web, cricketer and fundraiser Ian Botham, and author and philanthropist J. K. Rowling.

Notably, the first happy list also included the character Tinky Winky from Teletubbies, a popular British children's show.

The Wall Street Journal noted that the list included wealthy individuals such as Duncan Bannatyne, quoting his opinion that "Britain's rich don't do enough for good causes."

It also included ten less well-known people, who had featured in Gordon Brown's 2007 book, co-authored with Community Links, with a somewhat similar aim, Britain's Everyday Heroes.

== Selection criteria ==
The Happy List 2010 was published as a supplement in the Independent on Sunday on 25 April 2010. The selection reflected the newspaper's own research, nominations from the public, and recommendations from national organisations, including Heritage Lottery Fund, Barnardo's, Christian Aid, National Trust, Save the Children, NCVO and Amnesty International. The compilers took care to include some people working only at a local level, as representative examples of volunteers around the country.

They avoided repeating people from previous years' lists unless they had made an exceptional contribution in the preceding 12 months. Camila Batmanghelidjh was included in 2008 and 2009. Peter Kay made the list in 2009 as "simply Britain's best comedian", and again in 2010 for also raising funds for Children in Need.

As it would be invidious to attempt to rank the individuals, the lists are generally presented alphabetically. However, six exceptional individuals headed the 2010 list: Heather Brooke, who broke the MPs' expenses scandal; Brian Cox for making science "cool"; Kate Humble, wildlife enthusiast; playwright Kwame Kwei-Armah, bringing wider attention to Britain's black community; Jasvinder Sanghera, campaigner against forced marriage; and Archbishop John Sentamu, "thoughtful and provocative contributor to national debate".

The 100 in 2010 were not all adults, but include duos, a child, a Royal National Lifeboat Institution team and a few other organisations. The 2008 list included fictional character Tinky Winky, followed by Thomas the Tank Engine in 2009. The second list also included Simba, a therapy dog.
