= David Robinson (community worker) =

Sir David Neil Robinson OBE is the co-founder and co-leader of the Relationships Project.

Robinson co-founded east London charity Community Links in 1977 while at school, and was Chief Executive for 25 years. When he stepped down to become Senior Advisor, Community Links was the UK's largest local voluntary organisation.

He co-founded the Children’s Discovery Centre in 2002. It was the UK’s first Story Centre working with more than 100,000 children and their families every year on the development of literacy skills and a love of language and stories. From 2007 to 2010 he led the Prime Minister’s Council on Social Action for Gordon Brown. While there, he initiated and worked with others on the construction of the Social impact bond and went on to chair the successful Peterborough project – the world’s first scheme funded by a Social impact bond. The SIB was developed by Social Finance Ltd. where David became a director and later chaired the Impact Incubator developing new models in areas of acute social need.

Robinson founded and chaired Shift - the social enterprise developing products that change behaviour. It began with the million selling Change the world for a fiver series of books before moving on to a range of other products and projects.

He set up Changing London in 2013 to involve Londoners in an independent, three year programme developing ideas for London’s next mayor. After the mayoral election he advised on the Mayor's Citizenship and Integration programme. He established and led the National Early Action Task Force from 2011 to 2015. He has also chaired or been a non-executive director with many organisations including BASSAC (now Locality), Business in the Community, Social Finance Ltd. and the Big Society Trust.

David's books include Britain's Everyday Heroes (with Gordon Brown), 'Changing London' (with Will Horowitz), 'Change the World for a Fiver' and Unconditional Leadership as well as numerous papers and reports. Other publications include multiple policy reports for the Council on Social Action, for the Early Action Task Force and now an ongoing series for the Relationships Project.

David was the first Practitioner in Residence at the LSE’s Marshall Institute. He delivered the first Practitioners public lecture for the Institute at the LSE in 2018 and another in 2023. He is now an occasional lecturer at the LSE and elsewhere. David holds an honorary doctorate from the Open University, is an Ashoka Senior Fellow and chair of the Flying Seagulls. He was once described by the Guardian as “the godfather of the community sector, equally admired on the left and right”.

He was awarded OBE in 1995, has three children and lives in East London.
