= Not flash, just Gordon =

British Labour Party slogan in 2007

Campaign poster with Labour Party leader and prime minister Gordon Brown

Not flash, just Gordon was an advertising slogan and campaign used by the British Labour Party in September and October 2007. The campaign was created by advertising agency Saatchi & Saatchi in preparation for a speculated snap general election after Labour Party leader Gordon Brown succeeded Tony Blair as prime minister in June. The campaign intended to win over the electorate by implicitly comparing Brown with Blair, dissociating the former from the latter's demonstrative self-presentation, and also implicitly compared Brown with Conservative Party leader David Cameron. It made Brown's perceived awkward persona a strength and his perceived lack of charisma and limited communication skills a virtue. The campaign ended after Brown said he would not call a snap election on 6 October.

== Background ==
=== Political background ===
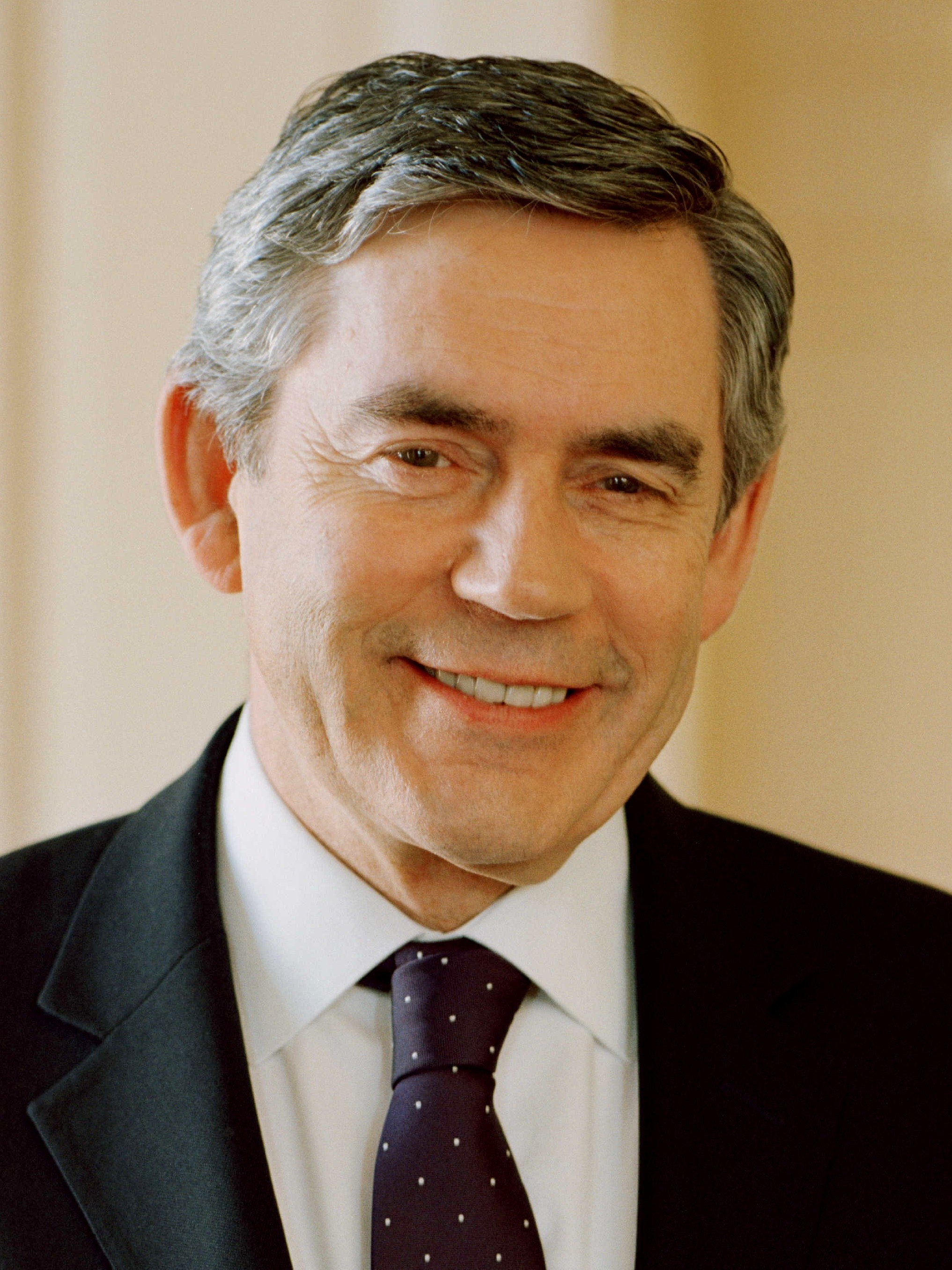
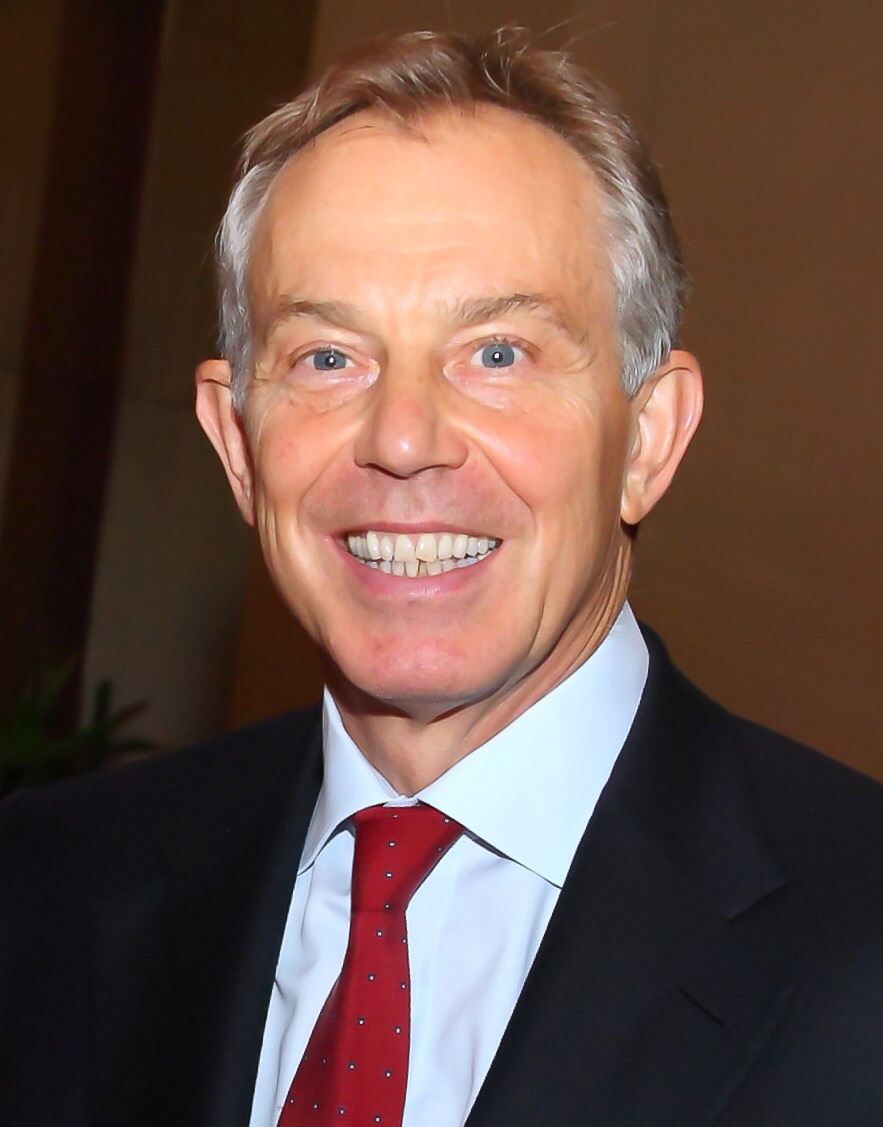
Brown (left) succeeded Tony Blair (right) as prime minister on 27 June 2007

Labour Party leader Gordon Brown became prime minister on 27 June 2007, succeeding previous party leader Tony Blair. He served as Chancellor of the Exchequer throughout Blair's premiership for ten years. Blair was known for his perceived charismatic personality, skilful rhetoric and communication, and usage of political spin. However, Brown was known for his perceived awkward persona. He pledged "a new era of spin-free politics" and made attempts to separate himself from Blair.

In Blair's final months in office, the official opposition party the Conservative Party had established an opinion poll lead. Its leader David Cameron was young and, like Blair, also viewed as charismatic. He was admired because of his perceived communication skills. In his first months as prime minister, Brown benefited from a polling bounce, with Labour taking the lead back from the Conservatives. Speculation grew that Brown would take advantage of his popularity and call a snap general election as early as autumn 2007 or sometime in 2008, and this speculation was encouraged by Brown's aides. In August, both major parties began searching for an advertising agency.

=== Saatchi & Saatchi ===
Saatchi & Saatchi was founded in 1970 by brothers Charles and Maurice Saatchi. In March 1978, the brothers were appointed by the Conservative Party to run its advertising campaign in the 1979 general election, leading to the creation of the "famous" Labour Isn't Working advertising campaign, which rose the brothers from obscurity to household names. Saatchi & Saatchi continued to work for the Conservatives in the 1983 and 1987 general elections; the Conservatives won all three elections. Margaret Thatcher, the Conservative leader at the time, considered Saatchi & Saatchi her favourite advertising agency. In 1994, the brothers were removed from the agency in a shareholder rebellion.

In 1995 the brothers set up a new agency, M&C Saatchi, where they continued to work for the Conservatives until 1999. A subsidiary of the new agency was recruited by the party and continued to work for them until 2006. Saatchi & Saatchi lost much of its market when the brothers left the original agency and it lost its prominent status in the advertising industry. Several Saatchi clients dropped the original agency and employed M&C Saatchi instead. The Conservatives dropped Saatchi & Saatchi in December 1995.

== Campaign ==
Competing against three other agencies, Saatchi & Saatchi presented fifty posters to the party, with a favourite being selected by party officers. Designed by the agency, this poster involved an image of Brown looking modest, thoughtful, and wearing a lightly creased suit beside the advertising slogan "Not flash, just Gordon". On 12 September 2007, because of the poster, Labour and Saatchi signed a contract worth several million pounds, and the agency was given control over the party's advertising for the next general election. This was announced on the party's website in a statement by Labour's general election co-ordinator Douglas Alexander, with the poster appearing above the announcement. By 16 September, an advertising campaign for the slogan had been launched by the agency, with the poster displayed on billboards and used in political adverts in preparation for a 2007 snap election.

At the Labour Party Conference held in late September, more posters for the slogan were unveiled. However, Labour's lead in the opinion polls decreased following the Conservative Party Conference in early October. On 5 October, an opinion poll held by the News of the World had the Conservatives with a six-point lead over Labour in 83 swing seats. On 6 October, Brown publicly said he would not call a snap election in autumn. The next election would not have to be called until 2010. The slogan was subsequently disused and the posters for it were taken down.

In 2017, an article in the Prospect magazine revealed that Saatchi had drafted other campaign posters for the Labour Party, which were then shown to focus groups of swing voters in August 2007. These compared Brown with Conservative leader David Cameron, with the best received posters displaying a "Brown strength" and a "Cameron weakness", but these were not shown to the general public.

== Analysis ==
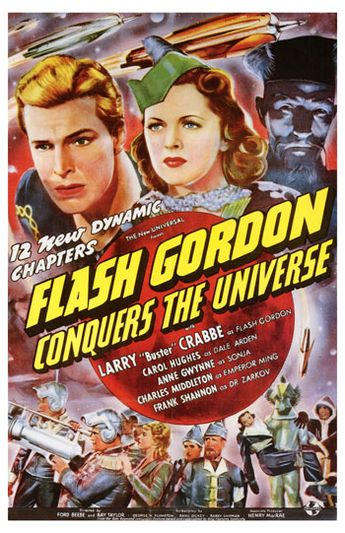
The slogan was interpreted as a reference to comic strip protagonist Flash Gordon

Saatchi & Saatchi created the slogan in preparation for a possible snap election, using it to make Brown's serious personality attractive to voters. The initial poster was the first Labour Party poster published following the Blair–Brown handover. The campaign was used by the party to win over the electorate by implicitly comparing Brown with Blair, disassociating him from Blair's demonstrative self-presentation. It put forward Brown's serious-minded approach to working in the role of prime minister, as opposed to Blair who was viewed as having worked in the role superficially. It made a virtue of Brown's perceived lack of charisma, a trait that was central to Blair's political persona, and also depicted him as truthful instead of spinful. Blair was known for his dependence on political spin as prime minister, and Brown wanted to distance himself from this dependency through the slogan. The Labour Party advertised his lack of spin as an "antidote" against the Blair era.

The slogan also implicitly compared Brown with Conservative leader David Cameron, who shared Blair's perceived superficiality. Cameron was admired because of his perceived communication skills whereas Brown was viewed as having limited communication skills, so the advertising campaign was used by the Labour Party to make this trait seem virtuous. The slogan was also used to make Brown's perceived awkward persona seem like a strength, not a weakness. Other traits that the advert intended to convey about Brown were conviction and solidity. David Stringer of NBC News said the slogan "[sought] to define [Brown] as serious and statesmanlike".

In an article for The Independent, the Campaign's Claire Beale said: "If the 'not flash' line is anything to go by, Labour's approach will be to ditch the hyperbole and focus on Brown's integrity. By implication, being 'not flash' distances Brown from the Blair era and paves the way for a rebranding of the party." Writing about Saatchi & Saatchi's employment by Labour, Andy McSmith of The Independent and Andrew Pierce of The Daily Telegraph said it was "another break" with the Blair era of the Labour Party. Trevor Beattie's advertising agency Beattie McGuinness Bungay worked for Blair in the 1997, 2001 and 2005 general elections and unsuccessfully competed with Saatchi for the contract.

The phrase was also interpreted as a reference to comic strip protagonist Flash Gordon. Philip Gould, who worked on the campaign, claimed that the slogan was a word play on the character in his 2011 book The Unfinished Revolution: How New Labour Changed British Politics Forever. Brown dismissed comparisons with the character when he was prime minister, saying he was "Just Gordon, I can assure you".

== Reception ==
The employment of Saatchi & Saatchi by the Labour Party surprised the advertising industry. The Campaign's Claire Beale said the original poster was "a great start" for any attempts by Saatchi to regain its 1980s prominence. The Independent's Andy McSmith echoed her opinion, saying that the poster gave Saatchi "the prospect of recapturing some of its former prominence". The slogan itself saw some success before its disuse. Brown liked the slogan. In his 2017 autobiography My Life, Our Times, he approved of the campaign.

The initial poster was well received by swing voters. Although only implied, voters found its comparison of Brown with Blair and Cameron clear. The poster took advantage of the voters' positive views of Brown in his first months as prime minister, with his awkward traits making them believe that he was truthful and straightforward, and that he did not use spin.

The campaign was perceived by Labour Party supporters and opposition parties as a skilled attempt at forming a political image for Brown while remaining in the limits of his actual personality. In response to the campaign, the Conservatives launched their own advertising campaign with posters asking "Who gets a say on the European Constitution? Not you, just Gordon", in reference to Labour's refusal to call a referendum for the ratification of the Treaty of Lisbon, which affected the constitutional foundations of the European Union.
