= The Change We Choose =

2010 book by Gordon Brown

The Change We Choose: Speeches 2007–2009
- Author: Gordon Brown
- Language: English
- Subject: Politics
- Genre: Non-fiction
- Publisher: Mainstream Publishing
- Publication date: 1 April 2010
- Publication place: United Kingdom
- Pages: 300
- ISBN: 978-1-84596-632-4
- Preceded by: Britain's Everyday Heroes
- Followed by: Beyond the Crash

The Change We Choose: Speeches 2007–2009 is a book of speeches by Gordon Brown.

It was published by Mainstream Publishing on 1 April 2010, about a month before Brown resigned as Prime Minister of the United Kingdom.

In August 2010, the conservative Daily Telegraph newspaper reported that the book had been a commercial failure, selling only thirty-two copies. According to the Handelsblatt, the book was already sold heavily discounted at that time.
