= Creative Support =

UK mental health charity

- Formerly: Manchester Housing Consortium
- Founded: 1 January 1990; 35 years ago
- Headquarters: Stockport, England
- Key people: Anna Lunts, Beth Kennedy
- Services: supported housing, community services
- Website: https://www.creativesupport.co.uk/

Creative Support is a Manchester-based charity in England which works with adults with learning difficulties and mental health issues providing supported housing and community services.

== History ==
It was established in 1990 and registered in 1991 as an industrial and provident society with charitable status. It was then called Manchester Housing Consortium. It is a registered social landlord and became a community benefit society with charitable status under the Co-operative and Community Benefit Societies Act 2014. Chief executive Anna Lunts, a mental health nurse who had been involved in the closure of a long-stay psychiatric hospital, was the first employee. For the first five years resettling former patients of mental health hospitals was the main work of the organisation.

A head office was opened in Manchester city centre in 1996 and moved to Stockport in 2017. The organisation has since expanded both geographically and in the scope of its services. It merged with the charity SPACE, based in Preston, Lancashire, who provided sensory experiences for children and adults with a range of needs in 2013. In February 2014 it acquired Delos Community Limited which provided services to people with a learning disability and other needs in Northamptonshire.

The organisation regularly participates in the Manchester Pride march.

== Services ==
In 2021 it provided support to about 8000 people across England with learning disabilities, autism, mental health needs, physical disabilities and older people, including people living with dementia; and employs approximately 6600 staff. It provides care to individuals in 95 separate CQC registered services, most of which have been rated "Good". In 2020, it had an additional 1400 tenants in supported housing.

It runs:

- a mental health recovery service called Ignite in Sutton Coldfield. This is part of its Birmingham Hub and Spoke Services.
- Elkin Court, a residential home in Partington, rated 'inadequate' by the Care Quality Commission in 2015.
- a Community Links team in Bradford
- Support for people with learning disabilities in Lancashire, which it took over in 2007.
- supported living accommodation in West Berkshire
- care and support for 10 adults with physical or learning disabilities and people with mental health problems in Warrington

It is one of four private companies delivering adult social care in Salford, where Paul Dennett had proposed that an "insourcing commission" would be established to take adult social care back into local authority control.

== See also ==
- Mental health in the United Kingdom
