= Mainstream Publishing =

Scottish publishing house (1978–2013)

- Parent company: Random House
- Founded: 1978
- Defunct: 2013
- Country of origin: Scotland, UK
- Headquarters location: Edinburgh
- Distribution: The Book Service
- Publication types: Books

Mainstream Publishing was a publishing company in Edinburgh, Scotland. Founded in 1978, it ceased trading in December 2013. It was associated with the Random House Group, who bought Mainstream in 2005.

== Notable publications ==
Its publications include Magnus Magnusson's Fakers, Forgers and Phoneys (2005), Trevor White's Kitchen Con: Writing on the Restaurant Racket (2006), Gordon Haskell's autobiography The Road to Harry's Bar: Forty Years on the Potholed Path to Stardom (2006), Gordon Brown's Britain's Everyday Heroes (2007), Henry Allingham's Kitchener's Last Volunteer (2008) (with Denis Goodwin), and Mukesh Kapila's Against a Tide of Evil (2013).
