= Snap elections in the United Kingdom =

Type of parliamentary election

Snap elections in the United Kingdom are parliamentary elections held earlier than the latest date permitted for a Parliament's term, usually at the initiative of the Prime Minister, although some have resulted from votes of no confidence or specific Acts of Parliament.

The prime minister of the United Kingdom has the de facto power to call an election at will by requesting a dissolution from the monarch; the limited circumstances where this would not be granted are set out in the Lascelles Principles. If this does not happen, parliament dissolves automatically after five years, but this never happens; so in effect, most elections since the length of parliament was first limited in 1694, except the one in 2015 (the date for which was fixed by law), have technically been snap elections. The term is thus normally reserved in the British context for elections called significantly earlier than required (after five years since 1911, or after seven years prior to that).

== Fixed-term Parliaments Act ==
From 2011 to 2022, the conditions for when a snap election could be called were significantly restricted by the Fixed-term Parliaments Act 2011 (FTPA) to occasions when the government loses a confidence motion or when a two-thirds supermajority of MPs vote in favour. During autumn 2019 there were three attempts to trigger an election through the FTPA's provision for a two-thirds majority: all failed. Then the FTPA was bypassed entirely by Parliament enacting the Early Parliamentary General Election Act 2019 stipulating a set date for the next election: the 2019 general election. This required only a simple majority, because of the doctrine of parliamentary supremacy: Parliament cannot pass a law that cannot be changed or reversed by a future Parliament. The Fixed-term Parliaments Act was repealed on March 24, 2022 by the Dissolution and Calling of Parliament Act 2022, which restored the Monarch's power to dissolve parliament on request by the Prime Minister. This is thought to have revived the Lascelles Principles as well.

== History ==
The following elections were called by a voluntary decision of the government less than four years after the previous election:

- 1923 general election: Although the Conservative Party had won a working majority in the House of Commons after Bonar Law's victory in the 1922 general election, Stanley Baldwin called an election only a year later. Baldwin sought a mandate to raise tariffs, which Law had promised against in the previous election, as well as desiring to gain a personal mandate to govern and strengthen his position within the party. This backfired, as the election resulted in a hung parliament. Following losing a confidence motion in January 1924, Baldwin resigned and was replaced by Ramsay MacDonald, who formed the country's first ever Labour minority government with tacit support from the Liberal Party.
- 1931 general election: Following his government split over how to deal with the Great Depression, Ramsay MacDonald offered his resignation to the King in August 1931. He was instead persuaded to form a National Government with the Conservatives and Liberals, which resulted in his expulsion from the Labour Party. The Cabinet then decided to call the election to obtain a Doctor's Mandate to fix the economy. The result was that the National Government won the biggest landslide in British history. Labour, which was blamed for running away from responsibility as a Government in the nation's hour of need, was reduced to just 52 seats and its leader, Arthur Henderson, lost his seat.
- 1951 general election: Despite the fact the Conservatives were leading in the polls, Clement Attlee called the election to increase his government's majority, which had been reduced to just five seats in the previous general election. The Labour Party was defeated and Winston Churchill returned to power with a majority of 17.
- 1955 general election: After Winston Churchill retired in April 1955, Anthony Eden took over and immediately called the election in order to gain a mandate for his government.
- 1966 general election: Harold Wilson called the election seventeen months after Labour narrowly won the 1964 general election: The government had won a barely-workable majority of four seats, which had been reduced to two following the Leyton by-election in January 1965. Labour won a decisive victory, with a majority of 98 seats.
- February 1974 general election: Prime Minister Edward Heath called the election in order to get a mandate to face down a miners' strike. The election unexpectedly produced a hung parliament in which Labour narrowly won more seats, despite winning fewer votes than the Conservatives. Unable to form a coalition with the Liberals, Heath resigned and was replaced by Wilson.
- October 1974 general election: Six months following the February election, Wilson called another general election in an attempt to win a majority for his Labour minority government and resolve the deadlock. Wilson was successful, though Labour only held a narrow 3-seat majority.

Gordon Brown came very close to calling a snap election in the autumn of 2007; after he failed to do this, his popularity and authority greatly declined and he lost power in 2010.

The following elections were forced by a motion of no confidence against the will of the government:

- 1924 general election: Ramsay MacDonald was forced to call the election after a successful vote of no confidence as a result of the Campbell Case. It was the third general election in three years. The result was a landslide victory for Baldwin and the Conservatives.
- 1979 general election: This election was held six months before the latest possible date. It was called when the minority Labour government of James Callaghan lost a confidence motion, which had been proposed by the SNP in the aftermath of the Scottish devolution referendum and was taken forward by the Conservatives, by one vote. The Conservatives, led by Margaret Thatcher, won a majority of seats at the election.

The following two elections were called by the will of Parliament while the Fixed-term Parliaments Act 2011 was in force:

- 2017 general election: In April 2017, Prime Minister Theresa May tabled a motion in the House of Commons for an early general election in the form detailed in section 2(2) of the 2011 Act, which was approved in Parliament by a near-unanimous vote. This was shortly after the official commencement of the process of withdrawing from the European Union (Brexit), with May saying that she needed a clear mandate to lead the country through the ensuing negotiations, and hoping to increase her Conservative Party's majority. The election was a failure for May, with the Conservative Party losing seats, resulting in a hung parliament and a minority Conservative government with a confidence and supply agreement with the Democratic Unionist Party.
- 2019 general election: In September and October 2019, Prime Minister Boris Johnson, seeking a mandate and a majority to break the parliamentary deadlock on his Brexit deal, failed on several occasions to pass a section 2(2) motion for an early general election due to its requirement for a two-thirds majority. After failing to force the deal through with minimal scrutiny via a long prorogation that was ruled unlawful, he introduced a bill to bypass the 2011 Act, requiring only a simple majority in both houses. The bill passed and the Conservatives gained an 80-seat majority in the subsequent election, allowing the United Kingdom to leave the European Union the following January.

== Devolved governments ==
The devolved UK administrations (the Northern Ireland Assembly, Scottish Parliament, and the Senedd; established in 1998, 1999, and 1998 respectively) are also elected for fixed terms of government (four years prior to 2011, five years thereafter), but snap elections can still be called in the event of a motion of no confidence, or other special circumstances.

- 2017 Northern Ireland Assembly election: Held ten months after the previous Assembly election. Following the resignation of Sinn Féin deputy First Minister Martin McGuinness over various issues and scandals with his party's DUP coalition partners, and the subsequent refusal of Sinn Féin to nominate a new deputy First Minister, the Northern Ireland Executive collapsed and the Secretary of State for Northern Ireland James Brokenshire was legally obliged to call a snap election to attempt to restore a functional devolved government. This election took place on 2 March 2017. The DUP and Sinn Féin remained the two largest parties following the election, but did not reach an agreement to share power until January 2020.
