= Beyond the Crash =

2010 book by Gordon Brown

- Author: Gordon Brown
- Language: English
- Subject: Global economics
- Genre: Non-fiction
- Publisher: Simon & Schuster
- Publication date: December 2010
- Publication place: United Kingdom
- Media type: Hardback
- Pages: 315
- ISBN: 978-0-85720-285-7
- Preceded by: The Change We Choose

Beyond the Crash: Overcoming the first crisis of globalisation is a 2010 book by Gordon Brown, who served as the prime minister of the United Kingdom from 2007 until 2010. The work argues that the only way to overcome the 2008 financial crisis fully is with further coordinated global action. Brown states that a shared "global compact" on jobs and growth should be central to effective action, with different regions called on in different ways to contribute to rebalancing the global economy while boosting growth. The book includes first-hand accounts of events leading to previous successful cases of international collaboration on economic affairs. There are specific suggestions about the different ways in which the world's nations and regions can help secure global growth, jobs and poverty reduction. A secondary theme of the work is that better global oversight is needed for the international financial system. Brown suggests that to function at their best, banks and markets need shared morals.

Brown started writing the book at the end of May 2010, not long after the general election that ended with the defeat of his government. He completed it 14 weeks later while still attending to his work as a Member of Parliament.

== Synopsis ==
The book is divided into four parts and a total of eleven chapters, with a Prologue, an Introduction and a Conclusion.

=== Prologue ===
The Prologue relates how Brown decided to go ahead with his ground breaking recapitalisation plan for British banks during a transatlantic plane flight on 26 September 2008.

=== Introduction ===
The introduction takes the story in the prologue two weeks forward to 8 October, the day when the bank recapitalisation plan was announced. Brown describes how the crises evolved to become much wider than a banking crises—it became what he calls the first crises of globalisation, which if not overcome will threaten a decade or more of low growth, with millions left jobless and millions more in poverty. Brown recalls that in the last years of the 20th century, Europe and the United States had between them a majority share of the world's production, exports and investment. After 2000, Europe and America had minority shares in all those areas, while still retaining a large majority of the world's consumption, financed by borrowing from the rest of the world. Brown states that this recently developed situation has become unsustainable. He says it's essential for emerging economic giants like China to boost their consumption further if global growth is to be optimised and the crises is to be fully overcome. The introduction also discusses the need for morality to inform the conduct of market participants.

=== Part 1 ===
Part 1 has only one chapter, which tracks the UK government's response to the crises starting from the Sept 2007 bank run on Northern Rock and ending on 13 October 2008 after Brown's bank recapitalisation plan had been announced. In contrast to the global focus found in the rest of the book, the focus here is largely on Britain and Northern Rock (who issued false figures for mortgage arrears - p24), with some attention to cooperation and dialogue with the US and Europe, especially to Brown's work in persuading them of the need to recapitalise their own banks fearing the threat of a recession (p27). There is a brief mention of Brown's push to gain consensus for a G20 "heads of state" summit.

=== Part 2 ===
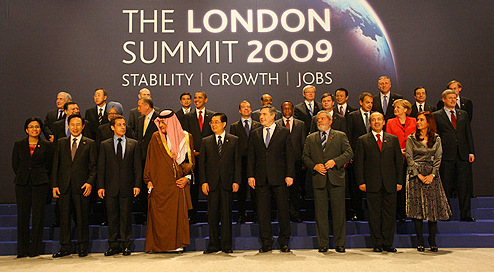
The 2009 G-20 London Summit. Brown asserts that measures agreed at this meeting were instrumental in preventing the global crisis from escalating into a global depression.

==== Chapter 2 ====
Chapter 2 is about the 1997 Asian financial crisis. Brown relates lessons from the earlier crisis, such as how the successful response by the Hong Kong authorities to the double play speculative attack showed that well executed government intervention can sometimes prevail over hostile markets. He diagnoses that the international community's inadequate response to the 1997 crisis is one of the reasons for the current crises, as it prompted emerging nations to focus excessively on building up foreign reserves, thus contributing to global imbalances.

==== Chapter 3 ====
Chapter 3 is about the current crisis, especially its relation to the banking sector. Brown asserts that the problems in banking sector was excessive and poorly understood risk taking, coupled with inadequate capital. He refers to "industrial scale moneymaking" (p84) and describes the actions of Lehman Brothers in particular as "unethical financial practices that were, right up to boardroom level, connived at, condoned and rewarded." (p95). He describes as "a stunning act of intellectual honesty" the acknowledgement by Alan Greenspan of "a fundamental flaw in the edifice of market economics" (p90). He goes on to note that the scale of the UK emergency bail-out was 10% of the salaries the bankers paid themselves from 2000 to 2007 (p106) and argued for a global financial levy in return for the "risks the public takes" and the "implicit support banks enjoy from the government" (p106).

==== Chapter 4 ====
Chapter 4 is about the 2009 G20 London summit and the back room diplomacy that was necessary to achieve consensus for the coordinated action unveiled at that meeting. Brown discusses the role of his team in setting the stage to ensure a successful outcome. He also acknowledges the important contributions made by various other international leaders including Nicolas Sarkozy, the president of France; Barack Obama, the president of the United States; and Manmohan Singh, the prime minister of India.

=== Part 3 ===
==== Chapter 5 ====
Chapter 5 is a forward looking review of the challenges to be faced after 2010 in delivery global growth and reducing worldwide unemployment. Brown says that all nations and regions will need to act concertedly if Global trade imbalances are to be reduced and the crisis is to be fully overcome. He notes that further policies to boost domestic demand in countries with current account surpluses like China will be essential but not sufficient—regions like Africa need to be helped so they can become new engines of global growth—and the US and Europe need to ensure their deficit reduction plans are combined with growth friendly policies. Brown discusses an International Monetary Fund report, which suggested that effective global cooperation in the years leading up to 2014 could reduce global unemployment by as much as 50 million and help lift an additional 90 million people out of poverty.

==== Chapter 6 ====
Chapter 6 contains analysis on the United States. Brown sketches the specific challenges facing the US including their high level of net debt and on-going current account deficit. He says America also has exceptional qualities which can help them overcome their problems if marshalled wisely. Brown concludes the US economy needs to become more export orientated and that the government needs to ensure adequate levels of investment, which are unlikely to be delivered by the private sector alone.

==== Chapter 7 ====
Chapter 7 is about the opportunity available to China. Brown advises that with increased switching from policies favouring exports to those aimed at boosting domestic demand, China can contribute to reducing global imbalances, while at the same time sustaining her own high growth and further reducing domestic poverty. Brown acknowledges that China has now been moving in this direction for several years, but says that further progress will help both China and the wider world.

==== Chapter 8 ====
Chapter 8 covers India, the rest of Asia, Russia and Latin America. Brown praises India as a country that has achieved high growth without worsening global imbalances, which she had done by not running either a large current account surplus or deficit. He notes however that internally India's growth has been uneven and that further policies aimed at reducing poverty and inequality in the lagging regions will be important for achieving sustained growth.

==== Chapter 9 ====
Chapter 9 focuses on Europe and the specific challenges relating to the Eurozone currency union. Brown says it's important for deficit reduction plans to be combined with growth friendly policy and that greater fiscal co-operation and flexibility will be needed to keep the Eurozone together.

==== Chapter 10 ====
Chapter 10 is about Africa, which Brown says was much harder hit by the crises than was Asia or Latin America. Brown says the continent has enormous potential and can become a new engine of growth for the whole world. He advises that help from G20 countries will be needed, both to boost investment in infrastructure and to make sure African countries have access to the markets of developed nations to help boost trade.

==== Chapter 11 ====
Chapter 11 sums up Brown's thoughts on the need for coordinated global action to reduce unemployment and poverty while boosting growth. He says that different regions are called on to act in different ways, but if nations work collaboratively it will help them better achieve both their individual domestic goals and to boost global growth as a whole. He argues that monetary policy and keeping deficits low "will not be sufficient to keep unemployment down" and that deficit reduction will be "linked to the speed of economic recovery" (pp 225–6). He points out that it is not possible for every country to solve the global problem by exporting (p229) and that prosperity, to be sustained, has to be shared (p231).

=== Part 4 ===
Part 4 contains just a Conclusion and an Appendix. The Appendix relates a speech Brown made in 1998, after the 1997 Asian financial crisis, discussing the need for enhanced global cooperation on economic issues. The Conclusion reiterates Brown's themes. Brown recaps on the need for the decision making of market participants to be informed by ethical concerns and not purely by the profit motive. Brown also stresses the need for global cooperation to achieve poverty reduction, a fair distribution of resources and lower unemployment—goals which Brown says reflects the values held by the world citizens.

== Reception ==
In a positive review, economist Joseph Stiglitz argues that Brown's position is correct on all counts. Stiglitz notes that the book is focussed firmly on global policies and issues—in contrast to other political memoirs it contains no political gossip. Stiglitz says that without dwelling on the past, Brown tries to highlight the lessons previous events have for us. Lord Skidelsky contends that Brown was the right man in the right place when it came to responding to the crisis, noting that efforts to coordinate economic recovery collapsed once Brown left the international stage. Skidelsky identifies two major acts of global leadership, the recapitalisation of banks and the coordination of fiscal and monetary stimulus, especially the one trillion dollar package announced at the London G-20 Summit. Skidelsky relates how the World Bank's president Robert Zoellick said the package "broke the fall" of the world economy. While mostly in agreement with Brown, Skidelsky writes that his successes in 2008 and 2009 have made Brown overly optimistic about what can be achieved at global summits, and that the road to achieving a "global compact" for jobs and poverty reduction will be rocky, if it can be travelled at all. Samuel Brittan in The Financial Times opines that Brown's message on the continual need for aggregate demand to be maintained very much needs to be heard, especially by European politicians who may be overly influenced by deficit cutting fiscal fundamentalism.

In a mostly positive review for The Guardian, David Lipsey largely agrees with Brown's themes and rebuts some of the criticism against him. But Lipsey suggests Brown does deserve some of the criticism from the left, who argue he did too little to punish bankers for the crisis and allowed too many of the consequences to fall on ordinary people. Tracey Boles for the Sunday Express focuses mainly on the book itself rather than the macroeconomic issues, saying that the work contains "fascinating insights" into the working of global governments as well as a few engaging incidents that shed light on Brown's home life. She says it would have been better if Brown had spent more time relating how he felt rather than discussing economic theory. Boles concludes by saying that Brown did help limit the global crisis but also that he was partly responsible for the conditions that caused it.

In a mostly critical review, Peter Oborne of The Daily Telegraph commented that "most fair-minded observers would concede that Brown's reaction to the events that followed the collapse of Lehman Brothers was his finest hour" and goes on to praise Brown's global leadership in this period. He suggests though that Brown was wrong to claim the London G20 had saved the world from a global depression, saying the effect of the package agreed at that summit were "marginal and transitory." Oborne criticises Brown's "pathetic" handling of his economic mistakes made during the 11 years leading up to the crisis. He also criticises the way Brown seems to praise his colleagues according to whether or not he likes them. Oborne says the book is a difficult read: jargon-laden, repetitive and marred by overly long sentences. He ends by saying that there is something moving about the book, that despite the poor writing and self-delusion, Brown's moral integrity and genuine desire to do good shine through. Reviews by John Gray for New Statesman and by The Economist magazine also criticise Brown for not recognising his own culpability during the years leading up to the crises. Gray argues that Brown had largely accepted neoliberal economic thinking, leading to his advocacy of light touch regulation for the City. The Economist's review also notes that while Brown stresses the Market's needs for morals, he doesn't give any practical suggestions on how morality could be encouraged in the financial sector.
