= Starting rate of UK income tax =

Obsolete UK tax band from the Brown chancellorship

The starting rate of income tax, known as the 10p rate (also referred to as 10p tax band), was a special rate of personal income taxation in the United Kingdom that existed from 1999 to 2008.

== Description ==
The 10p rate was the lowest rate of income tax in the United Kingdom. It meant that certain incomes above the personal allowance would be taxed at a basic rate of 10%, which meant a reduced rate compared with the previous basic UK income tax rate of 23%.

== History ==
=== Introduction ===
The reduced tax rate for low incomes was introduced in Gordon Brown's third budget as Chancellor of the Exchequer. Brown said of its introduction:

"The 10p rate is very important because it's a signal about the importance we attach about getting people into work and it's of most importance to the low paid. This is not about gimmicks; this is about tax reform that encourages work and families, on the families side it is replacing what was an anomalous married couples' allowance and replace it with a child tax credit."

=== Development ===
At the time of its introduction in 1999, the reduced tax rate of 10% applied to incomes between £4,335 and £5,835 (equivalent to £9,489 to £12,772 in 2023) and was the only income tax paid by 1.8 million of the lowest earners. By early 2008, the 10% tax rate had been raised to apply to income between £5,225 and £7,455.

=== Abolition ===
As part of his plans for the national budget for 2008 (his last as Chancellor of the Exchequer), Gordon Brown announced in 2007 that the reduced tax rate for low incomes would be abolished from April 2008. This meant that all income above the personal allowance and below the higher rate band would be taxed at 20%, with the effect that taxpayers earning above the personal allowance would be up to £232 worse off each year.

The abolition of the 10% tax band came into effect at the start of the 2008 tax year and was the source of considerable criticism. High-profile figures protested, including former minister Frank Field. In May 2008, the Chancellor of the Exchequer announced that the 2008–09 personal allowance would be increased by £600 (from £5435 to £6035) to help low-income tax-payers affected by the abolition of the 10% starting rate of income tax. At the same time, the threshold for higher rate income tax was reduced by £600, so that higher rate tax payers would not benefit from the adaptation. These changes were implemented in September 2008.

==== Subsequent adaptations to personal allowance ====
In the years after the abolition of the reduced tax rate for low incomes, the UK government made further adaptations to personal income taxation, notably to the personal allowance.

== Notes ==
- UK Government website: https://www.direct.gov.uk/en/MoneyTaxAndBenefits/Taxes/BeginnersGuideToTax/IncomeTax/Taxallowancesandreliefs/DG_078571
- Detailed list of rates paid between 1972 – 2005: http://www.taxhistory.co.uk/Income%20Tax%20Allowances.htm
