= Mukesh Kapila =

Humanitarian leader and author (born 1955)

Mukesh Kapila M.D. CBE
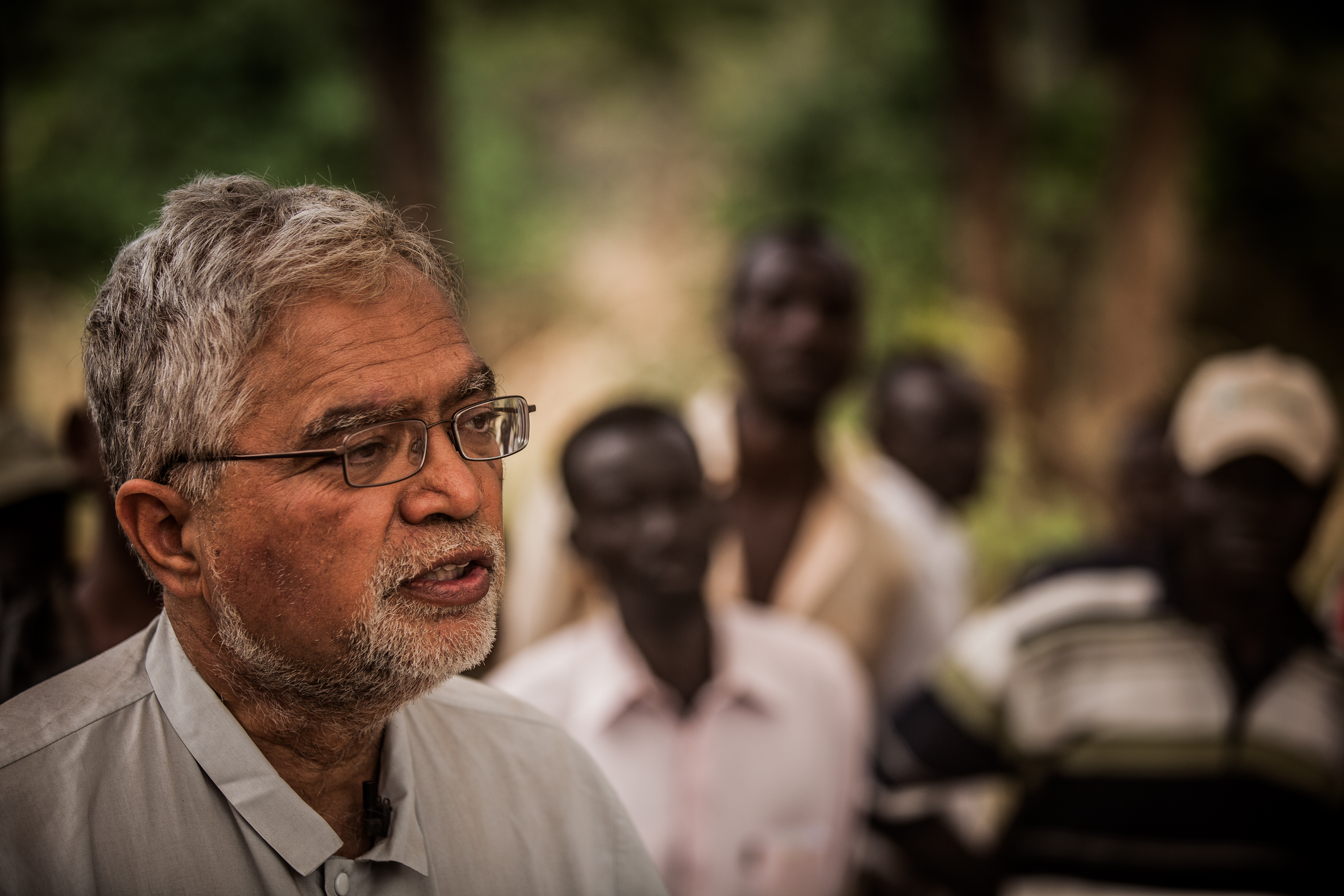
- Born: 1955 (age 70–71); India
- Citizenship: British
- Education: Oxford University (M.D.); London School of Hygiene and Tropical Medicine (post-grad)
- Notable work: Against a Tide of Evil (2013 memoir)
- Website: www.mukeshkapila.org

Mukesh Kapila M.D. CBE (born 1955) is an author, medical doctor, professor, and a senior humanitarian.

He is a specialist in crisis and conflict management, humanitarian affairs, post-conflict and development, and HIV/AIDS. He has worked for the UK National Health Service, the British government and the United Nations (UN). He witnessed genocides in Rwanda, Bosnia-Hercegovina and Darfur, the latter while being the head of the United Nations in Sudan. He was unceremoniously fired, after becoming a whistleblower regarding UN inaction in Darfur.

Kapila is the author of two books about genocide: Against a Tide of Evil (2013) and I am a stranger to kindness (2019). He currently works as a professor of global health and humanitarian affairs at the University of Manchester, and is a Special Representative of the Aegis Trust for the prevention of crimes against humanity.

== Early life and education ==
Kapila was born in India in 1955.

He has a degree in medicine from Oxford University and post graduate public health qualifications from the London School of Hygiene and Tropical Medicine.

== Career ==
He is a British medical professional and professor of Global Health and Humanitarian Affairs at the University of Manchester. He is a specialist in crisis and conflict management, humanitarian affairs, post-conflict and development, and HIV and AIDS. Kapila is also Special Representative for the Aegis Trust for the prevention of crimes against humanity.

As a mid-level civil servant in 1994, he was part of one of the first British teams to see the aftermath of the Rwandan genocide after entering Rwandan Patriotic Front-controlled Kigali.

He was the Deputy Director of the National UK AIDS programme during the 1990s.

He was Head of Conflict and Humanitarian Affairs unit of the British Department for International Development from 1998 to 2002. From 2002 to 2003, he was a Special Adviser to the United Nations, first to the Special Representative of the Secretary General in Afghanistan and then to the High Commissioner for Human Rights. In 2003–2004, Kapila was the United Nations Resident and Humanitarian Coordinator, and the UN Development Program Resident Representative for the Sudan.

While stationed in Sudan, he was outspoken in his condemnation of the human rights abuses being committed in the western region of Darfur. His activism began after a Darfuri woman came to his office to tell him how she, her daughter and 200 other women in the village of Tawilla had been gang-raped and mostly murdered by government soldiers and paramilitaries. His reports about the Darfur conflict were at the time dismissed by the Government of Sudan as "a heap of lies", though they succeeded in bringing Darfur to the attention of the world's media for the first time. Kapila was transferred out of Sudan in April 2004, only 13 months into a 24-month assignment. Commenting in 2006 on this period, Kapila stated:

There is debate about whether we had genocide in Darfur or not, but certainly in my mind, and the mind of many, many people, I think there is very little doubt that what went on in Darfur in 2003 and the early part of 2004 was certainly genocide. We can argue the words, but that would be no consolation to those people who are affected.
So I subsequently went on to speak about it publicly, having tried the various diplomatic routes and avenues, and I soon found myself hauled onto a plane out of Khartoum. And as I reflected back on it, I thought to myself that there I was presiding over the first genocide of the 21st century – it is a place in history you don't wish to have.

He was a Director in the Department of Health Action in Crises of the World Health Organization (2004 to 2006). An employee of the Government of the United Kingdom, he was on secondment to the United Nations. He was an Adviser to the World Bank on climate change issues, has advised the United Nations International Strategy for Disaster Reduction (UN/ISDR), and the International Labour Organization. He was the chief executive of PHG Foundation in Cambridge, UK from September 2003 to August 2004.

Prior to his appointment as Special Representative for the Aegis Trust, Kapila was the Under Secretary General for National Society and Knowledge Development at the International Federation of Red Cross and Red Crescent Societies (IFRC). Earlier he served as the Special Representative for HIV and AIDS, and subsequently as Special Representative to the Secretary General of the IFRC. While at IFRC, Kapila has been instrumental in developing worldwide "global alliances" of the Red Cross Red Crescent such as HIV and disaster risk reduction, where successful scale-up has been achieved. He has been responsible for formulating Strategy 2020 – the International Federation's vision for the next decade.

He has served as an Advisory Board member of the Geneva Centre for the Democratic Control of Armed Forces, and of Minority Rights Group International, and Executive committee member of the Alliance for Direct Action against Rape in Conflicts and Crises (AllianceDARC). He has been a member of the Board of Trustees of the United Nations Institute for Training and Research, the International Peace Academy and of the United Nations Disaster Assessment and Co-ordination (UNDAC) system.

In 2022 Kapila wrote blog posts about corruption at United Nations Office for Project Services, which lead to resignation of its leaders.

Kapila is a Senior Member of Hughes Hall College, Cambridge University, UK. He is also an Associate Fellow at the Humanitarian and Conflict Response Institute, The University of Manchester, UK.

== Selected publications ==
- Mukesh Kapila, Against a Tide of Evil, 2013, Pegasus Books, ISBN 978-0991099337
- Mukesh Kapila, No Stranger to Kindness, 2019, ISBN 979-8506914310

== Awards ==
In 2003, he was honoured by Queen Elizabeth II and named a Commander of the Order of the British Empire for his international service. In 2007 he received the Dr Jean Mayer Global Citizenship Award of the Institute for Global Leadership.

== See also ==
- Jan Pronk
