= Against a Tide of Evil =

2013 memoir by Mukesh Kapila

- Author: Mukesh Kapila
- Language: English
- Genre: Memoir
- Published: Mainstream Publishing
- Publication date: 2013
- ISBN: 978-1706663454

Against a Tide of Evil is a 2013 memoir by Mukesh Kapila about his time leading the United Nations in Sudan during the Darfur genocide.

== Publication ==
Against a Tide of Evil was written by former United Nations diplomat Mukesh Kapila and published in 2013 by Mainstream Publishing.

== Synopsis ==
Against a Tide of Evil documents the experiences of the author as he is deployed to Sudan as the most senior representative of the United Nations. Kapila is based in Khartoum as violence flares in Darfur during the genocide between 2003 and 2004. Kapila quickly becomes a whistleblower, reporting his analysis of the Sudanese government's role in the ethically targeted violence, including sexual violence. Kapila is shocked when the United Nations' enquiry concludes that actions of the Sudanese government do not amount to genocide.

The author is critical of the United Nations and argues that the world ignored the genocide in Darfur, despite the warnings that he and others made at the time.

== Critical reception ==
Kapila's writing is described as disarmingly personal by British academic Carol Kingston-Smith. Kingston-Smith credits the book for dealing with complexity, raising awareness and inviting the reader to reflect on their role in the world.
