= Kitchen Con =

2007 guide by Trevor White

- Author: Trevor White
- Language: English
- Subject: Food & Travel; Business; Finance
- Genre: Non-fiction
- Publisher: Mainstream Publishing
- Publication date: 4 October 2007
- Pages: 272
- ISBN: 978-1845962654
- OCLC: 148316342

Kitchen Con: Writing on the Restaurant Racket is a book about the restaurant business written by restaurant critic Trevor White, who is also the editor of The Dubliner Magazine and of a restaurant guide in Ireland - The Dubliner 100 Best Restaurants. The title of the book is a reference to Kitchen Confidential by Anthony Bourdain. In the book, White describes how he believes that diners are routinely duped, with reference to his own career and to some of the bigger names in what he calls "the racket", including Gordon Ramsay, Jean-Christophe Novelli and the Michelin Guide.

The book was published by Mainstream Publishing 5 September 2006.
