= Post-conflict aid =

Assistance granted to regions hit by war

Post-conflict aid is the monetary, material or technical assistance granted by other states, non-governmental organizations and private donors to regions that have recently been hit by either an international war, a civil war, or an armed conflict. The donation can take the form of food, financial investment, reconstruction materials and many others and aims to the re-attainment of sustainable socio-economic development as well as to the re-organization of the governmental and judicial structures and institutions in the war-torn region.

== Distinction from development and humanitarian aid ==
Post-conflict aid differs from the conventional development aid in many aspects. It is to some extent comparable to the aid granted in view of certain environmental catastrophes with huge impacts on the humanitarian situation. Just like countries facing a natural disaster, post-conflict countries are mainly confronted with a humanitarian emergency due to the destruction of infrastructures, institutions, public services and labor force as well as the death and injury of many people in the area. Hence, aid committed to the respective country can in both scenarios reach an extraordinarily high level but is likely to decline very rapidly as soon as the emergency has come under control. In both scenarios, technical help and human resources complement the material component of aid. In contrast, development aid is far more sustainable, not triggered by a single event, tied to certain conditions and mostly granted in the framework of an official international and national development program. Development aid is based on the principle help for self-help, whereas post-conflict and humanitarian aid strives to provide the means to manage a current crisis without a long-term plan. Still, post-conflict aid is more comprehensive that pure humanitarian aid directed to still the basic needs of medical supply, shelter and food in the aftermath of a humanitarian catastrophe. In its most encompassing form, post-conflict aid occurs during the reconstruction phase and the reinstallation of a functioning political system and the rule of laws.

== History of the development of post-conflict aid ==
Prior to the development of post-conflict aid, there was simply humanitarian aid and development aid. Yet, following conflict there was not often aid provided to the state that suffered devastating losses during the conflict. Instead, the state was now under the rule of the state who won the war. An example of this would be colonialism where the state that lost is now a colony of the state that won the conflict.

Post-conflict aid historically became distinct from other types of aid following World War II. The Marshall Plan, part of the resolution following World War II, planned to rebuild the mass destruction that was throughout Europe with America's assistance. While there was infrastructure to be rebuilt and basic human needs that needed to be met, along with this was the deterioration of Europe's economy. This is where the definition of post-conflict aid, aid that plans for socioeconomic development, originates from.

The focus on socioeconomic development is a direct side effect of the globalized war. States understood how much they had the ability to harm, and thus improve, based on the other states around the globe. The multiplier-effect explains how a singular dollar spent can produce massive amounts of market productivity and growth.

Similarly, following the Cold War, providing aid to benefit socioeconomic growth continued. While during the Cold War, the United States and the Soviet Union provided heavily politicized aid to promote a political ideology; following the Cold War aid continued to be used as an economic multiplier more than it was a political tool.

The third and final stage of the development of post-conflict aid takes place following 9/11 and the war in Afghanistan, marking the end of the long peace. During this time, major arms producers provided security aid. The military-industrial complex shows this is how states were able to provide aid while increasing demand for one of the most expensive markets.

Furthermore, the United Nations developed the triple nexus approach for providing post-crisis/ post-conflict aid. The triple nexus breaks down aid into a humanitarian component, a development component and a peacekeeping component which largely focuses on the socioeconomic issues that commonly spark conflicts or that the previous conflict took place centered around.

== Economics ==
A donor disbursing aid to conflict-torn country offers either humanitarian or reconstruction aid or splits its donation up. Reconstruction help (R) gets part of the receiving country's production function just like government spending would do since it is given to the country in order to invest it in the rebuilding of the economy.

$Y=f(k,l.R)$

A donor, in contrast, only gives humanitarian aid until the basic needs of the population are satisfied, that is, until the donor defined level of consumption (c*) is reached. As soon as the actual consumption c equals c*, humanitarian aid will come to a breakpoint. Else, the humanitarian aid provided depends also on the short-run generosity α of the donor, such that the overall post-conflict aid A is :

$A=H+R=\alpha(c*-c)+R$

=== Economic impacts ===
According to neo-classical growth models, high growth rates are expected to take place in post-conflict societies until the steady state capital stock is reached. Following the Collier-Dollar model explaining the impact of post-conflict aid on growth, we find that aid is generally subject to diminishing marginal returns and that the impact of post-conflict aid on growth highly depends on the policy environment, meaning that in a better policy environment aid is more effective in boosting growth, resulting in the following equation:

$G=c+b_{1}X+b_{2}P+b_{3}A+b_{4}A^2+b_{5}AP$

whereby X stands for any exogenous factors, P measures the quality of policy and A gives the amount of aid received by the conflict-torn country. In order to know the marginal impact of aid on growth, we derivate the above equation with respect to A:

${dG \over dA}=b_{3}+2b_{4}A+b_{5}P$

Hence, aid reaches its saturation point at:

$A^S={-(b_{3+b_{5}P)}\over 2b_{4}}$

Aid given to states that are currently in a post-conflict phase has also a signaling effect on foreign investors that would otherwise not be able to assess properly the situation on the ground due to the lack of information about credibility and economic potential. Aid reflects the support and trust that an economy enjoys. One should assume a rapid acceleration in economic growth after a short post-conflict period since the prevalent uncertainty, which is typical under war conditions is resolved once the reconstruction of political institutions has started. Thus, investment and (technical) innovation is more likely to take place. In addition to that, the labor productivity might increase due to a more peaceful environment and the gradual recovery of human capital thanks to health care, growing opportunities of education and research and better nutrition. If peace can be maintained, it is to be assumed that a phase of catch-up will take place which will coast out after a given time and then the economy will fall back to its long-term growth rate.

=== Effectiveness ===
Addressing the question of the effectiveness and sustainability of post-conflict aid, evaluations have shown that it differs between sectors. All in all, post-conflict aid is effective in improving social infrastructure, like education, health, water, sanitation, and governance, but ineffective in rebuilding economic infrastructure, like transportation, communication, energy, and finance. Studies from villages in northern Liberia could demonstrate that post-conflict reconstruction programs, as part of post-conflict aid can have a measurable impact on social cohesion in this villages with sustainable effects. The power of post-conflict aid to increase the overall level of foreign aid is rather small, suggesting that there are no spill-over effects in the long run, even if the respective economy is in need of long-term support. Thus, post-conflict aid is timely limited and has a rather small effect on the tong-term growth. According to the World Bank report, post-conflict aid should be phased in slowly so that it reaches its peak level in the middle of the first post-war decade. At this point, it should be doubled before being reduced.

== Aid patterns ==
Post-conflict aid is not granted without certain patterns but follows the donor's strategic rationales. The rationales can be of humanitarian nature or be based on the interest of implementing a peace agreement, typically in accordance to a political agenda. Another motivation might be the targeted state itself which might either be a client regime, or a region where the donor hopes to gain political or economic influence over. By looking at the donor-side, empirical research suggests multiple characteristics as useful predictors for post-conflict economic assistance: Aid from OECD countries starts in most cases in the aftermath of a conflict and increases over time, especially if OECD or UN Peacekeeping troops were involved during the conflict or the conflict management. OECD countries provide more aid to countries with a high level of democracy and an open-market economy but are more reluctant to provide it for (highly) developed countries. They are also more likely to assist countries which are undergoing a regime transition or change, especially if this leads to a donor-favored regime or peace agreement. But even countries with a donor-favored regime or peace agreement can lose funding in cases of ineffective policy-implementation, human rights considerations or a reduced sense of emergency. On the average this happens three to four years after the conflict.
