= My Life, Our Times =

2017 memoir by Gordon Brown

- First edition
- Author: Gordon Brown
- Language: English
- Genre: Memoir
- Publisher: The Bodley Head
- Publication date: 7 November 2017
- Publication place: United Kingdom
- Pages: 512
- ISBN: 9781784707460

My Life, Our Times is a memoir by the former Prime Minister of the United Kingdom and Chancellor of the Exchequer, Gordon Brown. It was published on 7 November 2017 by The Bodley Head, a subdivision of Random House. The book follows the stages in Brown's personal and political life, from his upbringing in Scotland to his tenures as Chancellor of the Exchequer and Prime Minister, with his own behind-the-scenes account of the 2008 financial crisis.

== Publication ==
Brown's much-anticipated memoir was published on 7 November 2017. In a Waterstones interview a few days after its launch, journalist Robert Peston put forward the idea that Gordon Brown was in many ways an underrated politician and an underrated Chancellor. Brown was subsequently approached by Waterstones and interviewed, where he explained how he had chosen the right time to write his memoir; "I think this is the right time, seven years on, to explain what you've been doing, how you saw the events at the time, what lessons you learnt and how the past shapes our future." Revelations in the post-release interview included Brown's admiration for Nelson Mandela's autobiography Long Walk to Freedom, and his initial career plan to become a footballer rather than an MP.

My Life, Our Time was reprinted by Vintage Books on 24 May 2018. On 3 June, Brown attended an event at Cardiff City Stadium to discuss the book, with Labour MP Kevin Brennan.

== Reception ==
My Life, Our Times received mixed reviews from critics.

Writing in The Guardian, political journalist and specialist on New Labour, Andrew Rawnsley, noted the memoir's most riveting moments concerned the 2008 financial crisis; "the most valuable chapters here are those that describe how they averted a total implosion of the banking system". The paper praised Brown, saying he was "Miles ahead of anyone you can name currently in office at Westminster. Brown thinks, and thinks profoundly. And by and large, over the last 30 years, what he has thought has turned out to be correct." He went on to say the memoir was "thrilling" and "unexpectedly moving".

The Financial Times summarised the book by saying "the former Labour Prime Minister resisted the usual pressures to produce an instant memoir. To the frustration of the casual reader (and perhaps the publisher) he resists the temptation to engage in much gossip either. What Brown does provide is some score-settling, more self-criticism than one might expect, and a sense of deep frustration that his long wait to become prime minister ended with him struggling to cope with the job and seeing his economic legacy come crashing down." Peter Mandelson reviewed the memoir in the Evening Standard, also praising Brown's book.

== See also ==
- A Journey, the political memoir of Tony Blair, the first Prime Minister under New Labour.
