= Community Links =

Local charity organization in East London

Community Links is a multipurpose charity operating in the East London borough of Newham. It was established by David Robinson OBE and Kevin Jenkins OBE in 1977, and has grown to become one of the UK's largest local charities.

In 2011 Community Links was selected as one of the charities supported by The Guardian's Christmas appeal. Guardian Editor Alan Rusbridger said, "The legendary Community Links charity wrote the book on how to regenerate deprived neighbourhoods and engage with young people."

The organisation has led and developed several innovative projects. Community Links’ advice sessions on unsafe tower block estates in the 1980s inspired the Newham Tower Block Tenants Campaign, and led to demolition of the Ronan Point Tower Block 1986 and establishment of The National Tower Block Campaign.

Former Prime Minister Gordon Brown co-wrote a book with Community Links in 2007. In Britain's Everyday Heroes, Brown referred to Community Links as "the innovative charity at the forefront of community regeneration".

In 2007 Social Finance, along with government, Community Links and St Giles Trust launched the UK’s first social impact bond, a financial instrument designed to raise capital from outside the public sector to pilot new projects tackling social issues. The idea was conceived at Community Links through the Council on Social Action which was convened and chaired by Community Links founder David Robinson. He is chair of Peterborough Prison’s One programme – the first project in the UK to be funded by a Social Impact Bond, and a member of the Big Society Trust, the holding company for Big Society Capital.

Community Links convened and hosts the Early Action Taskforce, which was launched in January 2011. Its members include Sir Stuart Etherington, CEO of the National Council for Voluntary Organisations, and Dame Clare Tickell, CEO of Action for Children. The Early Action Taskforce aims to answer the question "how do we build a society that prevents problems from occurring rather than one that, as now, copes with the consequences?" The Taskforce’s first report, The Triple Dividend: Thriving Lives, Costing Less, Contributing More was launched in September 2011.
