= Britain's Everyday Heroes =

Book by Gordon Brown

- Author: Gordon Brown
- Language: English
- Subject: Politics
- Genre: Non-fiction
- Publisher: Mainstream Publishing
- Publication date: 24 July 2007
- Publication place: United Kingdom
- Media type: Paperback
- Pages: 240
- ISBN: 978-1-84596-307-1
- OCLC: 145389857
- Dewey Decimal: 361.2/50941 22
- LC Class: HN385.5 .B759 2007
- Preceded by: Courage: Eight Portraits
- Followed by: The Change We Choose

Britain's Everyday Heroes is a book by former British Prime Minister Gordon Brown about thirty-three ordinary people whose willing commitment to a cause or a community has informed and inspired Brown. It was published by Mainstream Publishing on 24 July 2007, less than a month after Brown became prime minister.

The book was produced in conjunction with East London charity Community Links, who will receive all royalties from sales. According to The Independent, the book had sold fewer than 1,000 copies by March 2010.
