= Gordon Brown =

Prime Minister of the United Kingdom from 2007 to 2010

The Right Honourable Gordon Brown CH
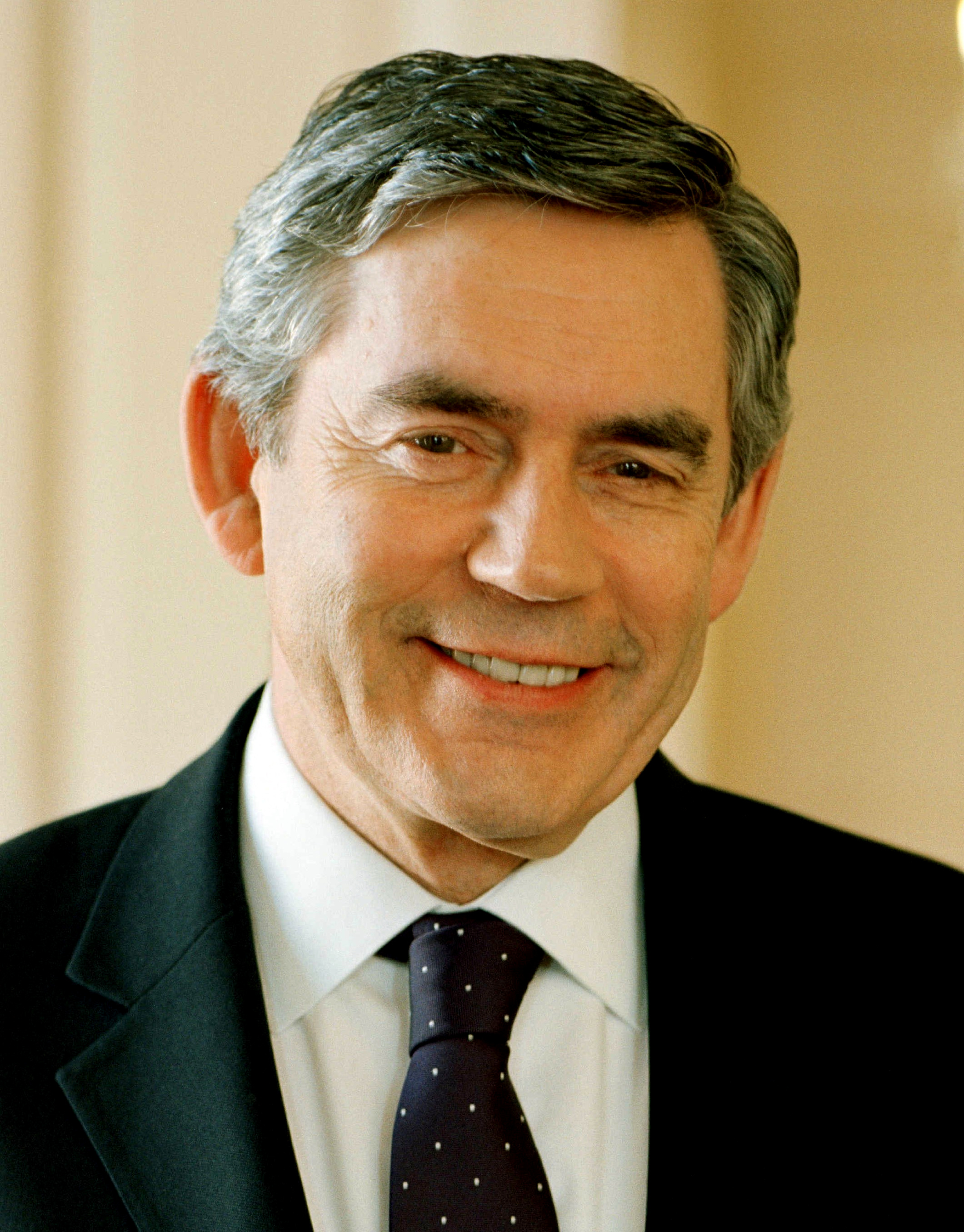
- Official portrait, 2008

Prime Minister of the United Kingdom
- In office 27 June 2007 – 11 May 2010
- Monarch: Elizabeth II
- First Secretary: The Lord Mandelson (2009–10)
- Preceded by: Tony Blair
- Succeeded by: David Cameron

Leader of the Labour Party
- In office 24 June 2007 – 11 May 2010
- Deputy: Harriet Harman
- Preceded by: Tony Blair
- Succeeded by: Ed Miliband (Note: Harriet Harman was acting leader from 11 May to 25 September 2010)

Chancellor of the Exchequer
- In office 2 May 1997 – 28 June 2007
- Prime Minister: Tony Blair
- Preceded by: Kenneth Clarke
- Succeeded by: Alistair Darling
Shadow Cabinet posts
Shadow Chancellor of the Exchequer
In office 18 July 1992 – 2 May 1997
Leader	John Smith; Margaret Beckett (acting); Tony Blair
Preceded by	John Smith
Succeeded by	Kenneth Clarke
Shadow Secretary of State for Trade and Industry
In office 2 November 1989 – 18 July 1992
Leader	Neil Kinnock
Preceded by	Bryan Gould
Succeeded by	Robin Cook
Shadow Chief Secretary to the Treasury
In office 13 July 1987 – 2 November 1989
Leader	Neil Kinnock
Preceded by	Bryan Gould
Succeeded by	Margaret Beckett
Envoy posts
United Kingdom Special Envoy on Global Finance and Cooperation
Incumbent
Assumed office 9 May 2026
Prime Minister	Keir Starmer; Andy Burnham
Preceded by	Office established
World Health Organization Ambassador for Global Health Financing
Incumbent
Assumed office 20 September 2021
Director-General	Tedros Adhanom Ghebreyesus
Preceded by	Office established
United Nations Special Envoy for Global Education
Incumbent
Assumed office 13 July 2012
Secretary-General	Ban Ki-moon; António Guterres
Preceded by	Office established

Member of Parliament for Kirkcaldy and Cowdenbeath Dunfermline East (1983–2005)
- In office 9 June 1983 – 30 March 2015
- Preceded by: Constituency established
- Succeeded by: Roger Mullin

Personal details
- Born: James Gordon Brown; 20 February 1951 (age 75) Giffnock, Renfrewshire, Scotland
- Party: Labour
- Spouse: Sarah Macaulay (m. 2000)
- Children: 3
- Education: University of Edinburgh (MA, PhD)
- Website: gordonandsarahbrown.com
- Gordon Brown's voice Brown on education and infrastructure in the Middle East and North Africa; Recorded 30 March 2015

James Gordon Brown (born 20 February 1951) is a British politician who served as Prime Minister of the United Kingdom and Leader of the Labour Party from 2007 to 2010. Previously, he was Chancellor of the Exchequer from 1997 to 2007 under Tony Blair. Brown was Member of Parliament (MP) for Dunfermline East from 1983 to 2005 and for Kirkcaldy and Cowdenbeath from 2005 to 2015. He has served as United Nations Special Envoy for Global Education since 2012, and he was appointed as World Health Organization Ambassador for Global Health Financing in 2021. In 2026, then-Prime Minister Keir Starmer appointed Brown as a special envoy on global finance and cooperation.

Brown studied history at the University of Edinburgh, where he received a doctorate. He spent his early career as a lecturer at a further education college and as a television journalist. Brown was elected to the House of Commons at the 1983 general election as the MP for Dunfermline East. He was appointed to Neil Kinnock's shadow cabinet in 1989 and was named Shadow Chancellor of the Exchequer by John Smith in 1992. Following Labour's victory in the 1997 general election, Brown was appointed as chancellor, becoming the longest-serving in modern history. Brown's time as chancellor was marked by major reform of Britain's monetary and fiscal policy architecture, transferring interest rate setting to the Bank of England, extending the powers of the Treasury to cover much domestic policy, and transferring banking supervision to the Financial Services Authority. Brown presided over the longest period of economic growth in British history. He outlined five economic tests, which resisted the UK adopting the euro. Controversial moves included the abolition of advance corporation tax (ACT) relief in his first budget, the sale of UK gold reserves from 1999 to 2002, and the removal in his final budget of the 10% starting rate of income tax that he had introduced in the 1999 budget.

Following Blair's resignation in 2007, Brown was elected unopposed to succeed him as prime minister and party leader. The party continued as New Labour, though Brown's style of government differed from Blair's. He remained committed to close ties with the United States and to the war in Iraq, although he established an inquiry into the reasons for Britain's participation in the conflict. Brown's government introduced rescue packages to keep banks afloat during the 2008 financial crisis, and so national debt increased. The government took majority shareholdings in Northern Rock and Royal Bank of Scotland, which had experienced severe financial difficulties, and injected public money into other banks. In 2008, Brown's government passed the world's first Climate Change Act, and he also introduced the Equality Act 2010. Despite a poll boost just after Brown became prime minister, his popularity fell after he failed to call a snap election in 2007, and Labour's popularity declined with the Great Recession. Labour lost 91 seats in the 2010 general election, resulting in a hung parliament in which the Conservative Party won the most seats. After the Conservatives formed a coalition government with the Liberal Democrats, Brown was succeeded as prime minister by Conservative leader David Cameron, and as Labour leader by Ed Miliband.

After leaving office, Brown returned to the backbenches, continuing to serve as MP for Kirkcaldy and Cowdenbeath until he gave up his seat in 2015. He has since made occasional political interventions and has published politically themed books. Brown played a prominent role in the campaign to maintain the union during the 2014 Scottish independence referendum, and he wrote a report on devolution in 2022 for Labour leader Keir Starmer. Brown has served as the United Nations Special Envoy for Global Education, as well as the World Health Organization's Ambassador for Global Health Financing. He was awarded the Order of the Companions of Honour by King Charles III in the 2024 Birthday Honours for public and charitable services in the UK and abroad. As chancellor, Brown had high approval ratings; a poll of political scientists rated him the most successful post-war chancellor in terms of economic stability, working independently from the prime minister and leaving a lasting legacy on the British economy. His premiership has been viewed less favourably; although public opinion of Brown has improved since he left office, his premiership has been viewed as average in historical rankings and public opinion of British prime ministers.

== Early life ==
James Gordon Brown was born on 20 February 1951 at the Orchard Maternity Nursing Home in Giffnock, Renfrewshire, Scotland. His father was John Ebenezer Brown (1914–1998), a minister of the Church of Scotland and a strong influence on Brown. His mother was Jessie Elizabeth "Bunty" Brown (née Souter; 1918–2004); she was the daughter of John Souter, a timber merchant. The family moved to Kirkcaldy – then the largest town in Fife, across the Firth of Forth from Edinburgh – when Gordon was three. Brown was brought up there with his elder brother John and younger brother Andrew in a manse; he is therefore often referred to as a "son of the manse", an idiomatic Scottish phrase, similar to the American phrase "preacher's kid".

=== Education ===
Brown was educated first at Kirkcaldy West Primary School, where he was selected for an experimental fast stream education programme, which took him two years early to Kirkcaldy High School for an academic hothouse education taught in separate classes. Aged 16, he wrote that he loathed and resented this "ludicrous" experiment on young lives.

He was accepted by the University of Edinburgh to study history at the same early age of 16. During an end-of-term rugby union match at his old school, he received a kick to the head and experienced a retinal detachment. This left him blind in his left eye, despite treatment including several operations and weeks spent lying in a darkened room. Later at Edinburgh, while playing tennis, he noticed the same symptoms in his right eye. Brown underwent experimental surgery at the Edinburgh Royal Infirmary and his right eye was saved by a young eye surgeon, Hector Chawla. After following the honours programme, Brown graduated from Edinburgh with an undergraduate MA degree with First-Class Honours in history in 1972. He stayed on to obtain his PhD degree in history, which he gained ten years later in 1982, defending a thesis titled The Labour Party and Political Change in Scotland 1918–1929.

In his youth at the University of Edinburgh, Brown was involved in a romantic relationship with Margarita, Crown Princess of Romania. Margarita said about it: "It was a very solid and romantic story. I never stopped loving him but one day it didn't seem right anymore, it was politics, politics, politics, and I needed nurturing." An unnamed friend of those years is quoted by Paul Routledge in his biography of Brown as recalling: "She was sweet and gentle and obviously cut out to make somebody a very good wife. She was bright, too, though not like him, but they seemed made for each other."

In 1972, while still a student, Brown was elected Rector of the University of Edinburgh, the convener of the University Court. He served as Rector until 1975, and also edited the document The Red Paper on Scotland.

He was also elected as the President of the Diagnostic Society of Edinburgh.

=== Career before Parliament ===
From 1976 to 1980 Brown was employed as a lecturer in politics at Glasgow College of Technology. He also worked as a tutor for the Open University. In the 1979 general election, Brown stood for the Edinburgh South constituency, losing to the Conservative candidate, Michael Ancram.

From 1980, he worked as a journalist at Scottish Television, later serving as current affairs editor until his election to Parliament in 1983.

== Election to Parliament and opposition ==
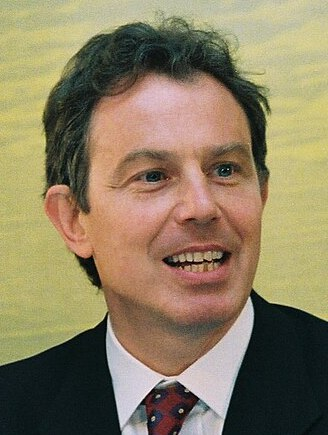
Tony Blair (pictured) was a close colleague of Brown. Together, they made a pact (Blair–Brown deal) that Brown would succeed Blair as prime minister.

Brown was elected to Parliament as a Labour MP at his second attempt, for Dunfermline East in the 1983 general election. His first Westminster office mate was a newly elected MP from the Sedgefield constituency, Tony Blair. Brown became an opposition spokesman on Trade and Industry in 1985. In 1986, he published a biography of the Independent Labour Party politician James Maxton, the subject of his doctoral thesis. Brown was Shadow Chief Secretary to the Treasury from 1987 to 1989 and then Shadow Secretary of State for Trade and Industry.

He became Shadow Chancellor in 1992 following Labour's fourth consecutive defeat in the general election that year. Having led the Labour Movement Yes campaign, refusing to join the cross-party Yes for Scotland campaign, during the 1979 Scottish devolution referendum, while other senior Labour politicians – including Robin Cook, Tam Dalyell and Brian Wilson – campaigned for a No vote, Brown was subsequently a key participant in the Scottish Constitutional Convention, signing the Claim of Right for Scotland in 1989.

Labour leader John Smith died suddenly in May 1994. Brown did not contest the leadership after Tony Blair became the favourite to win the 1994 leadership election, deciding to make way for Blair to avoid splitting the pro-modernising vote in the leadership ballot. It has long been rumoured a deal was struck between Blair and Brown at the former Granita restaurant in Islington, in which Blair promised to give Brown control of economic policy in return for Brown not standing against him in the leadership election. Whether this is true or not, the relationship between Blair and Brown was central to the fortunes of New Labour, and they mostly remained united in public, despite reported serious private rifts.

As Shadow Chancellor, Brown as Chancellor-in-waiting was seen as a good choice by business and the middle class. During his tenure as chancellor, the rate of inflation sometimes exceeded the 2% target; the Governor of the Bank of England, under the rules governing the Bank's role, wrote an explanatory letter to the Chancellor on each occasion inflation exceeded three per cent. Following a reorganisation of Westminster constituencies in Scotland in 2005, Brown became MP for Kirkcaldy and Cowdenbeath at the general election.

== Chancellor of the Exchequer (1997–2007) ==
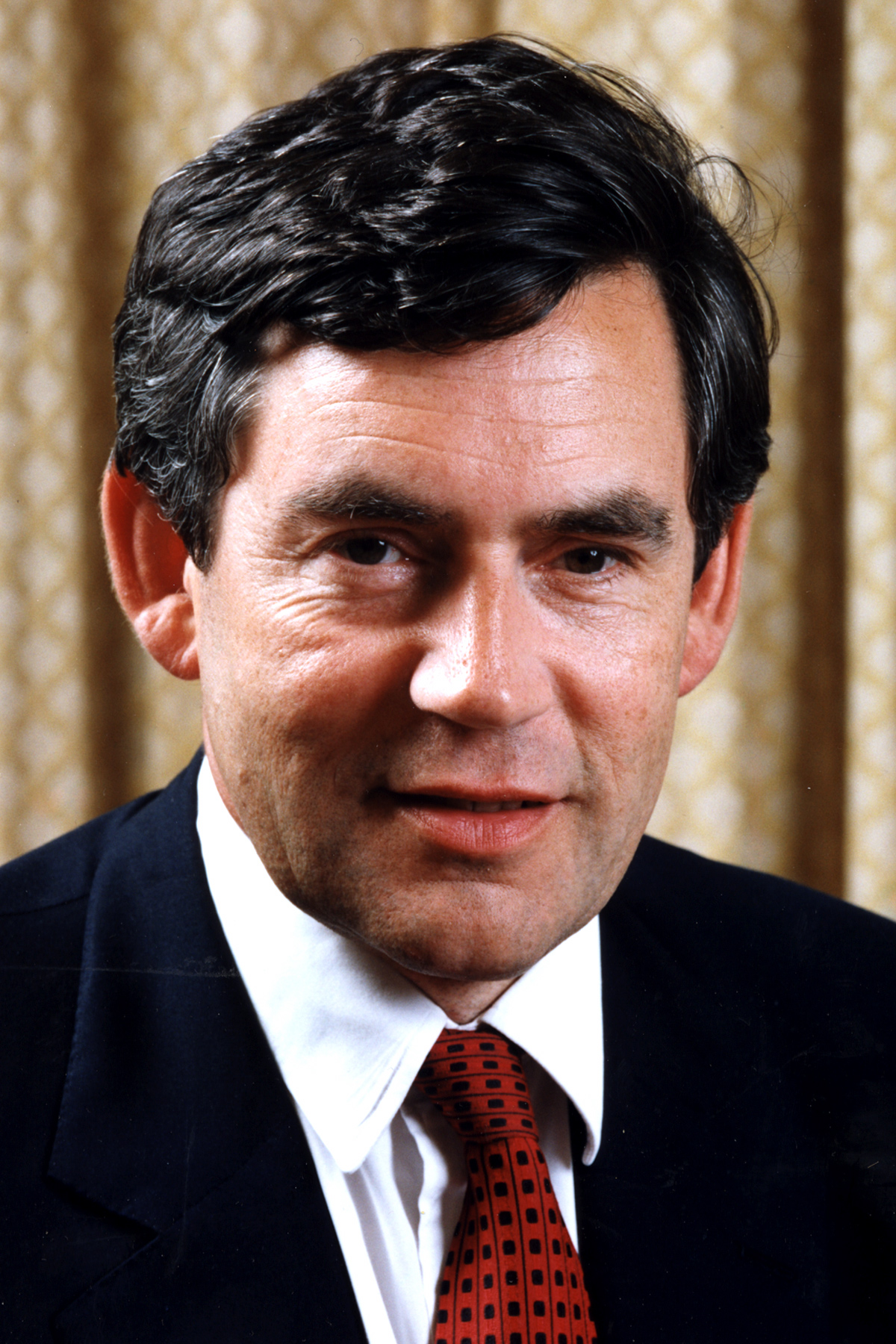
Brown's official portrait during his chancellorship

In the 1997 general election, Labour defeated the Conservatives by a landslide to end their 18-year exile from government, and when Tony Blair, the new prime minister, announced his ministerial team on 2 May 1997, he appointed Brown as Chancellor of the Exchequer. Brown would remain in this role for 10 years and two months, making him the longest-serving Chancellor in modern history. Some achievements from Brown's decade as chancellor included making the Bank of England independent and delivering an agreement on poverty and climate change at the G8 summit in 2005.

=== Early economic reforms ===
On taking office as chancellor, Brown gave the Bank of England operational independence in monetary policy, and thus responsibility for setting interest rates through the Bank's Monetary Policy Committee. At the same time, he also changed the inflation measure from the Retail Price Index to the Consumer Price Index and transferred responsibility for banking supervision to the Financial Services Authority. Some commentators have argued that this division of responsibilities exacerbated the severity in Britain of the 2008 financial crisis.

=== Taxation and spending ===
During the 1997 election campaign and subsequently, Brown pledged not to increase the basic or higher rates of income tax. Over his Chancellorship he reduced the basic rate from 23% to 20%; however, in all budgets but his final one, he increased the tax thresholds in line with inflation rather than with earnings, resulting in fiscal drag. Under Brown, corporation tax fell from a main rate of 33% to 28%, and from 24% to 19% for small businesses. In 1999, he introduced a lower income tax band of 10%. He abolished this 10% tax band in his last budget in 2007 to reduce the basic rate from 22% to 20%, increasing tax for 5 million people and, according to the calculations of the Institute for Fiscal Studies, leaving those earning between £5,000 and £18,000 as the biggest losers.

To backbench cheers, Brown had described the measure in his last Budget thus: "Having put in place more focused ways of incentivising work and directly supporting children and pensioners at a cost of £3bn a year, I can now return income tax to just two rates by removing the 10p band on non-savings income". Brown also implemented the Windfall Tax in 1997 on the privatised utilities. The tax produced an estimated one-off income to the government of £5 billion, which was used to fund the New Deal for Young People, a welfare-to-work program that sought to tackle long-term unemployment.

According to the OECD, UK taxation increased from a 39.3% share of gross domestic product in 1997 to 42.4% in 2006, going to a higher level than that of Germany. This increase has mainly been attributed to active government policy, and not simply to the growing economy. Conservatives have accused Brown of imposing "stealth taxes". A commonly reported example resulted in 1997 from a technical change in the way corporation tax is collected, the indirect effect of which was for the dividends on stock investments held within pensions to be taxed, thus lowering pension returns and contributing to the demise of most of the final salary pension funds in the UK.

Brown's 2000 Spending Review outlined a major expansion of government spending, particularly on health and education. In his April 2002 budget, Brown increased National Insurance to pay for health spending. He also introduced working tax credits, and in his last budget as chancellor, Brown gave an extra £3 billion in pension allowances, an increase in the child tax credit, and an increase in the working tax credit. These increases were followed by another £1 billion of support for increases in the child tax credit.

Under Brown, the tax code, the standard guide to tax, doubled in length to 17,000 pages.

=== European single currency ===
In October 1997, Brown announced that the Treasury would set five economic tests to determine whether the economic case had been made for the United Kingdom to adopt the European single currency. The Treasury indicated that the tests had not been passed in June 2003.

=== Other issues ===
In 2000, Brown was accused of starting a political row about higher education, referred to as the Laura Spence affair, when he accused the University of Oxford of elitism in its admissions procedures, describing its decision not to offer a place to state school pupil Laura Spence as "absolutely outrageous". Lord Jenkins, then Oxford Chancellor and himself a former Labour Chancellor of the Exchequer, said "nearly every fact he used was false."

Between 1999 and 2002 Brown sold 60% of the UK's gold reserves shortly before gold entered a protracted bull market, since nicknamed by dealers as the Brown Bottom or Brown's Bottom. The official reason for selling the gold reserves was to reduce the portfolio risk of the UK's reserves by diversifying away from gold. Since then, Brown's decision to sell the gold has been widely criticised.

As Chancellor, Brown argued against renationalising the railways, saying at the Labour conference in 2004 that it would cost £22 billion.

During his time as chancellor, Brown reportedly believed that it was appropriate to remove most, but not all, of the unpayable Third World debt. On 20 April 2006, in a speech to the United Nations Ambassadors, Brown outlined a "Green" view of global development.

=== Labour leadership bid ===
In October 2004, Blair announced he would not lead the party into a fourth general election, but would serve a full third term. Political comment over the relationship between Brown and Blair continued up to and beyond the 2005 election, which Labour won with a reduced majority and reduced vote share. Blair announced on 7 September 2006 that he would step down within a year.

Brown was the clear favourite to succeed Blair; he was the only candidate spoken of seriously in Westminster. Appearances and news coverage leading up to the handover were interpreted as preparing the ground for Brown to become prime minister, in part by creating the impression of a statesman with a vision for leadership and global change. This enabled Brown to signal the most significant priorities for his agenda as prime minister; speaking at a Fabian Society conference on 'The Next Decade' in January 2007, he stressed education, international development, narrowing inequalities (to pursue 'equality of opportunity and fairness of outcome'), renewing Britishness, restoring trust in politics, and winning hearts and minds in the war on terror as key priorities.

On 11 May 2007, after months of speculation, Brown formally announced his bid for the Labour leadership. He launched his campaign website the same day as formally announcing his bid for leadership, titled "Gordon Brown for Britain". On 16 May, Channel 4 News announced that Andrew MacKinlay had nominated Brown, giving him 308 nominations—enough to avoid a leadership contest. A BBC report states that the decisive nomination was made by Tony Wright with MacKinlay yet to nominate at that point. Brown replaced Blair as Leader of the Labour Party on 24 June 2007.

== Prime Minister (2007–2010) ==
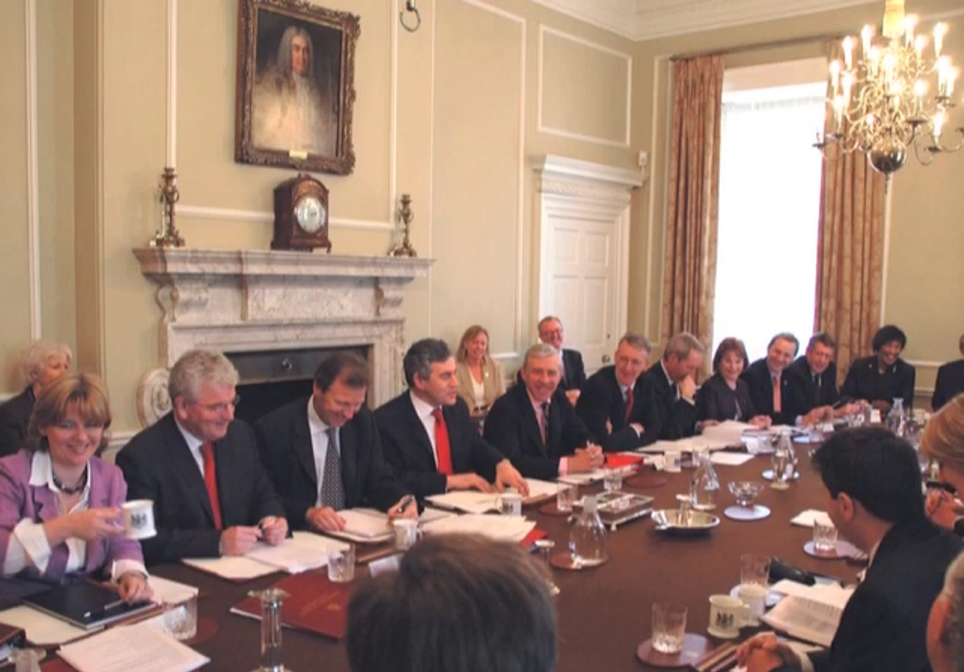
Brown chairing his first cabinet meeting

After Blair tendered his resignation to Queen Elizabeth II, Brown was invited by the queen to form a government and become prime minister on 27 June 2007. In his first speech as prime minister, Brown said "This will be a new government with new priorities and I have been privileged to have been granted the great opportunity to serve my country. And at all times I will be strong in purpose, steadfast in will, resolute in action, in the service of what matters to the British people, meeting the concerns and aspirations of our whole country."

Brown rescinded some of the policies which had been introduced or were planned by Blair's administration. He remained committed to close ties with the United States and to the war in Iraq, although he established an inquiry into the reasons for Britain's participation in the conflict. He proposed a "government of all the talents" which would involve co-opting leading personalities from industry and professional occupations into government positions. Brown also appointed Jacqui Smith as the UK's first female Home Secretary, while Brown's former position as chancellor of the exchequer was taken over by Alistair Darling.

He proposed moving some traditional prime ministerial powers conferred by royal prerogative to the realm of Parliament, such as the power to declare war and approve appointments to senior positions. Brown wanted Parliament to gain the right to ratify treaties and have more oversight of the intelligence services. He also proposed moving some powers from Parliament to citizens, including the right to form "citizens' juries", easily petition Parliament for new laws, and rally outside Westminster. He asserted that the attorney general should not have the right to decide whether to prosecute in individual cases, such as in the loans for peerages scandal.

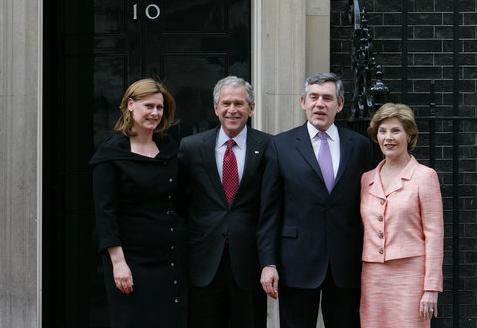
Brown and George W. Bush, President of the United States, meet at Downing Street, June 2008

There was speculation during September and early October 2007 about whether Brown would call a snap general election. The party launched the Not flash, just Gordon advertising campaign, which was seen largely as pre-election promotion of Brown as prime minister. On 6 October, Brown announced that there would be no election any time soon – despite opinion polls showing that he was capable of winning an election should he call one.

This proved to be a costly mistake, as during 2008 his party slid behind the Conservatives, led by David Cameron, in the polls. Disputes over political donations, a string of losses in local elections, and by-election losses in Crewe and Glasgow did himself and the government no favours either. Brown has since claimed that Labour would have won the 2007 election but he did not believe an early election was in the national interest.

His political opponents accused him of being indecisive, which Brown denied. In July 2008, he supported a new bill extending the pre-charge detention period to 42 days. The bill was met with opposition on both sides of the House and backbench rebellion. In the end, the bill passed by just nine votes. The House of Lords defeated the bill, with Lords characterising it as "fatally flawed, ill thought through and unnecessary", stating that "it seeks to further erode fundamental legal and civil rights".

Brown was mentioned by the press in the expenses crisis for claiming for the payment of his cleaner; however, no wrongdoing was found and the Commons Authority did not pursue Brown over the claim. Meanwhile, the Commons Fees Office stated that a double payment for a £153 plumbing repair bill was a mistake on their part and that Brown had repaid it in full.

=== Domestic policy ===
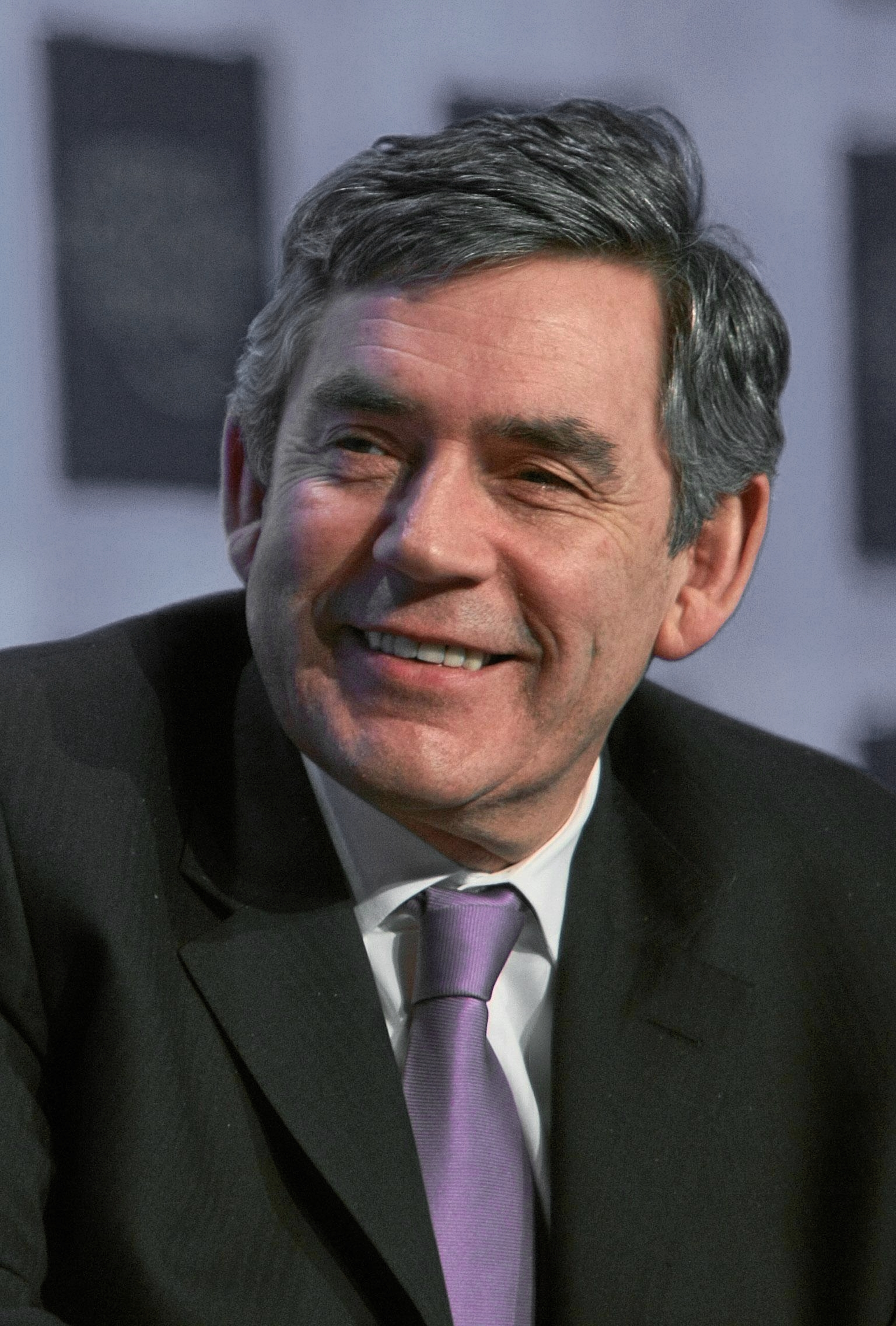
Brown at the World Economic Forum meeting in Davos in 2008

During his Labour leadership campaign Brown proposed some policy initiatives, which he called the manifesto for change.

The manifesto included a clampdown on corruption and a new Ministerial Code, which set out clear standards of behaviour for ministers. He also stated in a speech when announcing his bid that he wanted a "better constitution" that is "clear about the rights and responsibilities of being a citizen in Britain today". He planned to set up an all-party convention to look at new powers for Parliament and to look at rebalancing powers between Whitehall and local government. Brown said he would give Parliament the final say on whether British troops were sent into action in future.

He said he wanted to release more land and ease access to ownership with shared equity schemes. He backed a proposal to build new eco-towns, each housing between 10,000 and 20,000 homeowners – up to 100,000 new homes in total. Brown also said he wanted to have doctors' surgeries open at the weekends, and GPs on call in the evenings. Doctors were given the right of opting out of out-of-hours care in 2007, under a controversial pay deal, signed by then-Health Secretary John Reid, which awarded them a 22 per cent pay rise in 2006.

On 5 June 2007, just three weeks before he was due to take the post of prime minister, Brown made a speech promising "British Jobs for British workers". Brown reiterated that promise at the Labour Party's annual conference in September, which caused controversy as he coupled this with a commitment to crack down on migrant workers. The Conservative Party, led by David Cameron, promptly pointed out that such a commitment was illegal under EU law. Other controversial statements made by Brown about migration included him stating that English lessons and taking mandatory community service should be prerequisites for being granted UK citizenship.

During the Queen's Speech to Parliament on 3 December 2008, the Brown government unveiled plans to introduce lie detector tests, based on voice recognition technology, in order to determine whether to accept benefit claims. Despite having spent £2.4 million on these tests, trials performed by the Department for Work and Pensions showed that they were inaccurate approximately four of every seven times they were used.

=== Foreign policy ===
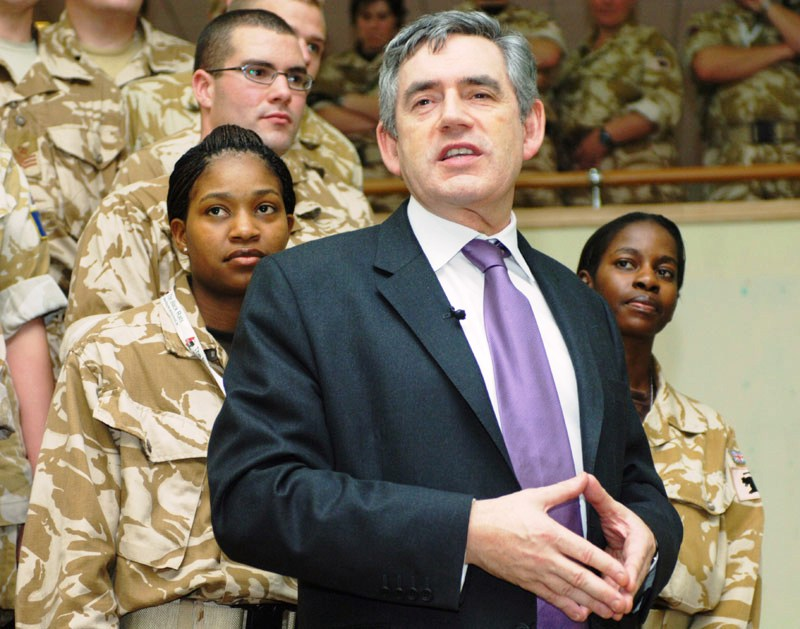
Brown meets British troops during a visit to Basra, 2007

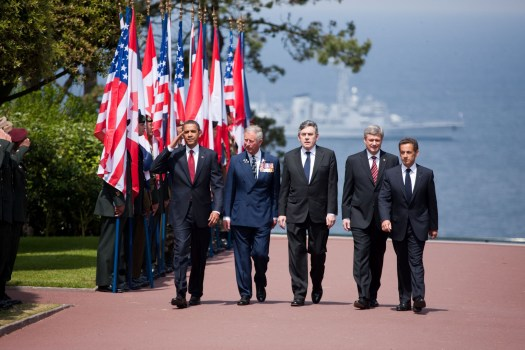
US president Barack Obama, Prince Charles, Brown, Canadian prime minister Stephen Harper and French president Nicolas Sarkozy arrive at the Colleville-sur-Mer cemetery to attend a ceremony marking the 65th anniversary of the D-Day landings in Normandy, 6 June 2009.

Brown had been committed to the Iraq War, but said in a speech in June 2007 that he would "learn the lessons" from the mistakes made in Iraq. Brown said in a letter published on 17 March 2008 that the United Kingdom would hold an inquiry into the war.

Brown went to great lengths to empathise with those who lost family members in the Iraq and Afghanistan conflicts. He has often said "War is tragic", echoing Blair's quote, "War is horrible". Nonetheless, in November 2007 Brown was accused by some senior military figures of not adhering to the Military Covenant, a convention within British politics ensuring adequate safeguards, rewards and compensation for military personnel who risk their lives in obedience to orders derived from the policy of the elected government.

Brown did not attend the opening ceremony of the 2008 Summer Olympics on 8 August 2008 in Beijing; instead, he attended the closing ceremony on 24 August 2008. Brown had been under intense pressure from human rights campaigners to send a message to China, concerning the 2008 Tibetan unrest. His decision not to attend the opening ceremony was not an act of protest, but rather was made several weeks in advance and not intended as a stand on principle.

In a speech in July 2007, Brown clarified his position regarding Britain's relationship with the United States: "We will not allow people to separate us from the United States of America in dealing with the common challenges that we face around the world. I think people have got to remember that the special relationship between a British prime minister and an American president is built on the things that we share, the same enduring values about the importance of liberty, opportunity, the dignity of the individual. I will continue to work, as Tony Blair did, very closely with the American administration."

Brown and the Labour party had pledged to allow a referendum on the Constitutional Treaty. On 13 December 2007, Foreign Secretary David Miliband attended for the Prime Minister at the official signing ceremony for the Treaty of Lisbon. Brown's opponents on both sides of the House, and in the press, suggested that ratification by Parliament was not enough and that a referendum should also be held. Labour's 2005 manifesto had pledged to give the British public a referendum on the original EU Constitution. Brown argued that the Treaty significantly differed from the Constitution, and as such did not require a referendum. Most notably the Supremacy Clause was removed and replaced with a substantially weaker declaration. He also responded with plans for a lengthy debate on the topic, and stated that he believed the document to be too complex to be decided by referendum.

=== Drug policy ===
During Brown's premiership, in October 2008, the Advisory Council on the Misuse of Drugs (ACMD) recommended to the then Home Secretary Jacqui Smith that cannabis remain classified as a Class C drug. Acting against the advice of the council, she chose to reclassify it as Class B. After Professor David Nutt, the chair of the ACMD, criticised this move in a lecture in 2009, he was asked to step down by then Home Secretary Alan Johnson. Following his resignation, Professor Nutt said Brown had "made up his mind" to reclassify cannabis despite evidence to the contrary. Brown had argued, "I don't think that the previous studies took into account that so much of the cannabis on the streets is now of a lethal quality and we really have got to send out a message to young people—this is not acceptable". Professor Nutt's predecessor at the ACMD, Sir Michael Rawlins, later said, "Governments may well have good reasons for taking an alternative view ... When that happens, then the government should explain why it's ignoring the particular advice".

=== Global recession ===
Brown's premiership coincided with the global recession, during which Brown called for fiscal action in an attempt to stimulate aggregate demand. Domestically, Brown's administration introduced measures including a bank rescue package worth around £500 billion (approximately $850 billion), a temporary 2.5 percentage point cut in value-added tax and a "car scrappage" scheme.

=== Challenges to leadership ===
In mid-2008, Brown's leadership was presented with a challenge as some MPs openly called for him to resign. This event was dubbed the 'Lancashire Plot', as two backbenchers from (pre-1974) Lancashire urged him to step down and a third questioned his chances of holding on to the Labour Party leadership. Several MPs argued that if Brown did not recover in the polls by early 2009, he should call for a leadership contest; however, certain prominent MPs, such as Jacqui Smith and Bill Rammell, suggested that Brown was the right person to lead Britain through its economic crisis.

In the autumn, Siobhain McDonagh, an MP and junior government whip, who during her time in office had never voted against the government, spoke of the need for discussion over Brown's position. While she did not state that she wanted Brown deposed, she implored the Labour Party to hold a leadership election. McDonagh was sacked from her role shortly afterward, on 12 September. She was supported in making clear her desire for a contest by Joan Ryan (who applied, as McDonagh had, for leadership nomination papers, and became the second rebel to be fired from her job), Jim Dowd, Greg Pope, and a string of others who had previously held positions in government.

In the face of this speculation over Brown's future, his ministers backed him to lead the party, and Harriet Harman and David Miliband denied that they were preparing leadership bids. After Labour lost the Glasgow East by-election in July, Harman, the deputy leader of the party, said that Brown was the "solution", not the "problem"; Home Secretary Smith, Justice Secretary Jack Straw, Schools Secretary Ed Balls and Cabinet Office Minister Ed Miliband all re-affirmed their support for Brown. The deputy prime minister under Blair, John Prescott, also pledged his support.

Foreign Secretary David Miliband then denied that he was plotting a leadership bid, when on 30 July, an article written by him in The Guardian was interpreted by a large number in the media as an attempt to undermine Brown. In the article, Miliband outlined the party's future, but neglected to mention the prime minister. Miliband, responded to this by saying that he was confident Brown could lead Labour to victory in the next general election, and that his article was an attack against the fatalism in the party since the loss of Glasgow East. Miliband continued to show his support for Brown in the face of the challenge that emerged in September, as did Business Secretary John Hutton, Environment Secretary Hilary Benn, and Chief Whip Geoff Hoon.

On 4 June 2009 James Purnell resigned from the Cabinet, and called for Brown's resignation as prime minister.

On 6 January 2010, Patricia Hewitt and Geoff Hoon jointly called for a secret ballot on the future of Brown's leadership. The call received little support, and the following day Hoon said that it appeared to have failed and was "over". Brown later referred to the call for a secret ballot as a "form of silliness".

=== By-elections and 2009 local and EU elections ===
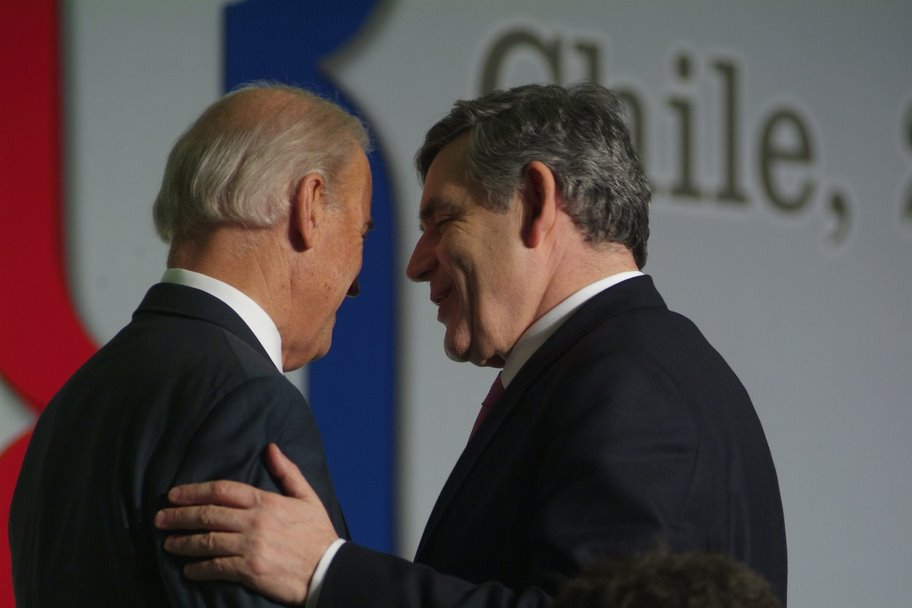
Brown greeting U.S. vice president (and future U.S. president) Joe Biden in Chile, April 2009

In the local elections on 1 May 2008, Labour suffered its worst results in 40 years, finishing in third place with a projected 24% share of the national vote. Subsequently, the party saw the loss of by-elections in Crewe and Nantwich and Henley as well as slumps in the polls. A by-election in Glasgow East triggered by the resignation of David Marshall saw Labour struggle to appoint a candidate, eventually settling for Margaret Curran, a sitting MSP in the Scottish Parliament. The SNP, Conservatives and Liberal Democrats all derided Labour for their disorganised nature, with Alex Salmond commenting "This is their 'lost weekend'—they don't have a leader in Scotland, they don't have a candidate in Glasgow East, and they have a prime minister who refuses to come to the constituency". Labour lost the constituency to the Scottish National Party's John Mason who took 11,277 votes, with Labour just 365 behind. The seat experienced a swing of 22.54%.

In the European elections, Labour polled 16% of the vote, finishing in third place behind the Conservatives and UK Independence Party (UKIP). Voter apathy was reflected in the historically low turnout of around thirty-three per cent. In Scotland, voter turnout was only twenty-eight per cent. In the local elections, Labour polled 23% of the vote, finishing in third place behind Conservatives and Liberal Democrats, with Labour losing control of the four councils it had held prior to the election. In a vote widely considered to be a reaction to the expenses scandal, the share of the votes was down for all the major parties; Labour was down one per cent, the Conservative share was down five per cent. The beneficiary of the public backlash was generally seen to be the minor parties, including the Green Party and UKIP. These results were Labour's worst since World War II. Brown was quoted in the press as having said that the results were "a painful defeat for Labour", and that "too many good people doing so much good for their communities and their constituencies have lost through no fault of their own."

=== 2010 general election ===
In April 2010, Brown asked the Queen to dissolve Parliament. The general election campaign included the first televised leadership debates in Britain. The result of the election on 6 May was a hung parliament. Brown was re-elected as MP for Kirkcaldy and Cowdenbeath with 29,559 votes.

=== 2010 government formation and resignation ===
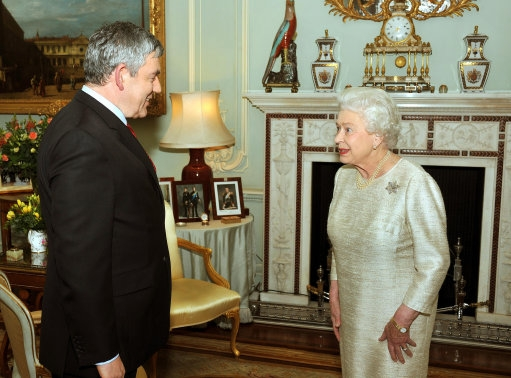
Brown tendering his resignation to Queen Elizabeth II at Buckingham Palace

Brown announced on 10 May 2010 that he would stand down as Labour Leader, with a view to a successor being chosen before the next Labour Party Conference in September 2010. The following day, negotiations between the Labour Party and the Liberal Democrats to form a coalition government failed, and a Conservative–Liberal Democrat coalition agreement was reached. During the evening, Brown visited Buckingham Palace to tender his resignation as prime minister to Queen Elizabeth II and to recommend that she invite the Leader of the Opposition, David Cameron, to form a government. He resigned as leader of the Labour Party with immediate effect.

== Post-premiership (2010–present) ==
=== Return to the backbenches (2010–2015) ===
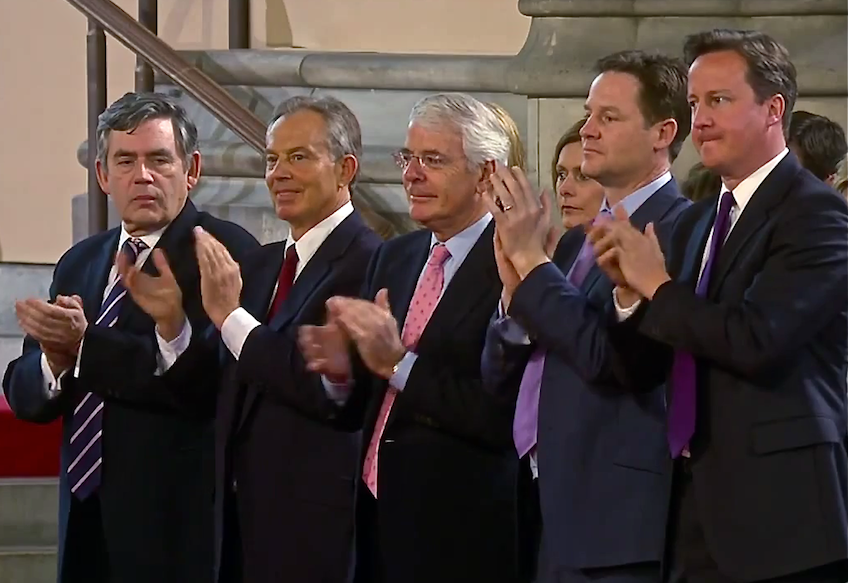
Brown with fellow former prime ministers Tony Blair and Sir John Major, Deputy Prime Minister Nick Clegg and Prime Minister David Cameron during U.S. president Barack Obama's address to Parliament

On 13 May 2010, in his first public appearance since leaving 10 Downing Street, two days after resigning as prime minister and Leader of the Labour Party, Brown confirmed he intended to stay on in Parliament, serving as a Labour backbencher, to serve the people of his Kirkcaldy and Cowdenbeath constituency. He continued to serve as the MP of Kirkcaldy and Cowdenbeath until 2015.

Towards the end of May 2010, Brown began writing Beyond the Crash, completing it after 14 weeks. The book discusses the 2008 financial crisis and Brown's recommendations for future co-ordinated global action.

He played a prominent role in the lead-up to, and the aftermath of, the 2014 Scottish independence referendum, campaigning for Scotland to stay in the United Kingdom. "Our vision for the future of Scotland – yes a Scottish parliament for fairness, battling for equality across the UK", he told voters in an impassioned speech on the eve of polling. "But our vision is bigger than that – at every point, particularly through our membership of the UK, to fight for what is our dream, what is our demand. A world not of a separate state, but a world of social justice people can believe in. What kind of message does Scotland send to the world if, tomorrow, we said we are going to give up on sharing, we are going to smash our partnership, we are going to abandon co-operation and we are going to throw the idea of solidarity into the dust. This is not the Scotland I know and recognise."

On 1 December 2014, Brown announced that he would not be seeking re-election to parliament. He stood down at the general election in May 2015.

=== IMF speculation ===
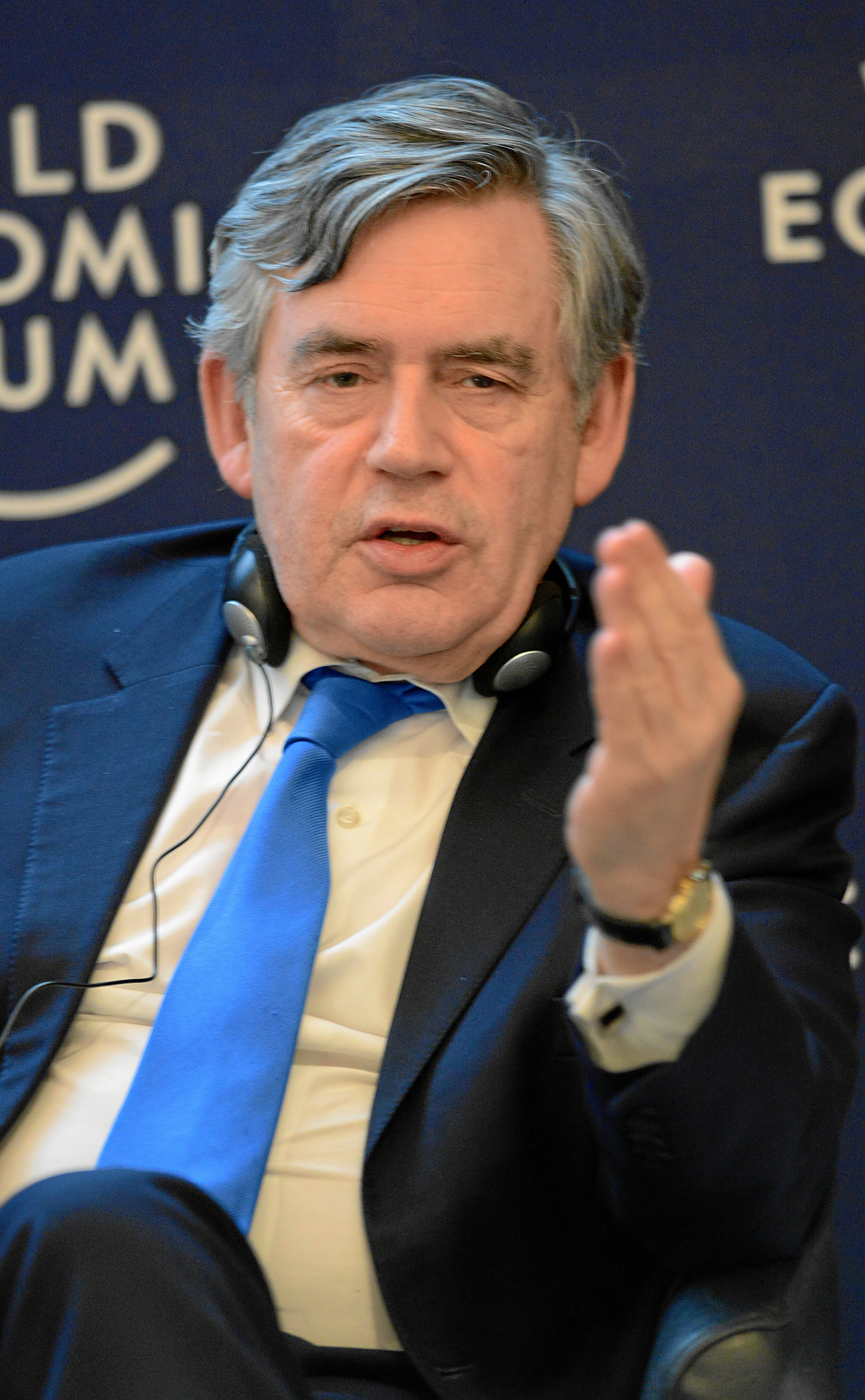
Brown, as UN Special Envoy for Global Education, addresses the World Economic Forum, January 2013

In April 2011, media reports linked Brown with the role of managing director of the International Monetary Fund following the scheduled retirement of Dominique Strauss-Kahn. Brown's successor and Leader of the Opposition, Ed Miliband, supported Brown for the role, while the prime minister, David Cameron, voiced opposition to this. Following the arrest of Strauss-Kahn for alleged sexual assault in May 2011, and his subsequent resignation, these reports re-surfaced. Support for Brown among economists was mixed but British Government backing for his candidature was not forthcoming and instead supported Christine Lagarde – the eventual successful candidate – for the post.

=== Submission to police of Epstein-related flight dossiers ===
In February 2026, in the fallout from the release of the Epstein files, Brown submitted multiple dossiers of evidence to multiple UK police forces investigating Jeffrey Epstein's "Lolita Express" flights in and out of the UK. Epstein's plane had landed at multiple airports in the UK, including at the Royal Air Force station, RAF Marham.

=== Other appointments ===
Sir Tim Berners-Lee, who had worked with the government during Brown's premiership to publish government data on the internet in the data.gov.uk project, invited Brown to become a board director of the World Wide Web Foundation to "advise the Web Foundation on ways to involve disadvantaged communities and global leaders in the development of sustainable programs that connect humanity and affect positive change", and he was elected to the board of directors in September 2010.

On 22 April 2011, it was announced that Brown would be taking on an unpaid advisory role at the World Economic Forum. Brown was also appointed as the inaugural 'Distinguished Leader in Residence' by New York University and took part in discussions and lectures relating to the 2008 financial crisis and globalisation.

In July 2012, Brown was named by Secretary-General Ban Ki-moon as United Nations Special Envoy for Global Education. He chaired the International Commission on Financing Global Education Opportunity from 2016, until it concluded in 2023 with the creation of the International Finance Facility for Education (IFFEd), for which he serves as Honorary President. Both positions are unpaid.

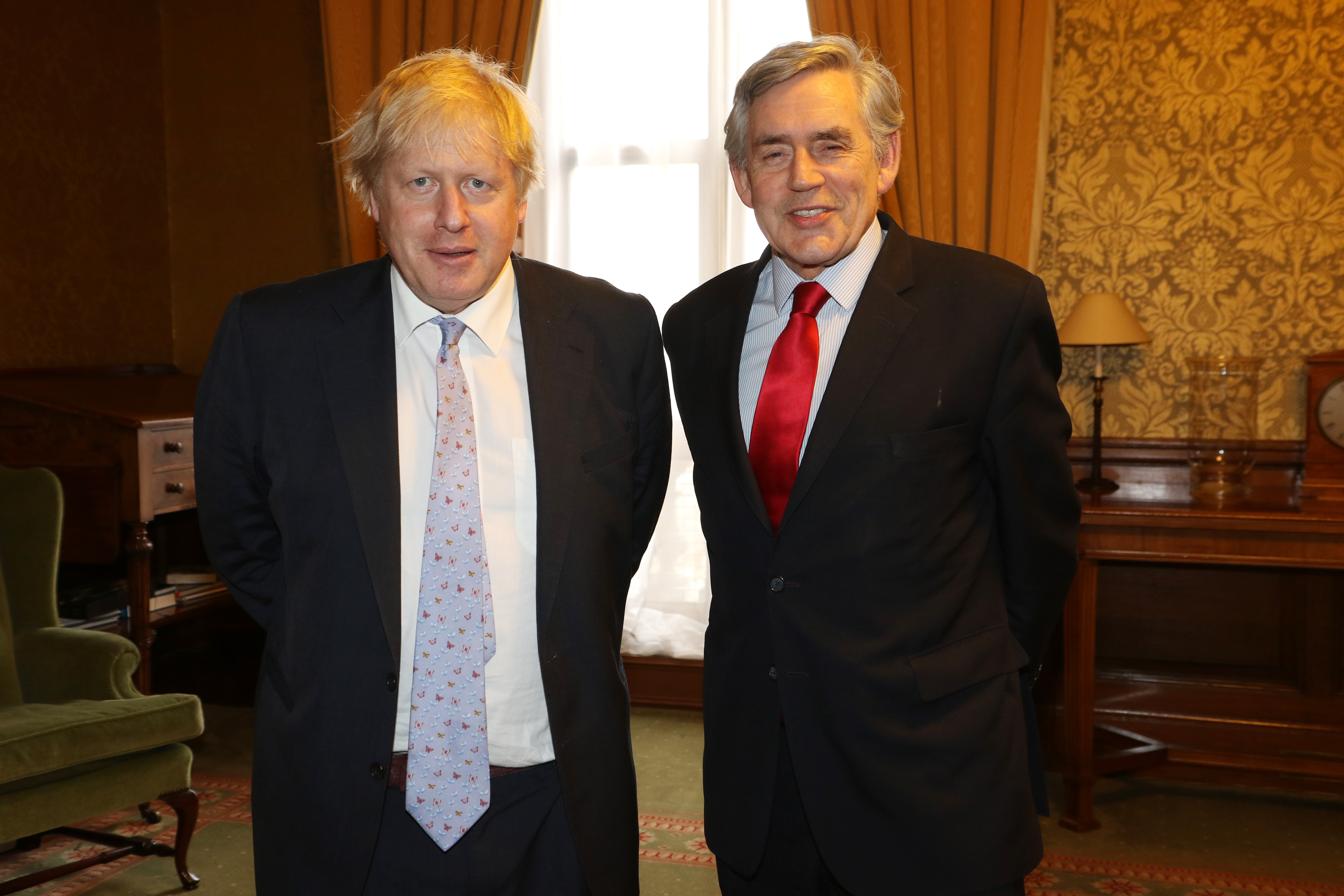
Brown with Foreign Secretary Boris Johnson, May 2018

In December 2015, Brown took his first large-scale role in the private sector since standing down as prime minister in 2010, becoming an advisor to PIMCO. Any money earned from the role is to go to the Gordon and Sarah Brown Foundation to support charitable work.

On 7 November 2017, Brown released his memoir My Life, Our Times.

In September 2020, Brown was a co-author of a letter to the journal Nature highlighting the importance of EU funding in the fight against COVID-19. The letter was organised by Scientists for Labour, an organisation of which he is a patron.

On 10 June 2021, Brown released the book Seven Ways to Change the World: How To Fix The Most Pressing Problems We Face. The book features Brown's forensic examination of seven areas where global reform and action are essential.

In September 2021, Brown was appointed by the World Health Organization as Goodwill Ambassador for Global Health Financing.

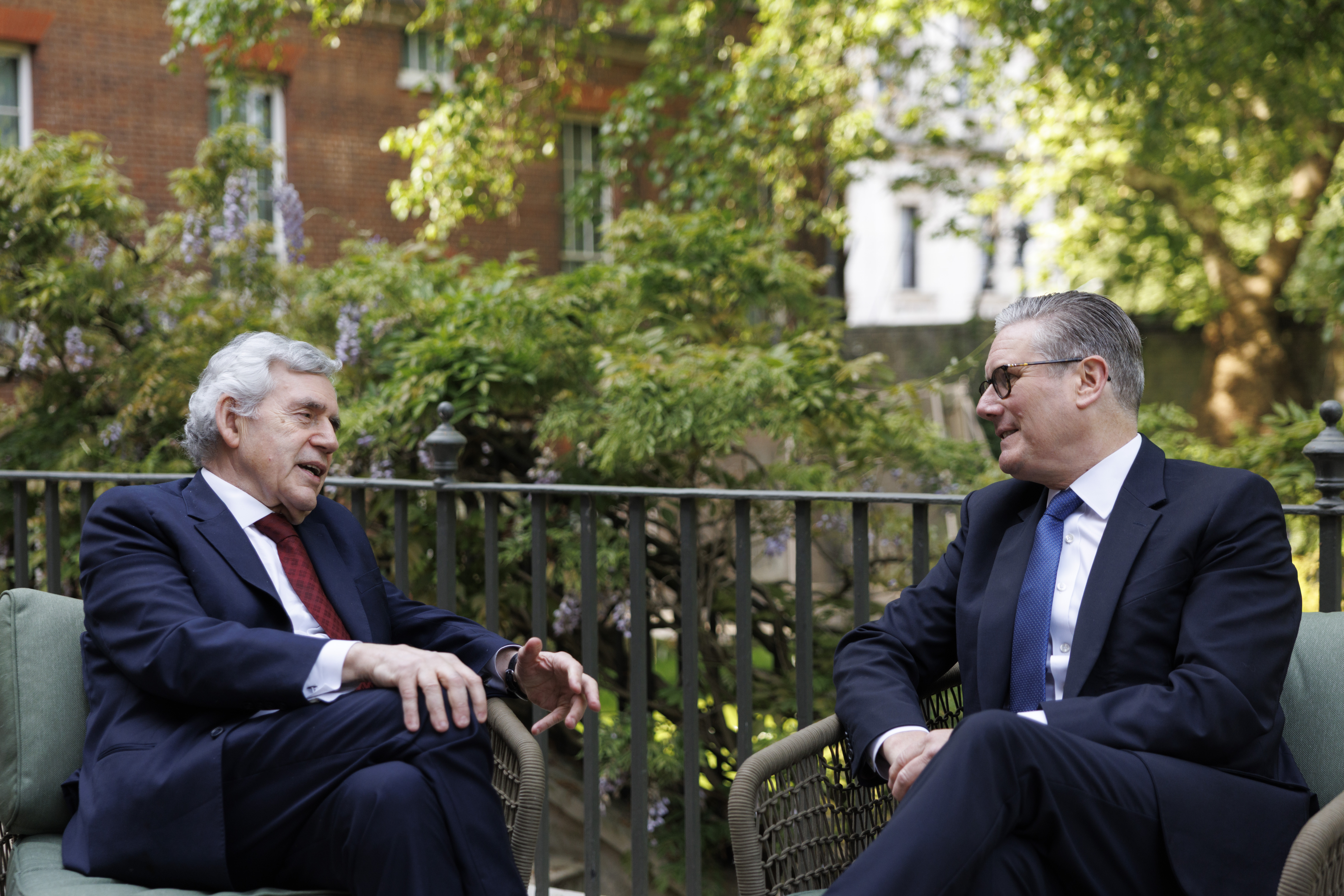
Brown with Prime Minister Keir Starmer, May 2026

On 5 December 2022, having led development of a Labour party blueprint on constitutional reform, Brown announced the publication of these proposals alongside future Labour prime minister Keir Starmer. These proposals included plans for the replacement of the House of Lords with an "Assembly of the Nations and Regions", electing around 200 members on a different electoral cycle to that of the House of Commons. Other measures include the "strengthening of the Sewel Convention" such that the ability of devolved administrations to veto UK Parliament legislation affecting devolved issues is "constitutionally protected", plans to grant the Scottish Parliament greater powers over foreign affairs "so that Scotland could sign up to international groups or agreements within devolved areas" such as Erasmus, and plans to transfer powers to English regions and local mayors. The proposals were criticised by the SNP who described them as "underwhelming", and the Speaker of the House of Commons Lindsay Hoyle who described plans to replace the Lords with an elected chamber as weakening the supremacy of the Commons. Following Labour's landslide victory in the 2024 general election, Brown congratulated Starmer on his victory, saying: "My best wishes to all the new Labour MPs and, above all, I congratulate the British people who have chosen not just change, but hope."

On 28 September 2023, Brown released the book Permacrisis: A Plan to Fix a Fractured World, which he co-wrote with Michael Spence and Mohamed A. El-Erian. In 2024 Brown co-authored a pamphlet on child poverty demanding a multibillion-pound package to solve what he dubbed 'a social crisis'.

In November 2024, Brown wrote an article in opposition to the Terminally Ill Adults (End of Life) Bill arguing that the UK needed to improve its palliative care provision instead of legalising assisted dying.

In May 2026, Brown was appointed as Keir Starmer's special envoy on global finance.

== Personal life ==
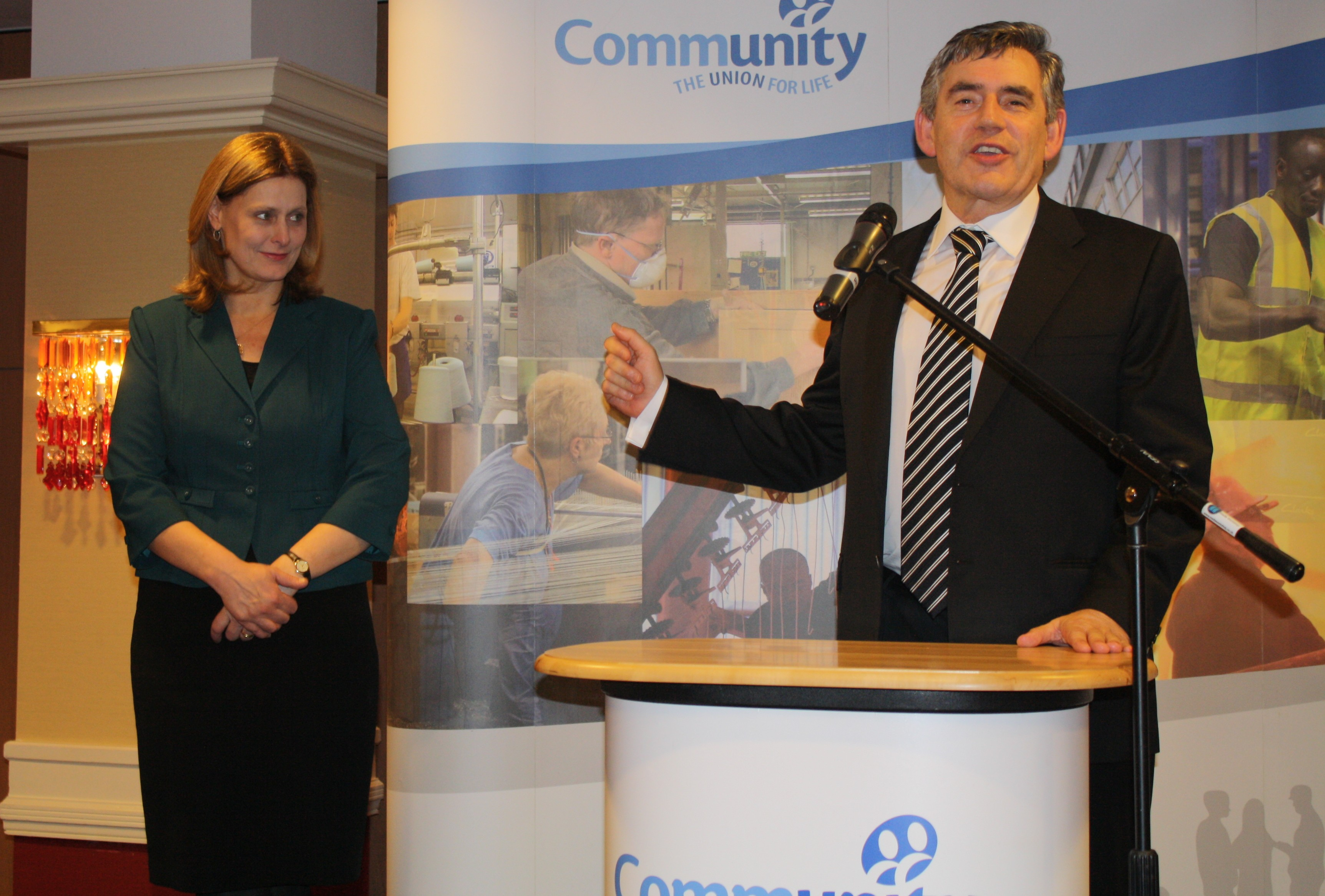
Sarah Brown attending one of her husband's speeches, September 2009

Brown's early girlfriends included journalist Sheena McDonald and Princess Margarita, the eldest daughter of exiled King Michael of Romania. At the age of 49, Brown married Sarah Macaulay in a private ceremony at his home in North Queensferry, Fife, on 3 August 2000. A daughter, Jennifer Jane, was born prematurely on 28 December 2001; she died on 7 January 2002, one day after experiencing a brain haemorrhage.

The couple have two sons, John Macaulay (born 17 October 2003) and (James) Fraser (born on 18 July 2006). In November 2006, Fraser was diagnosed with cystic fibrosis. The Sun had learned of the situation in 2006 and published the story. In 2011, Brown stated he had wanted the details of his son's condition kept private and that the publication had left him "in tears". The Sun said they approached Brown and that discussion occurred with his colleagues who provided quotes to use in the article.

Sarah Brown rarely made official appearances, whether with or without her husband. She is patron of several charities and has written articles for national newspapers related to this. At the 2008 Labour Party Conference, Sarah caused surprise by taking to the stage to introduce her husband for his keynote address. After that, her public profile increased.

Brown has two brothers, John Brown and Andrew Brown. Andrew has been Head of Media Relations in the UK for the French-owned utility company EDF Energy since 2004. Brown is also the brother-in-law of environmental journalist Clare Rewcastle Brown; he wrote a piece for The Independent supporting Clare's current environmental efforts on behalf of Sarawak.

While prime minister, Brown spent some of his spare time at Chequers, the house often being filled with friends. The Browns have entertained local dignitaries like Sir Leonard Figg. Brown is also a friend of Harry Potter author J. K. Rowling, who says of Brown: "I know him as affable, funny and gregarious, a great listener, a kind and loyal friend."

Brown is a supporter of the NHS, owing partly to both the experimental surgery that saved the sight in his right eye after his retina became detached, and the care he and Sarah Brown received when their premature firstborn baby died.

Brown is a supporter of Kirkcaldy-based football club Raith Rovers and has written articles about his relationship with the club.

=== Religion ===
A son of a Church of Scotland minister, Brown has talked about what he calls his "moral compass" and of his parents being his "inspiration". According to The Guardian, he is a member of the Church of Scotland.

== Depictions ==
The Deal, a 2003 television film, followed Tony Blair's rise to power, and his friendship and rivalry with Brown, played by David Morrissey. In The Trial of Tony Blair (2007), Brown was played by Peter Mullan, and in the Channel 4 television film Coalition (2015), he was portrayed by Ian Grieve.

== Honours ==
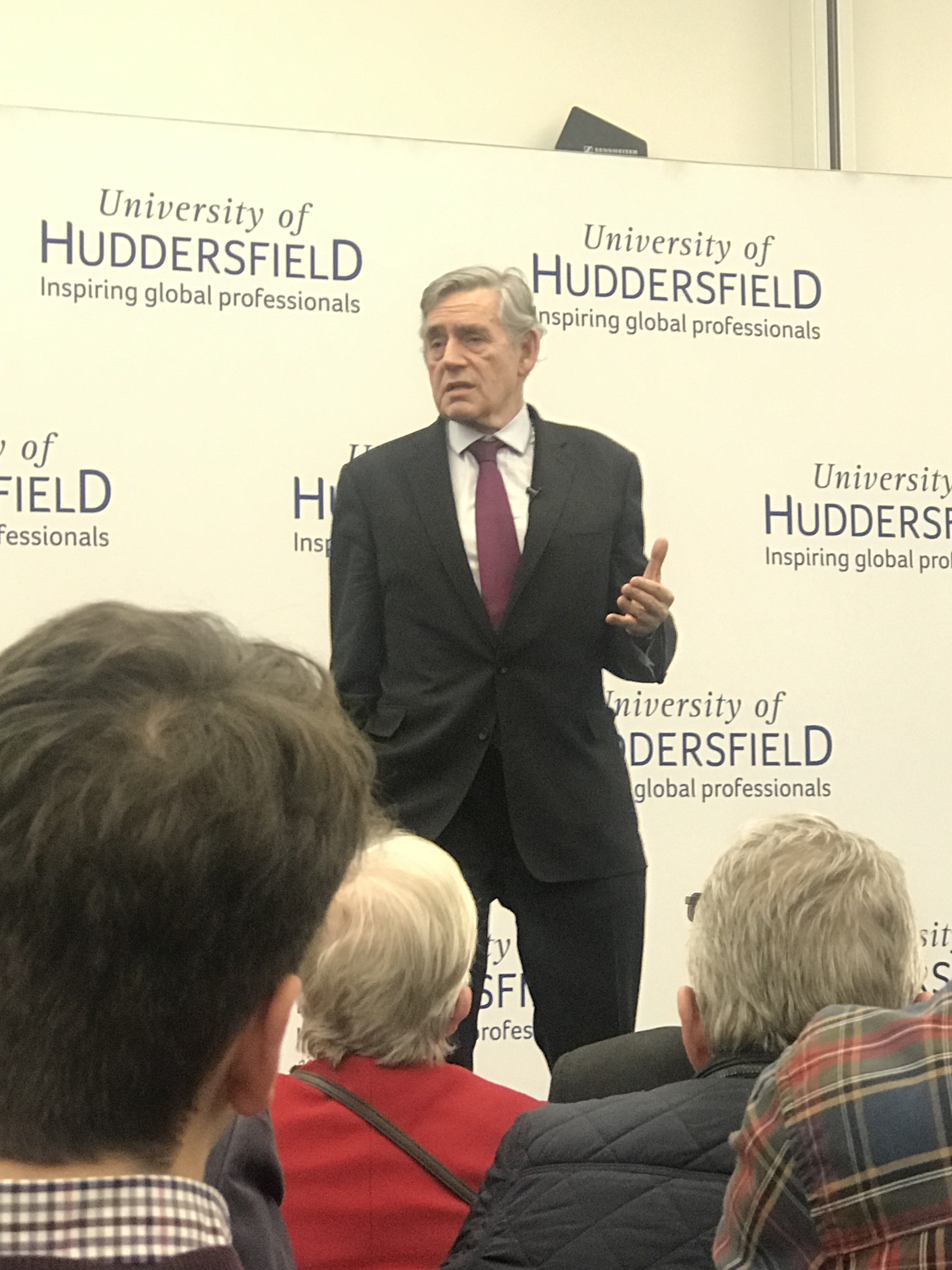
Brown delivers the Harold Wilson memorial lecture at the University of Huddersfield in 2018

- Doctor of the University (DUniv) from Brunel University (1996)
- Doctor Honoris Causa (HonDr) from University of Edinburgh (2003)
- Honorary Doctor of Laws (LLD) from Robert Gordon University (2003)
- Honorary Doctor of Humane Letters (DHL) from New York University (2005)
- Honorary Doctor of Civil Law (DCL) from Newcastle University (2007)
- Honorary Doctor of Letters (DLitt) from University of Delhi (2008)
- Doctor of the University (DUniv) from University of Glasgow (2015)
- Elected an Honorary Fellow of the Royal Society of Edinburgh (HonFRSE; 2018)

In March 2009, Brown was named World Statesman of the Year by the Appeal of Conscience Foundation, an American organisation 'dedicated to promoting peace, human rights and understanding between religious faiths'. The award was presented by Rabbi Arthur Schneier who praised Brown's "compassionate leadership in dealing with the challenging issues facing humanity, his commitment to freedom, human dignity and the environment, and for the major role he has played in helping to stabilise the world's financial system".

Brown has, on six occasions, been honoured in the Scottish Politician of the Year awards organised by The Herald newspaper. In 1999, 2000, 2007 and 2014, he won the award in the Best Scot at Westminster category. He won the Lifetime Achievement Award/Outstanding Political Achievement category in 2011. And in 2020, he was designated "best of the best" in the Best Scot at Westminster category.

In the 2024 Birthday Honours, Brown was appointed Member of the Order of the Companions of Honour (CH) for public and charitable services in the UK and abroad.

== Publications ==
- Brown, Gordon, ed. (1975). The Red Paper on Scotland. Edinburgh: EUSPB. ISBN 0-9501890-73.
- Drucker, H. M.; Brown, Gordon (1980). The Politics of Nationalism and Devolution. London: Longman. ISBN 9780582295209.
- The Labour Party and Political Change in Scotland 1918–1929: The Politics of Five Elections (PhD). Edinburgh: University of Edinburgh. 1982. hdl:1842/7136.
- Maxton: A Biography. Mainstream. 1986. ISBN 978-1-85158-042-2.
- Brown, Gordon; Cook, Robin, eds. (1987). Scotland: The Real Divide. Mainstream Publishing. ISBN 978-0-906391-18-1.
- Where There's Greed: Margaret Thatcher and the Betrayal of Britain's Future. Mainstream. 1989. ISBN 978-1-85158-228-0.
- Brown, Gordon; Naughtie, James (1994). John Smith: Life and Soul of the Party. Edinburgh: Mainstream. ISBN 1-85158-692-X.
- Brown, Gordon; Wright, Tony, eds. (1995). Values, Visions and Voices: An Anthology of Socialism. Mainstream. ISBN 978-1-85158-731-5.
- Moving Britain Forward: selected speeches, 1997-2006. London: Bloomsbury. 2006. ISBN 9780747588382.
- Courage: Eight Portraits. Bloomsbury. 2007. ISBN 978-0-7475-6532-1.
- Britain's Everyday Heroes. Mainstream. 2007. ISBN 978-1-84596-307-1.
- Wartime Courage: stories of extraordinary courage by exceptional men and women in World War Two. London: Bloomsbury. 2009. ISBN 9780747597414.
- The Change We Choose: Speeches 2007–2009. Mainstream. 2010. ISBN 978-1-84596-632-4.
- Beyond the Crash: Overcoming the First Crisis of Globalisation. Simon & Schuster. 2010.
- Brown, Gordon; Harvie, Chris (May 2015) [1979]. A Voter's Guide to the Scottish Assembly. David Watt & Sons.
- Britain: Leading, Not Leaving: the patriotic case for remaining in Europe. Selkirk, UK: Deerpark Press. 2016. ISBN 9780954197964.
- My Life, Our Times. The Bodley Head. 2017. ISBN 978-1-84792-497-1.
- Seven Ways to Change the World: How To Fix The Most Pressing Problems We Face. [S.l.]: Simon & Schuster. 2021. ISBN 978-1-3985-0361-8. OCLC 1223012333.
- Brown, Gordon; El-Erian, Mohamed; Spence, Michael (2023). Permacrisis: A Plan to Fix a Fractured World. Simon & Schuster. ISBN 978-1-3985-2561-0.
- Brown, Gordon (1 September 2026). The Future Starts With Us. Simon & Schuster. ISBN 978-1-3985-1418-8.

== See also ==
- Brownism

== Notes ==
Academic offices
Preceded by Jonathan Wills	Rector of the University of Edinburgh; 1973–1976	Succeeded by Magnus Magnusson
Parliament of the United Kingdom
New constituency	Member of Parliament for Dunfermline East; 1983–2005	Constituency abolished
New constituency	Member of Parliament for Kirkcaldy and Cowdenbeath; 2005–2015	Succeeded by Roger Mullin
Political offices
Preceded by Bryan Gould	Shadow Chief Secretary to the Treasury; 1987–1989	Succeeded by Margaret Beckett
Preceded by Bryan Gould	Shadow Secretary of State for Trade and Industry; 1989–1992	Succeeded by Robin Cook
Preceded by Bryan Gould	Shadow President of the Board of Trade; 1989–1992	Succeeded by Robin Cook
Preceded by John Smith	Shadow Chancellor of the Exchequer; 1992–1997	Succeeded by Kenneth Clarke
Preceded by Kenneth Clarke	Chancellor of the Exchequer; 1997–2007	Succeeded by Alistair Darling
Preceded by Kenneth Clarke	Second Lord of the Treasury; 1997–2007	Succeeded by Alistair Darling
Preceded by Tony Blair	Prime Minister of the United Kingdom; 2007–2010	Succeeded by David Cameron
Preceded by Tony Blair	First Lord of the Treasury; 2007–2010	Succeeded by David Cameron
Preceded by Tony Blair	Minister for the Civil Service; 2007–2010	Succeeded by David Cameron
Party political offices
Preceded by Tony Blair	Leader of the Labour Party; 2007–2010	Succeeded by Ed Miliband
Diplomatic posts
Preceded by George W. Bush	Chairperson of the Group of 20; 2009	Succeeded by Barack Obama
Orders of precedence in the United Kingdom
Preceded by David Heathcoat-Amory as Privy Counsellor	Gentlemen; Privy Counsellor (sworn June 1996)	Succeeded by David Curry as Privy Counsellor
