= 1998 United Kingdom budget =

- Presented: 17 March 1998
- Country: United Kingdom
- Parliament: 52nd
- Party: Labour Party
- Chancellor: Gordon Brown

The 1998 United Kingdom budget (sometimes referred to as the Prudence with a purpose budget and officially titled New Ambitions for Britain) was delivered by Gordon Brown, the Chancellor of the Exchequer, to the House of Commons on 17 March 1998. It was the second budget to be presented by Brown following Labour's 1997 general election win, and sought to maintain the broad public support given to Labour in 1997 by announcing measures that would appeal to those who had voted the party into office. One of the key features of the 1998 budget was the Working Families Tax Credit, a benefit that could be claimed by families on low income. Brown also announced tax cuts for businesses, the launch of a £50m (Note: about £94bn at 2021 prices) rural transport fund, and committed to taxing child benefit at a future date.

== Overview ==
Titled New Ambitions for Britain, and with "prudence as a purpose" as its narrative, Brown's 1998 budget sought to strike a careful balance between maintaining Labour's broad appeal among the Middle England demographic who had voted for the party the previous year, thus helping Tony Blair to become prime minister, while offering help to those on low incomes. His statement set out to achieve four objectives—stability, enterprise, welfare reform and strong public services. He told the House of Commons: "For decades, under Governments of both parties, the great economic strengths of our country have been undermined by deep-seated structural weaknesses—instability, under-investment, unemployment." He hoped to address this with a long-term plan for economic growth and success.

He reported that the five-year plan to reduce the UK's deficit announced in his 1997 budget was being achieved at a faster rate than had been forecast, with the UK national debt having come down by £17bn, (Note: about £32bn at 2021 prices) or 2% of national income, since July 1997. He expressed a need for caution, and said that he would "lock in this fiscal tightening" for 1998–99. As a consequence, borrowing, which the previous government had planned to be £19bn (Note: about £36bn at 2021 prices) for 1998, was now forecast to be £5bn (Note: about £9bn at 2021 prices) for 1998, a little under £4bn (Note: about £7bn at 2021 prices) for 1999, and was expected to be in balance by 2000. On economic growth, Brown said it was dependent on "what happens to wage inflation over the coming year. It would be the worst of short-termism to pay ourselves more today at the cost of higher interest rates, fewer jobs and slower growth tomorrow. All of us must therefore show greater responsibility." He suggested wage inflation would slow growth from 2.5% to 2% in 1998, and similarly predicted percentage figures of between one and three quarters and two and a quarter for 1999, and between two and a quarter and two and three quarters for 2000. "

=== Key points ===
- Advance Corporation Tax abolished from April 1999
- Corporation Tax for larger companies cut by 1% to 30% from April 1999; corporation tax can also be paid in instalments
- Capital gains tax for investors holding non-business assets who invest for 10 years cut from 40% to 24%
- Capital Gains Tax for business investment cut from 40% to 10%
- First year capital allowances for small and medium companies set at 40%
- Landfill tax rises from £7 to £10 per tonne
- Inheritance tax threshold rises £8,000 to £222,000
- No limit on the amount people can transfer into new Individual savings accounts (ISAs) from existing tax-free accounts, such as PEPs and TESSAs
- A proposed £50,000 limit on ISAs is scrapped
- The limit of cash holding for the first year of ISAs is raised to £3,000
- Employers' National Insurance scrapped on earnings below £81 a week from April 1999
- A starting rate of income tax at 10p will be introduced "when the time is right to do so"
- A new tax credit for working people with disabilities starting in October 1999
- Stamp duty raised to 2% for properties above £250,000 and 3% for those above £500,000
- No changes to mortgage relief (MIRAS)
- An additional £500m (Note: about £936m at 2021 prices) for the National Health Service, £250m for education and £500m for public transport over three years
- £50m made available to universities through a venture capital fund
- A £50m fund to improve rural transport
- A guaranteed income of at least £180 a week for families where at least one member works full time, and a guarantee they will pay no income tax on earnings below £220 a week
- Married couples' tax allowance reduced from 15% to 10% to fund a 20% (£2.50 a week) increase in child benefit for first child in a family
- A commitment to taxing child benefit at a future date
- Duty on beer rises by 1p a pint, on wine by 4p a bottle, and by 20p on a packet of cigarettes, but is unchanged on spirits
- Unleaded petrol rises by 4.4p a litre, while leaded petrol increases by 4.9p a litre, and diesel rises by 5.5p a litre
- Road tax is frozen at £150, but reduced by £50 for smaller, cleaner cars

== Reaction ==
While welcoming some aspects of the budget, notably measures to cut National Insurance and the help offered to small businesses, William Hague, leader of the Conservative Party, described many of the announcements as a betrayal of Britain. In particular, he cited the increase in fuel duty which would impact rural areas, and the announcement of future plans to tax child benefit which would have an impact on women and children. He also said it was now clear the government was not on the side of "the family that works hard and saves hard and tries to be independent of the state", and criticised delays in launching the 10p tax rate, which had been one of Labour's 1997 election manifesto pledges. Paddy Ashdown, leader of the Liberal Democrats, gave the statement a much more positive reception, saying that in the long-term it could turn out to have been "rather good", but he criticised the government's over-reliance on inflation to control the UK economy and said not enough had been done to correct several years of under-funding of public services. Similar concerns were also raised by Ed Davey, a Liberal Democrat Treasury spokesman, who felt investment in public services had been overlooked, and described it as "a disappointment". But he welcomed the announcement on National Insurance. Iain Duncan Smith, the Shadow Secretary of State for Social Security, claimed the budget was "a devastating Budget for families". Giles Radice, chairman of the House of Commons Treasury Committee and himself a Labour MP, welcomed the spending announced for education and health, but said the budget maintained Brown's reputation as an Iron Chancellor. Unison, one of the UK's largest trade unions, described the 1998 budget as "hard-edged with some compassion".

Following the budget, Pound sterling rose to its highest level since 1989, prompting Evan Davis of BBC News to describe the statement as one "that largely ignored the macroeconomic fine-tuning of some predecessors" with consequences that "the markets take over, read it as too lax, assume interest rates have to rise, and send the pound to a nine year, unsustainable high". Making reference to the "prudence with a purpose" theme, Paul Rowley, the BBC's Political Correspondent, suggested the budget had one purpose, "to win the next election. The delivery and language may have had the imprint of a dour Scot balancing the household finances. But there was the clear hand of the Prime Minister in what was a Downing Street co-production. Brown contributed the economics. Blair added the political nous".
