= 1979 United Kingdom budget =

1979 United Kingdom budget may refer to:

- April 1979 United Kingdom budget
- June 1979 United Kingdom budget
