= 1997 United Kingdom budget =

- Presented: 2 July 1997
- Parliament: 52nd
- Party: Labour Party
- Chancellor: Gordon Brown

The 1997 United Kingdom budget (officially titled Equipping Britain for our Long-Term Future) was delivered by Gordon Brown, the Chancellor of the Exchequer, to the House of Commons on 2 July 1997. It was the first budget to be presented by Brown during his tenure as Chancellor, and the first Labour budget to be presented since April 1979. The 1997 budget marked a significant change of direction in economic policy following Labour's election win in May 1997. Among the measures announced were a five-year plan to reduce the budget deficit, a £5.2bn (Note: about £10bn at 2021 prices) windfall tax on recently privatised utilities which was to fund Labour's planned Welfare to Work scheme, and a reduction in VAT on fuel. The budget was welcomed by business, which viewed it as fiscally responsible, but it was greeted less warmly by the UK's utility providers.

== Background ==
The budget was to be the first presented by a Labour Government since April 1979. Gordon Brown announced plans to hold a budget on 10 June 1997 following Labour's victory in that year's general election, but was forced to revise that date after British Telecom threatened legal action over his plans to announce a windfall tax on privatised utility companies. The budget was eventually held on 2 July. Before then and following consultation with the National Audit Office, on 18 June, Brown announced a change in the assumption the Treasury used to calculate its economic forecasts, creating a more negative outlook for the UK economy than had been forecast by his predecessor, Kenneth Clarke in his final budget of November 1996. Chiefly, under the new calculation, the public sector borrowing requirement appeared to be £0.5bn higher for 1997, (Note: about £1bn at 2021 prices) and £3.25bn (Note: about £6bn at 2021 prices) higher for 1998, than Clarke had estimated.

One of Brown's first acts as Chancellor was to grant the Bank of England the freedom to set the UK's interest rate, a decision that had previously been the responsibility of the Chancellor. Breaking with tradition, Brown also commissioned a new budget box which was made by four young apprentices from his Dunfermline constituency, who he then invited to join him on Budget Day at 11 Downing Street. Another break with tradition saw the budget held on a Wednesday, a day that had started to become an important one for Parliamentary business, with Prime Minister's Questions having also moved to a Wednesday following Labour's election.

== Overview ==
In his budget speech, which he described as a "people's budget", Brown told the House of Commons the government was spending more on debt than education, and set a five-year target to reduce the public deficit, while also announcing that the government would only borrow to invest and public debt would be held at a "prudent and stable level over the economic cycle". He set the underlying public sector borrowing requirement at £13.25bn for 1997–98, and £5.5bn for 1998–99. It was forecast that GDP would rise by 3.25% in 1997 and 2.5% in 1998, and consumer spending would increase by 4.5% in 1997 and 4% in 1998. Economic growth was forecast to be 2.5% for 1998, while inflation would rise by 2.5% in 1997, 2.75% in 1998, and 2.5% in 1999.

=== Key points ===
- Corporation tax cut by 2% to 31% (backdated to April 1997)
- Corporation tax for small and medium-sized businesses cut by 2% to 21% (backdated to April 1997)
- Capital allowance on plant and machinery doubled for one year for small and medium-sized businesses
- Tax credits scrapped for pension funds and companies, but payments will continue to holders of PEPs, non-taxpayers and charities until April 1999
- Foreign income dividends scheme scrapped from April 1999
- £5.2bn windfall tax to be levied on privatised utility companies, the bulk of it to fund welfare to work programme, with some to be spent on schools, particularly infrastructure and equipment; tax will be made up from £2.1bn (Note: about £4bn at 2021 prices) from electricity, £1.65bn (Note: about £3bn at 2021 prices) from water and £1.45 (Note: about £3bn at 2021 prices) billion from others, and paid in two instalments
- Spending on health is expected to increase by 2.25% during 1998
- An additional £1.2bn (Note: about £2bn at 2021 prices) allocated from reserves for healthcare during 1998–99
- An additional £1bn (Note: about £2bn at 2021 prices) allocated for schools from reserves, with £1.3bn to be allocated over five years
- Abolition of tax relief on private health insurance for over-60s
- VAT on fuel cut from 8% to 5% from 1 September 1997, offset by end of over-60s private health insurance tax relief
- Gas levy scrapped, offset by £400m (Note: about £774m at 2021 prices) from windfall tax
- An immediate rise in stamp duty from 0.5% to 1.5% on homes above £250,000, as well as a 2% rise on homes over £500,000
- Mortgage Interest Tax Relief cut to 10% from April 1998
- Phased release of capital receipts from council house sales
- £200m (Note: about £387m at 2021 prices) from windfall tax allocated to childcare and training
- Help with childcare costs for single parents
- 50,000 young people to be trained as childcare assistants over five years
- Money from the National Lottery to be used for after-school clubs
- Creation of Individual savings accounts with tax relief from April 1999
- An increase of 4p per litre on petrol from the following day
- Road tax to increase to £150
- Duties on beer, wine and spirits to rise in line with inflation from January 1998
- A rise of 19p on a pack of 20 cigarettes from 1 December 1997

On the subject of VAT on fuel, Brown expressed his wish to remove it altogether, but said he was prevented from doing so: "I would like to abolish VAT on fuel, but European rules prevent me from doing so. Therefore, VAT will be cut to the lowest level compatible with European law—5 per cent.—on 1 September, well in advance of winter fuel bills." He also confirmed his next budget would take place in Spring 1998.

== Reaction ==
On 3 July, Pound sterling reached its highest level since 1991, reaching DM2.95, its old central parity in the European Exchange Rate Mechanism. In response, Brown said that he had taken tough decisions in order to help to control interest rates. The Bank of England's Monetary Policy Committee raised the interest by 0.125% at a meeting the following week.

The 1997 budget was broadly welcomed by business, which viewed it as fiscally sensible, but some sectors, notably utility companies and pension funds, gave it a less positive reception. In particular, pension funds operated by local authorities voiced concern about their shareholders losing tax relief on dividends. The City of London also expressed its dismay that Brown had not done enough to curb the consumer spending boom, and argued for tax increases, something that Gavyn Davies, chief economist at Goldman Sachs suggested would cost around £9bn. The Liberal Democrats suggested Brown's upwards revision of the inflation forecasts were a precursor to tighter limits on public spending. Writing for The Independent on 10 July, Donald Macintyre observed: "Quite a few economic analysts have found it impossible to resist the temptation to utter that hoary old truism, that budgets which look good on the day usually turn sour a couple of weeks later", but concluded that Brown had succeeded in end the short-term economic view of his predecessors, and "still looks as tough and populist as he did on 2 July".
