= 1996 United Kingdom budget =

- Presented: 26 November 1996
- Parliament: 51st
- Party: Conservative Party
- Chancellor: Kenneth Clarke

The 1996 United Kingdom budget (officially titled A budget for lasting prosperity) was delivered by Kenneth Clarke, the Chancellor of the Exchequer, to the House of Commons on 26 November 1996. It was Clarke's fourth budget, the last to be delivered during his tenure as chancellor, the last budget to be presented by the Conservative government of John Major before the party was defeated by Labour in the 1997 general election, and it was the last fully Conservative budget until July 2015. Prior to Clarke's budget statement being presented to the House of Commons, its contents were leaked to the Daily Mirror, which returned the document to the government but decided to print some of the details, thus helping Tony Blair, then the leader of the Opposition, to prepare his response. Clarke described his statement as one that outlined a "Rolls-Royce recovery – built to last" and predicted economic growth of 2.5% for 1997 and 3.5% for 1998, but Blair dismissed it as "a last-gasp budget of a government whose time is up".

== Background ==
The 1996 budget was set against the backdrop of an economy that had largely recovered from the recession of the early 1990s, but the Conservative Party, which had been in power for 17 years, was in difficulty, with opinion polls showing them an average of 25 points behind the opposition Labour Party. With an election needing to be held by May 1997, and with Labour widely predicted to win, Clarke had urged the 1996 Conservative Party Conference that the party could still win the election if it focused on its economic record.

On the evening of 25 November 1996, the day before the budget was scheduled to be presented to Parliament, a number of documents relating to it were leaked to the Daily Mirror from an undisclosed source. In a 1997 article the BBC described the leak as consisting of 36 documents, mainly press releases to be issued once the statement had been outlined in the House of Commons, while in 2011, Jill Rutter, a former press secretary at HM Treasury, described the documents as "a leaked copy of the Chancellor's budget speech". Having become aware of the leak, 10 Downing Street sought an injunction to prevent the newspaper from publishing the document, and considered sending Clarke to the House of Commons that evening to make his statement. But according to Rutter, "We looked at the content, concluded there was nothing market moving, and Ken Clarke decided to go out for a curry with his Private Office". Piers Morgan, who was editor of The Mirror at the time, took the decision to return the documents to the government, saying he had "a public duty to return such sensitive documents". But the 26 November edition of the newspaper did publish some details of what would be included in that day's budget.

Clarke would make reference to the incident in the opening words of his statement: "Contrary to popular belief, I always look at the mirror in the morning. I am reasonably well prepared for this occasion and I am about to deliver the real Budget statement. I think this is positively my last appearance in the House in a speaking capacity this week, or so at the moment I expect it to be."

== Overview ==
The 1996 budget was Kenneth Clarke's fourth budget, and would be the last to be presented before the 1997 general election. With the election in mind, and the UK having emerged from the Early 1990s recession, he was keen to produce a budget that would please both the public and industry, while taking a long-term approach to economic recovery. The statement, titled A budget for lasting prosperity, was described by Clarke as outlining a "Rolls-Royce recovery – built to last". He predicted economic growth of 2.5% for 1997 and 3.5% for 1998, and said that the UK had outgrown both France and Germany over a five-year period for the first time in half a century. Unemployment, which had fallen by a million over five years, was forecast to fall below two million, half the number of unemployed in Germany. Unemployment was also rising in France and Germany, something Clarke attributed to a minimum wage, something the UK did not have at the time. Underlying inflation stood at 3% in October 1996, but was described as being on course to fall to the government's target of 2.5% or less, with producer price inflation at its lowest since the 1960s. Consumer spending, which Clarke said had been increasing throughout the year, was forecast to be 3% by the end of 1996–97 and 4% in 1997–98. Business investment for the year had grown to 6% by November 1996, and was expected to be 10% for 1997–98. UK exports had collectively grown by 20% for 1995–96 (7% for 1996), and was predicted to increase by 6% during 1997–98.

The public sector borrowing requirement (PSBR) had fallen significantly since 1993, and was forecast to be £26.5bn (Note: about £53bn at 2021 prices) for 1997–98, meaning "it has halved as a share of GDP over the past three years". It was further predicted to reduce to £19bn (Note: about £38bn at 2021 prices) in 1998–99, and be in balance by 1999–2000. Clarke said that the government's target to set public spending at 40% of national income was on target to be met during 1998–99, with public spending £24bn (Note: about £48bn at 2021 prices) lower than 1993 projections. Public spending would also be reduced by a further £7bn (Note: about £14bn at 2021 prices) over the coming three years. Clarke maintained that without the reduction in public spending the Conservative Government had implemented since the 1980s, the Treasury would have needed to raise an extra £2,300 (Note: about £4593 at 2021 prices) per household in annual tax revenue.

There were calls from within the Conservative Party to announce a 2p cut in income tax as an incentive for potential voters ahead of the election, and although Clarke resisted the advice, he did make some changes to the basic income tax rate: "This isn't a budget just for the next few months, it's a budget for many prosperous years to come and it's a budget that the Conservative Government will build upon again in 12 months time." Along with a 1p reduction in the basic rate of income tax which meant "the basic rate of tax is a full 10p lower than the rate we inherited in 1979", Clarke announced that the lowest tax band would be widened by £200 and the basic personal allowance increased by £280 to £4,045. The married couples' tax allowance was also increased by £40 "so the system does recognise marriage". An extra £1.6bn (Note: about £3bn at 2021 prices) in spending was pledged to the health service, with £830m for schools. Amid public concern about the availability of alcoholic soft drinks, known as alcopops, to under-age drinkers, excise duty on the drinks was increased by 40% from 1 January 1997, adding an average of 7–8p to the price per bottle: "That increase will meet public concern about the attraction of the 'alcopops' for under-age drinkers, but it will also attack a distortion of competition by bringing the tax broadly into line with that on beer."

=== Key points ===
- Basic rate of income tax reduced by 1p to 23p
- Personal tax allowance increased by £280
- 40p tax threshold expanded by £600
- 20p tax band widened by £200
- Inheritance tax threshold raised to £215,000
- Capital gains tax thresholds to be indexed from April 1997
- Small companies' rate of Corporation Tax reduced to 23%
- No increase in the business rate of tax for small businesses
- Proposed rise in insurance premium tax to 4%
- Spending on National Health Service patient services to increase by £1.6bn in 1997
- £450m (Note: about £899m at 2021 prices) to be spent on combating crime in 1997, providing 2,000 new police officers by the end of the year
- Spending on schools to increase by £830m (Note: about £1657m at 2021 prices) in 1997
- Capital investment of £50m (Note: about £100m at 2021 prices) for school buildings
- £280m (Note: about £399m at 2021 prices) for further and higher education during 1997–98
- Low-cost rented housing budgets to be reduced by £500m
- Extra social security benefits for lone parents to be phased out from 1998
- Cost of a car tax disc to rise by £5 to £145
- Lorry tax disc unchanged
- Petrol and Diesel raised by 3p a litre
- Air Passenger Duty rates increased from £5 to £10 on European flights, and from £10 to £20 on flights to the rest of the world
- Duty on spirits reduced by 26p a bottle
- Duty on beer and wine unchanged
- Duty on alcopops raised by 7-8p a bottle
- Duty on cigars increased by 7p a packet
- Duty on cigarettes increased by 15p a packet

== Reaction ==
The document leak enabled leader of the Labour Party and the Opposition, Tony Blair, to prepare his budget response in advance. He dismissed the statement as "a last-gasp budget of a government whose time is up" and "all smoke and mirrors", declaring that "Just like a Conservative government" Clarke was "giving with one hand to take away with the other". In response to the income tax reduction he highlighted what he described as "22 Tory tax-rises" since 1979, an argument he used during his campaign for the 1997 general election.

Away from politics, the budget was well received, both by the public and business. The BBC has noted of the 1996 budget, "Mr Clarke's budget managed to please both the public and the City without rocking the boat of economic recovery. Although, he said, he was unable to play Santa Claus, he was not going to play Scrooge."

== Subsequent events ==
Prime Minister John Major ordered a police inquiry into the document leak, but the Metropolitan Police Service took no action, and the source of the leak remained undiscovered. In 2011, the Treasury started to pre-brief the media of budget content.

The following budget, delivered in July 1997 by Clarke's successor, Gordon Brown, saw a change in the assumption the Treasury used to calculate its economic forecasts, creating a more negative outlook for the UK economy than had been forecast by Clarke.
