= 2022 United Kingdom budget =

2022 United Kingdom budget may refer to:

- September 2022 United Kingdom mini-budget, held on 23 September 2022
- November 2022 United Kingdom autumn statement, held on 17 November 2022
