= April 1979 United Kingdom budget =

1979 United Kingdom budget
- Presented: 3 April 1979
- Parliament: 47th
- Party: Labour Party
- Chancellor: Denis Healey

The April 1979 United Kingdom budget was delivered by Denis Healey, the Chancellor of the Exchequer, to the House of Commons on 3 April 1979. It was the first of two budgets to be presented to Parliament in 1979, and the last to be presented by Healey and the Labour Government of James Callaghan. It was also the last Labour budget to be presented until 1997.

Described as a caretaker budget, it was introduced after Callaghan's government had lost a vote of no confidence the previous month, and was designed to facilitate the continued raising of taxes until an election could be held to choose a new government, which would then outline a new budget. Among the measures announced were an increase in all income tax personal allowances by 8.9%, which was in line with inflation at the time, the abolition of child tax allowance, and a rise in child benefit to £4.00 per week. In his response to the budget, Shadow Chancellor Geoffrey Howe said Healey "will have left a dreadful inheritance for the next chancellor".

The budget was supported by the Conservative Party led by Margaret Thatcher, which went on to win the 1979 general election a few weeks later. Howe, who had served as Shadow Chancellor since 1975, and became Chancellor in the first government of Margaret Thatcher, then delivered a new budget to Parliament on 12 June.
