= Social care cap =

Previous proposed reform to social care funding in England

The social care cap was a proposed reform to the funding of social care in England. Under the proposals, no one would have to spend more than £86,000 on their personal care over their lifetime. The cap would apply irrespective of a person’s age or income. In July 2024, Rachel Reeves, the Chancellor of the Exchequer, announced that the reforms would be abandoned.

== Background ==
In July 2011, the Commission on the Funding of Care and Support, chaired by Sir Andrew Dilnot, published its report, Fairer Care Funding. The commission’s recommendations included a cap of £35,000 on the contribution people aged over 65 would be expected to make towards their personal care costs over their lifetime. After reaching the cap, individuals would be eligible for full state support.

== Proposal ==
In September 2021, the Conservative government announced it would provide £3.6 billion between 2022/23 and 2024/25 to reform how people pay for adult social care in England, including the introduction of an £86,000 cap on personal care costs.

The cap was legislated for in the Care Act 2014.

It was originally planned that the proposed reforms would be funded via a new Health and Social Care Levy, the revenue from which would be ringfenced for investment in health and social care. However, in September 2022, the Chancellor, Kwasi Kwarteng, announced the levy would be cancelled.

At the November 2022 Autumn Statement, Jeremy Hunt, announced they would be delayed for two years until 2024.

== Abandonment ==
On 29 July 2024, Rachel Reeves, the Chancellor of the Exchequer, announced that the reforms would be abandoned.
