= July 2015 United Kingdom budget =

2015 July United Kingdom budget
- Presented: Wednesday 8 July 2015
- Parliament: 56th
- Party: Conservative Party
- Chancellor: George Osborne
- Total revenue: £672 billion
- Total expenditures: £743 billion
- Deficit: £69 billion (3.6% of GDP)
- Website: July 2015 Budget documents

The 2015 United Kingdom summer budget was delivered by George Osborne, the Chancellor of the Exchequer, to the House of Commons on Wednesday, 8 July 2015.

This was the first fully Conservative budget since that presented by Kenneth Clarke in November 1996.

== Background ==
The background to the budget was that of significant economic growth at 3%.

The budget proposes spending of £742 billion and an income of £673 billion in 2015-16; a deficit of £69 billion (almost 10% of UK public spending).

The budget passed with a majority of 30 votes (320 votes for, 290 against with 36 abstentions).

Conservative MPs voted for the budget (with 9 abstentions). The Labour party voted against the bill with 19 MPs abstaining.

== Measures ==
- £750 million extra granted to HM Revenue and Customs to tackle tax avoidance
- Income tax personal allowance raised to £11,000
- Ordoliberal measures to introduce tax incentives for large corporations to create apprenticeships, aiming for 3 million new apprenticeships by 2020
- A national living wage of £9 an hour to be introduced by 2020 for 25+ year olds
- Inheritance tax threshold raised to £1m by 2017 for married couples
- An £800 increase in the amount of maintenance loan paid out to poorer students, paid for by replacing maintenance grants with loans
- Benefit cap reduced to £23,000 in London and £20,000 in the rest of the country
- Starting in April 2016, the Dividend Tax Credit will be removed and replaced with a tax-free Dividend Allowance of £5,000 for all taxpayers, with new rates of tax for dividend income above that amount
- Confirmation that the BBC has agreed to absorb the £650m cost of providing free television licences for over-75s
- Non-domiciled individuals
  - Non-domicile status can no longer be inherited
  - Non-domiciles who have lived in the UK for the past 15 of the last 20 years will have to pay normal taxation

=== Taxes ===
Source	2015-16 Revenues (£bn)
Income Tax	170
Value Added Tax (VAT)	133
National Insurance	115
Excise duties	47
Corporate Tax	42
Council Tax	28
Business rates	28
Other	109
Total Government revenue	672

=== Spending ===
Department	2015-16 Expenditure (£bn)
Social protection	231
Health	141
Education	99
Debt interest	36
Defence	45
Public order and safety	34
Personal social services	30
Housing and Environment	28
Transport	28
Industry, agriculture and employment	24
Other	48
Total Government spending	744
