= Purchase Tax =

Tax once levied on the wholesale value of luxury goods sold in the United Kingdom

The Purchase Tax was a tax levied between 1940 and 1973 on the wholesale value of luxury goods sold in the United Kingdom. Introduced by the Finance (No. 2) Act 1940 on 21 October 1940, with the stated aim of reducing the wastage of raw materials during World War II, it was initially set at a rate of 33.33%.

The tax was subsequently set at differing rates dependent upon individual items' degree of "luxury" as determined by the government of the day.

The 33.33% rate was increased to 66% for cars costing over £1,000 in 1947 and this rate was extended to all cars from 1951. In 1953, it was reduced to 50%.

In connection with the accession of the UK to the European Economic Community, the Purchase Tax was abolished on 2 April 1973 and replaced by the Value Added Tax (VAT), charged on most goods and services, which is currently charged at a rate of between 5 and 20%.
