= Dividend imputation =

Corporate tax system

Dividend imputation is a corporate tax system in which some or all of the tax paid by a company may be attributed, or imputed, to the shareholders by way of a tax credit to reduce the income tax payable on a distribution. In comparison to the classical system, it reduces or eliminates the tax disadvantages of distributing dividends to shareholders by only requiring them to pay the difference between the corporate rate and their marginal tax rate. The imputation system effectively taxes distributed company profit at the shareholders' average tax rates.

Australia, Malta and New Zealand have imputation systems. Canada, Korea and the United Kingdom have a partial imputation system. Germany had a dividend imputation system until 2000 and France until 2004.

The objective of the dividend imputation system is to collect tax on distributed income at the shareholder's tax rate, in order to eliminate double taxation of company profits, once at the corporate level and again on distribution as a dividend to shareholders. Other jurisdictions which do not have dividend imputation achieve a similar result by only taxing dividends at the shareholder level. For example, Chile has tax integration, and all applicable company profits are taxed only at the shareholder's tax rate, achieving a similar outcome to imputation. Others (Singapore, for example) eliminate double taxation in a different way, by not taxing dividends in the hands of the shareholder and only at the company level. Under this arrangement the shareholders obtain a tax benefit even though the company may not have paid any tax at the corporate level, and it also benefits non-resident shareholders.

== Australia ==
The Australian tax system allows companies to determine the proportion of franking credits to attach to the dividends paid. A franking credit is a nominal unit of tax paid by companies using dividend imputation. Franking credits are passed on to shareholders along with dividends.

Australian-resident shareholders include in their assessable income the grossed-up dividend amount (being the total of the dividend payable plus the associated franking credits). The income tax payable by the shareholders is calculated, and the franking credits are applied to offset the tax payable. In Australia and New Zealand the result is the elimination of double taxation of company profits.

=== History ===
Dividend imputation was introduced in 1987, one of a number of tax reforms by the Hawke–Keating Labor Government. Prior to that a company would pay company tax on its profits and if it then paid a dividend, that dividend was taxed again as income for the shareholder, i.e. a part owner of the company, a form of double taxation.

In 1997 the eligibility rules (below) were introduced by the Howard–Costello Liberal Government, with a $2,000 small shareholder exemption. In 1999 that exemption was raised to the present $5,000. In 2000, franking credits became fully refundable, not just reducing tax liability to zero. In 2002, preferential dividend streaming was banned. In 2003, New Zealand companies could elect to join the system for Australian tax they paid.

=== Operation ===
A shareholder's taxable income is grossed up to include the value of the company tax deemed to have been prepaid on the dividend. This value is also credited to the shareholder.

For example, if a company makes a profit of $100 and pays company tax of $30 (at 2006 rates) to the tax office, it records the $30 in the franking account.

The company now has $70 of retained profit to pay a dividend, either in the same year or later years. When it does so, it may attach a franking credit from its franking account, in proportion to the tax rate. If a $70 dividend is paid it could attach $30 of franking credits, and the franking account is debited by $30.

An eligible shareholder receiving a franked dividend declares as income the cash received, plus the franking credit. The franking credit is then credited against the tax payable on their income. The effect is as if the tax office reversed the company tax by giving back the $30 to the shareholder and had them treat the original $100 of profit as income, in the shareholder's hands, like the company was merely a conduit.

Thus company profits distributed to eligible shareholders are taxed in their entirety at the shareholder's rate. Profits retained by the company or distributed to ineligible shareholders remain taxed at the corporate rate.

Dividends may still be paid by a company when it has no franking credits (perhaps because it has been making tax losses), this is called an unfranked dividend. It may pay a franked portion and an unfranked portion, known as partly franked. An unfranked dividend (or the unfranked portion) is ordinary income in the hands of the shareholder.

=== Refund ===
A franking credit on dividends received after 1 July 2000 is a refundable tax credit. It is a form of tax paid, which can reduce a taxpayer's total tax liability, and any excess is refunded. For example, an individual with income below the tax-free threshold ($18,200 since 2011/12) pays no tax at all and can get the franking credits back in full, after a tax return is lodged.

Prior to 1 July 2000 such excess franking credits were lost. For example, an individual at that time paying no tax would get nothing back, they merely kept the cash part of the dividend received.

=== Investors ===
The easiest way for an investor to value a franked dividend is to think of the franking credit as part of the income they receive. The investor doesn't get it in cash, only as a kind of IOU from the tax office, but nonetheless it and the cash portion make up pre-tax income. Thus a franked dividend of $0.70 plus $0.30 credit is exactly equivalent to an unfranked dividend of $1.00, or to bank interest of $1.00, or any other ordinary income of that amount. (It's exactly equivalent because franking is fully refundable, as described above.)

Franked dividends are often described as a "tax effective" form of income. The basis for this is that the cash $0.70 looks like it's taxed at a lower rate than other income. For example, for an individual on the top rate of 48.5% (for 2006) the calculation is $0.70 plus $0.30 credit is $1.00 on which $0.485 tax is payable, but less the $0.30 credit makes $0.185 net tax, which is just 26.4% of the original $0.70. Conversely, an individual on the 20% marginal tax rate actually gets a $0.10 rebate. In this latter case, the rebate looks very much like negative tax.

There's nothing inherently wrong with the latter way of thinking about franked dividends, and it is frequently made to demonstrate how franking benefits the investor, but it can be argued a grossing-up like the former is better when comparing yields across different investment opportunities.

=== Eligibility ===
There are restrictions on who can use franking credits. Those who cannot must simply declare as income the cash dividend amount they receive. The restrictions are designed to prevent the trading of franking credits between different taxpayers. An eligible shareholder is one who either

- Owns the shares for a continuous period of 45 days or more (not counting purchase and sale days); or 90 days in the case of certain preference shares. This is the "holding period rule". Shares must be "at risk" for the necessary period, i.e. not with an offsetting derivatives position for instance.

Or who

- Has total franking credits for the tax year of less than $5000 (the "small shareholder exemption") and has not arranged to pass-on the benefits to someone else (the "related payments rule").

Thus franking credits are not available to short-term traders, only to longer term holders, but with small holders exempted provided it's for their own benefit.

The small shareholder exemption is not a "first $5000", but rather once the $5000 threshold is passed the rule is inoperative and all one's shares are under the holding period rule.

For the holding period rule, parcels of shares bought and sold at different times are reckoned on a "first in, last out" basis. Each sale is taken to be of the most recently purchased shares. This prevents a taxpayer buying just before a dividend, selling just after, and asserting it was older shares sold (to try to fulfill the holding period).

This "first in, last out" reckoning may be contrasted with capital gains tax. For capital gains the shareholder can nominate what parcel was sold from among those bought at different times.

=== Company shareholders ===
A dividend received by a company shareholder is income of the receiving company, but the dividend income is not grossed-up for the franking credit nor is the receiving company entitled to claim the franking credit as a tax credit. Instead, the franking credit is added directly to the receiving company's franking account, and can be paid out in the same way as franking credits generated by the receiving company.

This transfer of credits has made the previous "intercorporate rebates" allowances redundant. Those rebates had avoided double taxation on dividends paid from one company to another company. Those rebates were part of the original 1936 Taxation Act (section 46), meaning that the principle of eliminating double taxation has been present to some degree in Australian income tax law for a very long time.

The company tax rate has changed a few times since the introduction of dividend imputation. In each case transitional rules have been made to maintain the principle of reversing the original tax paid, even if the tax rate has changed. This has been either by separate franking accounts for separate rates (e.g. class A 39%, class B 33%), or making an adjusting recalculation of the credits (e.g. into class C 30%).

=== Trans-Tasman Imputation ===
New Zealand companies can apply to join the Australian dividend imputation system (from 2003). Doing so allows them to attach Australian franking credits to their dividends, for Australian tax they have paid. Those credits can then be used by shareholders who are Australian taxpayers, the same as dividends from an Australian company.

There are certain anti-tax-avoidance rules to prevent New Zealand companies deliberately streaming Australian franking credits towards their Australian shareholders; credits must be distributed on a pro-rata basis.

Note that it is only Australian franking credits which can be used by an Australian taxpayer. New Zealand imputation credits on dividends paid to an Australian shareholder cannot be used against that shareholder's Australian taxes.

=== Abuses of the system ===
A company is not obliged to attach franking credits to its dividends. But it costs the company nothing to do so, and the credits will benefit eligible shareholders, so it is usual to attach the maximum available. It's actually possible for a company to attach more than it has, but doing so attracts tax penalties that mean this is not worthwhile.

In the past it was permissible for corporations to direct the flow of franking credits preferentially to one type of shareholder over another so that each may benefit the most as fits their tax circumstances. For example, foreign shareholders cannot use franking credits (they can't be offset against withholding tax) but Australian shareholders can. This practice, known as dividend streaming, became illegal in 2002, whereafter all dividends within a given time frame must now be franked to a similar (but need not be identical) degree irrespective of shareholder location or which class of shares held.

=== Effective elimination of company tax and thus incentives ===
To a large extent, dividend imputation makes company tax irrelevant. This is because every dollar that a company pays in company tax can be claimed by the shareholder as franking credit, with no net revenue flowing to the government. (There are exceptions which include profits retained by the company that are never paid as dividends, and payments to international investors.)

When gross company tax is reported by Treasury, it is unclear whether the number generally includes the effect of the corresponding franking credits.

One effect is that this has reduced the effectiveness of tax incentives for corporations. If a corporation was given a tax break then its incomes thus released from taxation would not generate franking credits precisely because no tax was paid. In turn, this meant that the shareholders received fewer credits along with their dividends, meaning in turn that they had to pay more tax.

The net result is that each tax break a corporation itself got was countered by a matching increase in the tax burden of shareholders, leaving shareholders in exactly the same position had no tax break been received by the corporation. Thus, to the extent that corporate directors acted so as to increase shareholder wealth, tax incentives would not influence corporate behaviour.

== Malta ==
Malta has a dividend imputation system which is applicable to both resident and non-resident shareholders. The corporate tax rate is equivalent to the top tax bracket and the difference will be applied as a tax credit to the individual via imputation. Where the imputation credits exceed the actual tax payable on the grossed up income, the revenues office will refund the remainder.

== New Zealand ==
New Zealand introduced a dividend imputation system in 1989. It operates on similar principles to the Australian system. A shareholder receiving a dividend from a company is entitled to an "imputation credit", which represents tax paid by the company, and is used to reduce or eliminate the shareholder's income tax liability.

== United Kingdom ==
From 1973 to 1999, the UK operated an imputation system, with shareholders able to claim a tax credit reflecting advance corporation tax (ACT) paid by a company when a distribution was made. A company could set off ACT against the company's annual corporation tax liability, subject to limitations.

In 1999 ACT was abolished. Shareholders receiving a dividend were still entitled to a tax credit to offset their tax liability, but the tax credit no longer necessarily represented tax paid by the company, and could not be refunded to the shareholder. The tax credit was abolished as of 6 April 2016 and replaced with a tax-free dividend allowance of £5,000 (2017/2018). The dividend allowance was reduced to £2,000 from 6 April 2018, and then to £1,000 for the April 2023 to April 2024 tax year. A further reduction down to £500 was announced in the Budget Statement in November 2022. Taxation legislation refers to the dividend allowance as "the dividend nil rate".

== See also ==
- Corporate tax
- Dividend stripping, on buying shares to access dividends
- Dividend tax
- fr:Avoir fiscal (in French)
