= United Kingdom corporation tax =

UK tax on UK-resident companies and companies with permanent establishments in the UK

Throughout this article, the term "pound" and the £ symbol refer to the Pound sterling.

Corporation tax in the United Kingdom is a corporate tax levied in on the profits made by UK-resident companies and on the profits of entities registered overseas with either permanent establishments or property businesses in the UK. Companies are resident in the UK if they are either incorporated or centrally managed and controlled in the UK.

Until 1 April 1965, companies were taxed at the same income tax rates as individual taxpayers, with an additional profits tax levied on companies. Finance Act 1965 replaced this structure for companies and associations with a single corporate tax, which took its basic structure and rules from the income tax system.

Originally introduced as a classical tax system, in which companies were subject to tax on their profits and companies' shareholders were also liable to income tax on the dividends that they received, the first major amendment to corporation tax saw it move to a dividend imputation system in 1973, under which an individual receiving a dividend became entitled to an income tax credit representing the corporation tax already paid by the company paying the dividend. The classical system was reintroduced in 1999, with the abolition of advance corporation tax and of repayable dividend tax credits. Another change saw the single main rate of tax split into three. Tax competition between jurisdictions reduced the main corporate tax rate from 28% in 2008–2010 to a flat rate of 19% as of April 2017. It then reversed back again in April 2023, increasing to 25% for companies with profits in excess of £250,000.

The UK government faced problems with its corporate tax structure, including European Court of Justice judgements that aspects of it are incompatible with EU treaties. Tax avoidance schemes marketed by the financial sector have also proven an irritant, and been countered by complicated anti-avoidance legislation.

The complexity of the corporation tax system is a recognised issue. The New Labour government (1997–2010), supported by the opposition parties, carried through wide-scale reform from the Tax Law Rewrite Project, resulting in the Corporation Tax Act 2009 and Corporation Tax Act 2010. Before these statutes, corporation tax was largely governed by the Income and Corporation Taxes Act 1988. Corporation tax has slowly been integrating generally accepted accounting practice, with the corporation tax system in various specific areas based directly on the accounting treatment.

UK corporation tax receipts have risen markedly over the last decade. From £37.4bn in 2013-14 to £92.2bn in 2023-24, and are forecast to rise to £112.6bn in 2028-29. Note: these figures exclude offshore oil and gas corporate income tax.

== History ==
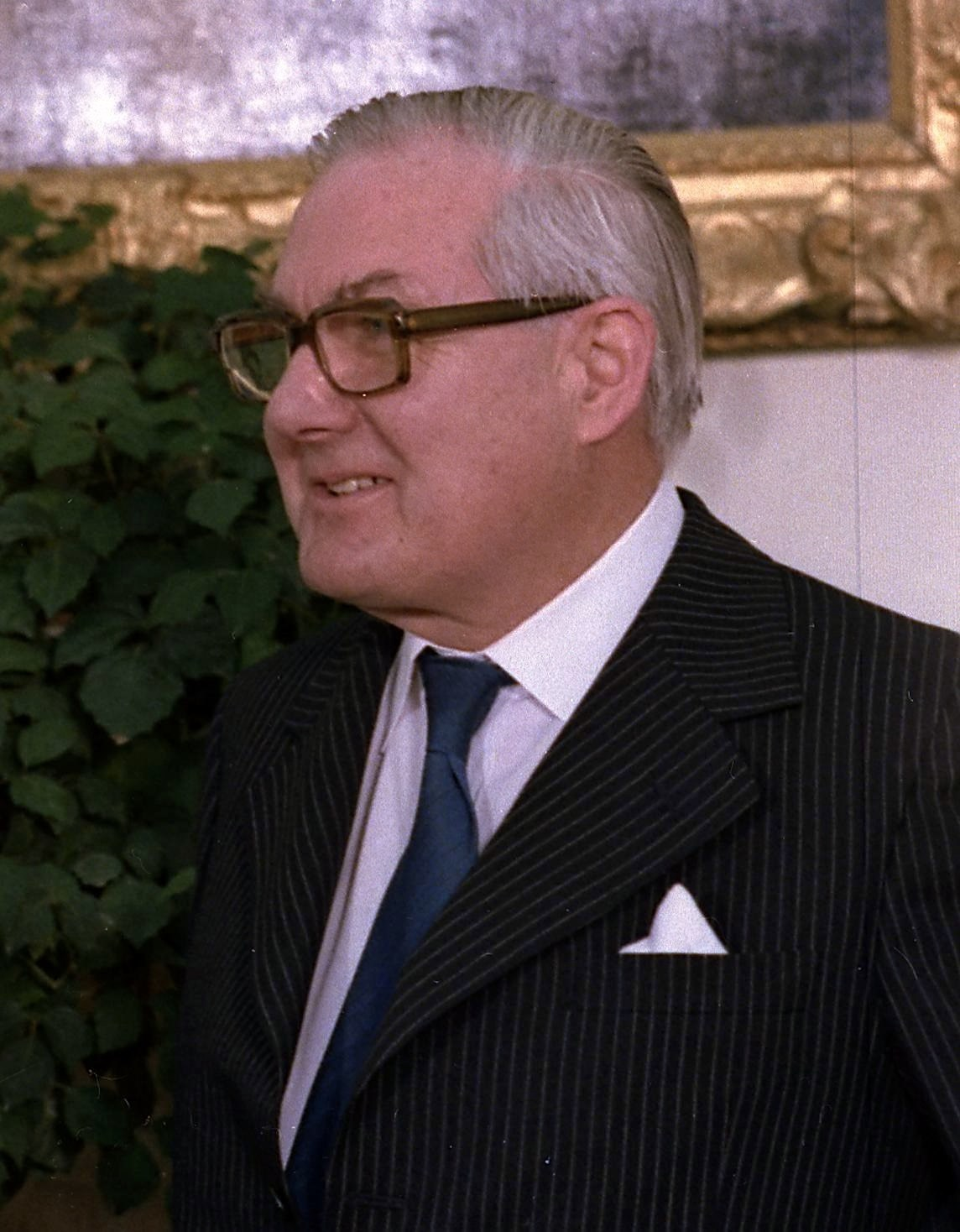
Jim Callaghan, the Chancellor of the Exchequer who introduced corporation tax in 1965.

Until 1965, companies were subject to income tax on their profits at the same rates as was levied on individual taxpayers. A dividend imputation system existed, whereby the income tax paid by a company was offset against the income tax liability of a shareholder who received dividends from the company. The standard rate of income tax in 1949 was 50%. If the company paid a £100 dividend, the recipient would be treated as if he had earned £200 and had paid £100 in income tax on it – the tax paid by the company fully covered the tax due from the individual on the dividend paid. If, however, the individual was subject to tax at a higher rate (known as "surtax"), he (not the company) would be liable to pay the additional tax.

In addition to income tax, companies were also subject to a profits tax, which was deducted from company profits when determining the income tax liability. It was a differential tax, with a higher tax rate on dividends (profits distributed to shareholders) than on profits retained within the company. By penalising the distribution of profits, it was hoped companies would retain profits for investment, which was considered a priority after the Second World War. The tax did not have the desired effect, so the distributed profits tax was increased by 20% by the post-war Labour government to encourage companies to retain more of their profits. At the time of Hugh Gaitskell's 1951 budget, the profits tax was 50% for distributed profits and 10% for undistributed profits.

A series of reductions in the profits tax were brought in from 1951 onwards by the new Conservative government. The tax rates fell to 22.5% on distributed profits and 2.5% on undistributed profits by 1957, but the profits tax was no longer income tax-deductible. Derick Heathcoat-Amory's Budget of March 1958 replaced the differential profits tax with a single profits tax measure, applicable to both retained and distributed profits. This gradual decrease, and final abolition, of taxes on capital distributions reflected ideological differences between the Conservative and Labour parties: the Conservative approach was to distribute profits to capital holders for investment elsewhere, while Labour sought to force companies to retain profits for reinvestment in the company in the hope this would benefit the company's workforce.

=== Finance Act 1965 ===
Finance Act 1965 replaced the system of income tax and profits tax from 1 April 1965 with the Corporation Tax, which re-introduced aspects of the old system. Corporation Tax was charged at a uniform rate on all profits, but additional tax was then payable if profits were distributed as a dividend to shareholders. In effect, dividends suffered double taxation. This method of corporation tax is known as the classical system and is similar to that used in the United States. The effect of the tax was to revert to the distribution tax in operation from 1949 to 1959: dividend payments were subject to higher tax than profits retained within the company. Finance Act 1965 also introduced a capital gains tax, at a rate of 30%, charged on the gains arising on the disposal of capital assets by individuals. While companies were exempted from capital gains tax, they were liable to corporation tax on their "chargeable gains", which were calculated in substantially the same way as capital gains for individuals. The tax applied to company shares as well as other assets. Before 1965, capital gains were not taxed, and it was advantageous for taxpayers to argue that a receipt was non-taxable "capital" rather than taxable "revenue".

=== Advance corporation tax ===
The basic structure of the tax, where company profits were taxed as profits, and dividend payments were then taxed as income, remained unchanged until 1973, when a partial imputation system was introduced for dividend payments. Unlike the previous imputation system, the tax credit to the shareholder was less than the corporation tax paid (corporation tax was higher than the standard rate of income tax, but the imputation, or set-off, was only of standard rate tax). When companies made distributions, they also paid the advance corporation tax (known as ACT), which could be set off against the main corporation tax charge, subject to certain limits (the full amount of ACT paid could not be recovered if significantly large amounts of profits were distributed). Individuals and companies who received a dividend from a UK company received a tax credit representing the ACT paid. Individuals could set off the tax credit against their income tax liability.

On introduction, ACT was set at 30% of the gross dividend (the actual amount paid plus the tax credit). If a company made a £70 dividend payment to an individual, the company would pay £30 of advance corporation tax. The shareholder would receive the £70 cash payment, plus a tax credit of £30; thus, the individual would be deemed to have earned £100, and to have already paid tax of £30 on it. The ACT paid by the company would be deductible against its final "mainstream" corporation tax bill. To the extent that the individual's tax on the dividend was less than the tax credit – for example, if his income was too low to pay tax (below £595 in 1973–1974) – he would be able to reclaim some or all of the £30 tax paid by the company. The set-off was only partial, since the company would pay 52% tax (small companies had lower rates, but still higher than the ACT rate), and thus the £70 received by the individual actually represented pre-tax profits of £145.83. Accordingly, only part of the double taxation was relieved.

ACT was not payable on dividends from one UK company to another (unless the payor company elected to pay it). Also, the recipient company was not taxed on that dividend receipt, except for dealers in shares and life assurance companies in respect of some of their profits. As the payor company would have suffered tax on the payments it made, the company that received the dividend also received a credit that it could use to reduce the amount of ACT it itself paid, or, in certain cases, apply to have the tax credit repaid to them.

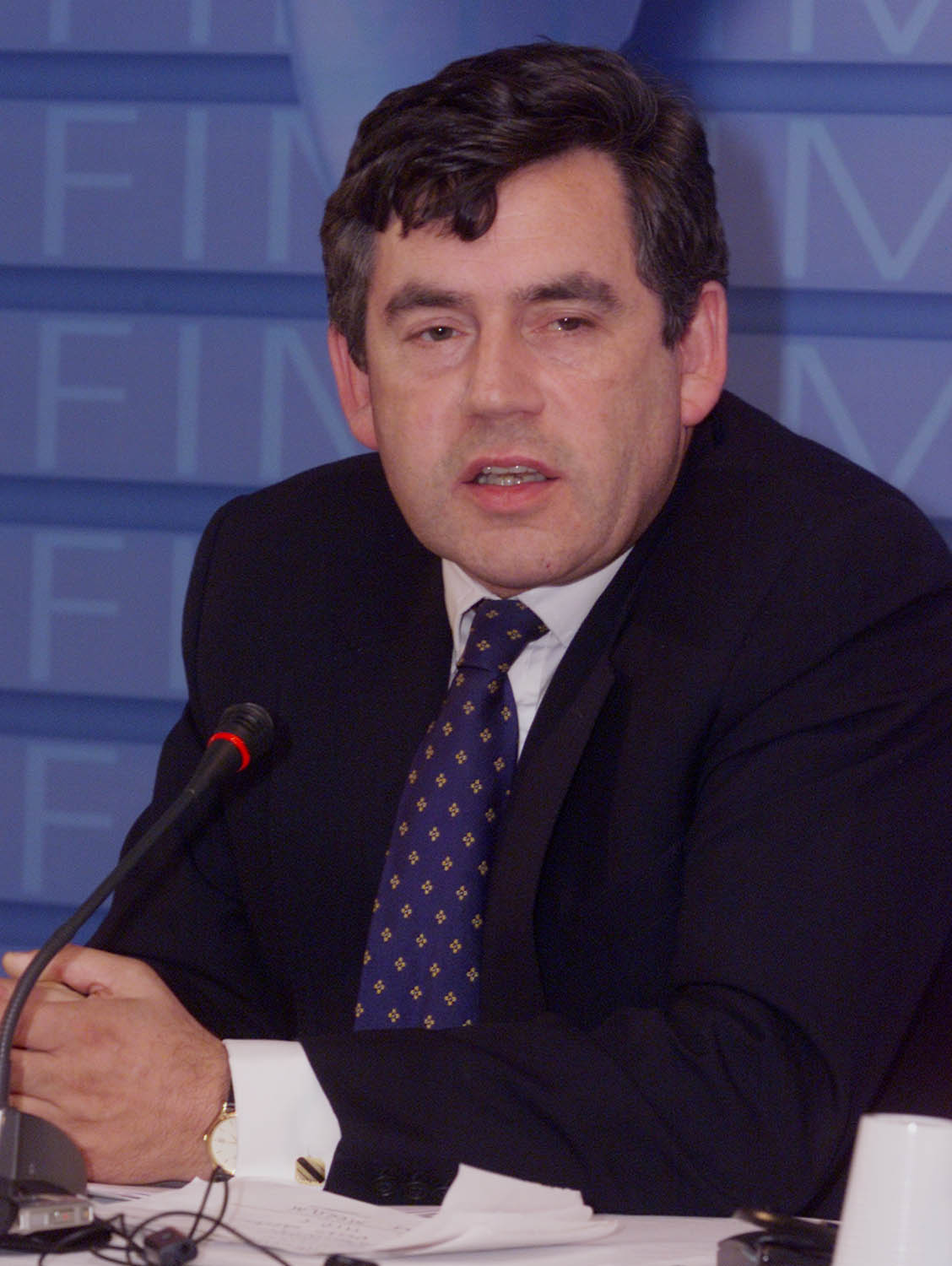
Gordon Brown, the Chancellor of the Exchequer who abolished ACT and introduced the quarterly instalment regime in 1999.

The level of ACT was linked to the basic rate of income tax between 1973 and 1993. The March 1993 Budget of Norman Lamont cut the ACT rate and tax credit to 22.5% from April 1993, and 20% from April 1994. These changes were accompanied with a cut of income tax on dividends to 20%, while the basic rate of income tax remained at 25%. Persons liable for tax were lightly affected by the change, because income tax liability was still balanced by the tax credit received, although higher rate tax payers paid an additional 25% tax on the amount of the dividend actually received (net), as against 20% before the change. The change had bigger effects on pensions and non-taxpayers. A pension fund receiving a £1.2 m dividend income prior to the change would have been able to reclaim £400,000 in tax, giving a total income of £1.6 m. After the change, only £300,000 was reclaimable, reducing income to £1.5 m, a fall of 6.25%.

Gordon Brown's summer Budget of 1997 ended the ability of pension funds and other tax-exempt companies to reclaim tax credits with immediate effect, and for individuals from April 1999. This tax change has been blamed for the poor state of British pension provision, while usually ignoring the more significant effect of the dot-com crash of 2000 onwards when the FTSE-100 lost half its value to fall from 6930 at the beginning of 2000 to just 3490 by March 2003. Despite this, critics such as Member of Parliament Frank Field described it as a "hammer blow" and the Sunday Times described it as a swindle, with the hypothetical £1.5 m income described above falling to £1.2 m, a fall in income of 20%, because no tax would be reclaimable.

==== Abolition of advance corporation tax ====
From 6 April 1999 ACT was abolished, and the tax credit on dividends was reduced to 10%. There was a matching reduction in the basic income tax rate on dividends to 10%, while a new higher-rate of 32.5% was introduced which led to an overall effective 25% tax rate for higher rate taxpayers on dividends (after setting this "notional" tax credit against the tax liability).While non-taxpayers were no longer able to claim this amount from the treasury (as opposed to taxpayers who could deduct it from their tax bill), the 20% ACT (which would have previously been deducted from the dividend before payment) was no longer levied.

ACT that had been incurred prior to 1999 could still be set off against a company's tax liability, provided it would have been able to set it off under the old imputation system. In order to keep the stream of payments associated with advance corporation tax payment, 'large' companies (comprising the majority of corporation tax receipts) were subjected to a quarterly instalments scheme for tax payment.

=== Rates ===
==== Main and small companies' rates ====
On its introduction in 1965, corporation tax was charged at 40%, rising to 45% in the 1969 Budget. The rate then fell to 42.5% in the second Budget of 1970 and 40% in 1971. In 1973, alongside the introduction of advance corporation tax (ACT), Conservative chancellor Anthony Barber created a main rate of 52%, together with a smaller companies' rate of 42%. This apparent increase was negated by the fact that under the ACT scheme, dividends were no longer subject to income tax.

The 1979 Conservative Budget of Geoffrey Howe cut the small companies' rate to 40%, followed by a further cut in the 1982 Budget to 38%. The Budgets of 1983–1988 saw sharp cuts in both main and small companies' rates, falling to 35% and 25% respectively. Budgets between 1988 and 2001 brought further falls to a 30% main rate and 19% small companies' rates. From April 1983 to March 1997 the small companies' rate was pegged to the basic rate of income tax. During the 1980s there was briefly a higher rate of tax imposed for capital profits.

Table of corporation tax rates over time
Year (from 1 April)	Lower limit (small rate profit threshold)	Small companies' rate	Upper limit (standard rate threshold)	Main rate	Standard marginal relief fraction
2026	£50,000	19%	£250,000	25%	3/200
2025	£50,000	19%	£250,000	25%	3/200
2024	£50,000	19%	£250,000	25%	3/200
2023	£50,000	19%	£250,000	25%	3/200
2022	N/A	N/A	£nil	19%	N/A
2021	N/A	N/A	£nil	19%	N/A
2020	N/A	N/A	£nil	19% (Note: The main rate for 2020 was originally set to be 18%, this was subsequently set to be reduced to 17%, but ultimately was set at 19%.)	N/A
2019	N/A	N/A	£nil	19%	N/A
2018	N/A	N/A	£nil	19%	N/A
2017	N/A	N/A	£nil	19%	N/A
2016	N/A	N/A	£nil	20%	N/A
2015	N/A	N/A	£nil	20%	N/A
2014	£300,000	20%	£1,500,000	21%	1/400
2013	£300,000	20%	£1,500,000	23%	3/400
2012	£300,000	20%	£1,500,000	24% (Note: The main rate for 2012 was originally set to be 25% but was subsequently reduced to 24%.)	1/100
2011	£300,000	20%	£1,500,000	26% (Note: The main rate for 2011 was originally set to be 28% but was subsequently reduced to 27% and ultimately reduced to 26%.)	3/200
2010	£300,000	21%	£1,500,000	28%	7/400
2009	£300,000 (Note: Limits for marginal relief set from 1994 to 2009 (inclusive) by changes made to the Income and Corporation Taxes Act 1988 enacted by Finance Act 1994)	21%	£1,500,000	28%	7/400
2008	£300,000	21%	£1,500,000	28%	7/400
2007	£300,000	20%	£1,500,000	30%	1/40
2006	£300,000	19%	£1,500,000	30%	11/400
2005	£300,000	19%	£1,500,000	30%	11/400
2004	£300,000	19%	£1,500,000	30%	11/400
2003	£300,000	19%	£1,500,000	30%	11/400
2002	£300,000	19%	£1,500,000	30%	11/400
2001	£300,000	20%	£1,500,000	30%	1/40
2000	£300,000	20%	£1,500,000	30%	1/40
1999	£300,000	20%	£1,500,000	30%	1/40
1998	£300,000	21%	£1,500,000	31%	1/40
1997	£300,000	23%	£1,500,000	33%	1/40
1996	£300,000	24%	£1,500,000	33%	9/400
1995	£300,000	25%	£1,500,000	33%	1/50
1994	£300,000	25%	£1,500,000	33%	1/50
1993	£250,000 (Note: Limits for marginal relief set from 1991 to 1993 (inclusive) by changes made to the Income and Corporation Taxes Act 1988 enacted by Finance Act 1991)	25%	£1,250,000	33%	1/50
1992	£250,000	25%	£1,250,000	33%	1/50
1991	£250,000	25%	£1,250,000	33%	1/50
1990	£200,000 (Note: Limit for marginal relief for 1990 set by changes made to the Income and Corporation Taxes Act 1988 enacted by Finance Act 1990)	25%	£1,000,000	35%	1/40
1989	£150,000 (Note: Limit for marginal relief for 1989 set by changes made to the Income and Corporation Taxes Act 1988 enacted by Finance Act 1989)	25%	£750,000	35%	1/40
1988	£100,000	25%	£500,000	35%	1/40
1987	£100,000 (Note: Limits for marginal relief set from 1982 to 1987 (inclusive) by changes made to the Finance Act 1972 enacted by Finance (No. 2) Act 1983)	27%	£500,000	35%	1/50
1986	£100,000	29% (Note: The small companies rate for 1986 was originally set to be 30% and marginal relief fraction at 1/80 but was subsequently reduced to 29% with the fraction changing to 3/200.)	£500,000	35%	3/200
1985	£100,000	30%	£500,000	40%	1/40
1984	£100,000	30%	£500,000	45%	3/80
1983	£100,000	30%	£500,000	50%	1/20
1982	£100,000	38%	£500,000	52%	7/200
1981	£90,000 (Note: Limits for marginal relief set for 1981 set by changes made to the Finance Act 1972 enacted by Finance Act 1982)	40%	£225,000	52%	2/25
1980	£80,000 (Note: Limits for marginal relief set for 1980 set by changes made to the Finance Act 1972 enacted by Finance Act 1981)	40%	£200,000	52%	2/25
1979	£70,000 (Note: Limits for marginal relief set for 1979 set by changes made to the Finance Act 1972 enacted by Finance Act 1980)	40%	£130,000	52%	7/50
1978	£60,000 (Note: Limits for marginal relief set for 1978 set by changes made to the Finance Act 1972 enacted by Finance (No. 2) Act 1979)	40%	£100,000	52%	3/20
1977	£50,000 (Note: Limits for marginal relief set for 1977 set by changes made to the Finance Act 1972 enacted by Finance Act 1978)	42%	£85,000	52%	1/7
1976	£40,000 (Note: Limits for marginal relief set for 1976 set by changes made to the Finance Act 1972 enacted by Finance Act 1977)	42%	£65,000	52%	4/25
1975	£30,000 (Note: Limits for marginal relief set for 1975 set by changes made to the Finance Act 1972 enacted by Finance Act 1976)	42%	£50,000	52%	3/20
1974	£25,000 (Note: Limits for marginal relief set for 1973 & 1974 set by changes made to the Finance Act 1972 enacted by Finance Act 1974)	42%	£40,000	52%	1/6
1973	£25,000	42%	£40,000	52%	1/6
1972	N/A	N/A	N/A	40%	N/A
1971	N/A	N/A	N/A	40%	N/A
1970	N/A	N/A	N/A	40%	N/A
1969	N/A	N/A	N/A	45%	N/A
1968	N/A	N/A	N/A	45%	N/A
1967	N/A	N/A	N/A	42%	N/A
1966	N/A	N/A	N/A	40%	N/A
1965	N/A	N/A	N/A	40%	N/A
1964	N/A	N/A	N/A	40%	N/A

==== Starting rate and non-corporate distribution rate ====
Chancellor Gordon Brown's 1999 Budget introduced a 10% starting rate for profits from £0 to £10,000, effective from April 2000. Marginal relief applied meaning companies with profits of between £10,000 and £50,000 paid a rate between the starting rate and the small companies' rate (19% in 2000).

The 2002 Budget cut the starting rate to zero, with marginal relief applying in the same way. This caused a significant increase in the number of companies being incorporated, as businesses that had operated as self-employed, paying income tax on profits from just over £5,000, were attracted to the corporation tax rate of 0% on income up to £10,000. Previously self-employed individuals could now distribute profits as dividend payments rather than salaries. For companies with profits under £50,000 the corporation tax rate varied between 0% and 19%. Because dividend payments come with a basic rate tax credit, provided the recipient did not earn more than the basic rate allowance, no further tax would be paid. The number of new companies being formed in 2002–2003 reached 325,900, an increase of 45% on 2001–2002.

The fact that individuals operating in this manner could potentially pay no tax at all was felt by the government to be unfair tax avoidance, and the 2004 Budget introduced a Non-Corporate Distribution Rate. This ensured that where a company paid below the small companies' rate (19% in 2004), dividend payments made to non-corporates (for example, individuals, trusts and personal representatives of deceased persons) would be subject to additional corporation tax, bringing the corporation tax paid up to 19%. For example, a company making £10,000 profit, and making a £6,000 dividend distribution to an individual and £4,000 to another company would pay 19% corporation tax on the £6,000. Although this measure substantially reduced the number of small businesses incorporating, the Chancellor in the 2006 Budget said tax avoidance by small businesses through incorporation was still a major issue, and scrapped the starting rate entirely.

=== Historic tax revenues ===
The following graph shows UK corporation tax revenue from 1999 to 2017:

View source data.

=== Taxable profits and accounting profits ===
The starting point for computing taxable profits is profits before tax (except for a life assurance company). The rules for calculating corporation tax generally ran in parallel with income tax until 1993, when the first statutory rule to move profit reporting into line with generally accepted accounting practice was introduced, although the courts were already moving towards requiring trading profits to be computed using general accountancy rules.

The Finance Act 1993 introduced rules to make tax on exchange gains and losses mimic their treatment in a company's financial statements in most instances. The Finance Act 1994 saw similar rules for financial instruments, and in the Finance Act 1996 the treatment of most loan relationships was also brought into line with the accounting treatment. The Finance Act 1997 saw something similar with rental premiums. A year later, the Finance Act 1998 went even further, making it clear that taxable trading profits (apart from those accruing to a Lloyd's corporate name or to a life assurance company) and profits from a rental business are equal to profits calculated under generally accepted accounting practice ("GAAP") unless there is a specific statutory or case law rule to the contrary. This was followed up by the Finance Act 2004, which provided that where a company with investment business could make deductions for management expenses, they were calculated by reference to figures in the financial statements.

==== International Financial Reporting Standards ====
From 2005, all European Union listed companies have to prepare their financial statements using the "International Financial Reporting Standards" ("IFRS"), as modified by the EU. Other UK companies may choose to adopt IFRS. Corporation tax law is changing so that, in the future, IFRS accounting profits are largely respected. The exception is for certain financial instruments and certain other measures to prevent tax arbitrage between companies applying IFRS and companies applying UK GAAP.

=== Avoidance ===
Tax avoidance is defined by the UK government as "bending the rules of the tax system to gain a tax advantage that Parliament never intended". Unlike most other countries, most UK tax professionals are accountants rather than lawyers by training.

Until 2013, the UK had no general anti-avoidance rule ("GAAR") for corporation tax. However, it inherited an anti-avoidance rule from income tax relating to transactions in securities, and since then has had various "mini-GAARs" added to it. The best known "mini-GAAR" prevents a deduction for interest paid when the loan to which it relates is made for an "unallowable purpose". In 2013, the government introduced a General Anti-Avoidance Rule to manage the risk of tax avoidance.

Finance Act 2004 introduced disclosure rules requiring promoters of certain tax avoidance schemes that are financing- or employment-related to disclose the scheme. Taxpayers who use these schemes must also disclose their use when they submit their tax returns. This is the first provision of its kind in the UK, and Finance Act 2005 has shown a number of tax avoidance schemes being blocked earlier than would have been expected prior to the disclosure rules.

=== Need for greater revenues ===
In the early twenty-first century the government sought to raise more revenues from corporation tax. In 2002 it introduced a separate 10% supplementary charge on profits from oil and gas extraction businesses, and Finance Act 2005 contained measures to accelerate when oil and gas extraction business have to pay tax. Instead of paying their tax in four equal instalments in the seventh, tenth, thirteenth and sixteenth month after the accounting period starts, they will be required to consolidate their third and fourth payments and pay them in the thirteenth month, creating a cash flow advantage for the government. Finance (No. 2) Act 2005 continued measures specifically relating to life assurance companies. When originally announced (as Finance (No.3) Bill 2005) Legal & General told the Stock Exchange that £300 m had been wiped off its value, and Aviva (Norwich Union) announced that the tax changes would cost its policy holders £150 m.

== Method of charge ==
Powers to collect corporation tax must be passed annually by parliament, otherwise there is no authority to collect it. The charge for the financial year (beginning 1 April each year) is imposed by successive finance acts. The tax is charged in respect of the company's accounting period, which is normally the 12-month period for which the company prepares its accounts. Corporation tax is administered by HM Revenue & Customs (HMRC).

=== Assessment ===
Corporation tax is levied on the net profits of a company. Except for certain life assurance companies, it is borne by the company as a direct tax.

Up until 1999 no corporation tax was due unless HMRC raised an assessment on a company. Companies were, however, obliged to report certain details to HMRC so that the right amount could be assessed. This changed for accounting periods ending on or after 1 July 1999, when self-assessment was introduced. Self-assessment means that companies are required to assess themselves and take full responsibility for that assessment. If the self-assessment is wrong through negligence or recklessness, the company can be liable to penalties. The self-assessment tax return needs to be delivered to HMRC 12 months after the end of the period of account in which the accounting period falls (although the tax must be paid before this date). If a company fails to submit a return by then, it is liable to penalties. HMRC may then issue a determination of the tax payable, which cannot be appealed – however, in practice they wait until a further six months have elapsed. Also, the most common claims and elections that may be made by a company have to be part of its tax return, with a time limit of two years after the end of the accounting period. This means that a company submitting its return more than one year late suffers not only from the late filing penalties, but also from the inability to make these claims and elections.

From 2004 there has been a requirement for new companies to notify HM Revenue & Customs of their formation, although HMRC receives notifications of new company registrations from Companies House. Companies will then receive an annual notice CT603, approximately 1–2 months after the end of the company's financial period, notifying it to complete an annual return. This must also include the company's annual accounts, and possibly other documents, such as auditors' reports, that are required for certain companies.

=== Schedular system ===
In the United Kingdom the source rule applies. This means that something is taxed only if there is a specific provision bringing it within the charge to tax. Accordingly, profits are only charged to corporation tax if they fall within one of the following, and are not otherwise exempted by an explicit provision of the Taxes Acts:

	Scope
Schedule A	Income from UK land
Schedule D	Taxable income not falling within another Schedule
Schedule F	Income from UK dividends
Chargeable gains	Gains as defined by legislation that are not taxed as income
CFC charge	Profits made by controlled foreign companies where no exemption applies

Notes:

1. In practice companies do not get taxed under Schedule F. Most companies are exempted from Schedule F and there is a provision for those companies which are taxed on UK dividends (i.e. dealers in shares (stock)) that removes the charge from Schedule F to Schedule D.
2. A Controlled Foreign Company ("CFC") is a company controlled by a UK resident that is not itself UK resident and is subject to a lower rate of tax in the territory in which it is resident. Under certain circumstances, UK resident companies that control a CFC pay corporation tax on what the UK tax profits of that CFC would have been. However, because of a wide range of exemptions, very few companies suffer a CFC charge.
3. Schedules B, C and E used to, but no longer, exist.
4. Authorised unit trusts and OEICs are not liable to tax on their chargeable gains.

Schedule D is itself divided into a number of cases:

	Scope
Case I	Profits from a UK trade
Case III	Interest-type income and gains/losses on loans, derivatives, financial instruments and intangibles
Case V	Overseas income
Case VI	Annual income not falling within Cases I, III and V, and other income/gains specifically taxed under Case VI

Notes:

1. Cases II and IV only apply to income tax and not corporation tax.

Strictly speaking, Corporation Tax Act 2010 replaces the historic terminology "Schedule A", "Schedule D Case I" etc. with more descriptive terms but this does not affect the substantive application of the schedular system so that, for example, different rules apply for utilising tax losses depending upon the nature of the income under which the losses arises.

==== Relief for expenses ====
Most direct expenses are deductible when calculating taxable income and chargeable gains. Notable exceptions include any costs of entertaining clients. Companies with investment business may deduct certain indirect expenses known as "expenses of management" when calculating their taxable profits. A similar relief is available for expenses of a life assurance company taxed on the I minus E basis which relate to the company's basic life assurance and general annuity business. Donations made to charities are also normally deducted in calculating taxable income if made under Gift Aid.

=== Rates and payment ===
The 2007 Budget announced a main rate cut from 30% to 28%, effective from April 2008. At the same time, the small companies' rate was increased from 19% to 20% from April 2007, 21% in April 2008, to stop "individuals artificially incorporating as small companies to avoid paying their due share of tax, a practice if left unaddressed would cost the rest of the taxpaying population billions of pounds".

The rate of corporation tax is determined by the financial year, which runs from 1 April to the following 31 March. Financial year FY17 started on 1 April 2017 and ends on 31 March 2018. Where a company's accounting period straddles a financial year in which the corporation tax rate has changed, the company's profits for that period are split. For example, a company paying small companies' rate with its accounting period running from 1 January to 31 December, and making £100,000 of profit in 2007, would be deemed to have made 90/365*£100,000 = £24,657.53 in FY06 (there are 90 days between 1 January and 31 March), and 275/365*£100,000=£75,34.47 in FY07, and would pay 19% on the FY06 portion, and 20% on the FY07 portion.

From 1 April 2010 HM Revenue & Customs updated their terminology and the former Small Companies' Rate is now called Small Profits Rate.

Corporate tax rates for financial years 2008–2014
	2008–2010	2011	2012	2013	2014
Small profits rate	21%	20%	20%	20%	20%
Small profits upper limit	£300,000	£300,000	£300,000	£300,000	£300,000
Marginal relief limits	£300,001 – £1,500,000	£300,001 – £1,500,000	£300,001 – £1,500,000	£300,001 – £1,500,000	£300,001 – £1,500,000
Main rate	28%	26%	24%	23%	21%

Notes:

1. The bands shown on the right hand side are divided by one plus the number of associates (usually the only associates a company has are fellow group companies, but the term is more widely defined)
2. The reduced rates do not apply to close investment holding companies (companies controlled by fewer than 5 people (plus associates) or by their directors/managers, whose main activity is the holding of investments). Nor do they apply to companies in liquidation after the first 12 months.
3. Authorised unit trusts and open-ended investment companies are taxed at the basic rate of income tax which is 20% as of 2010
4. Life assurance companies are taxed using the above rates on shareholder profits and 20% on policy holder profits
5. Companies active in the oil and gas extraction industry in the UK or on the UK Continental Shelf are subject to an additional 10% charge on their profits from those activities

Most companies are required to pay tax nine months and a day after the end of an accounting period. Larger companies are required to pay quarterly instalments, in the seventh, tenth, thirteenth and sixteenth months after a full accounting period starts. These times are modified where an accounting period lasts for less than twelve months. From 2005 onwards, for tax payable on oil and gas extraction profits, the third and fourth quarterly instalments are merged, including the supplementary 10% charge.

In the financial year 2004–2005, approximately 39,000 companies paid corporation tax at the main rate. These 4.7% of active companies are responsible for 75% of all corporation tax receipts. Around 224,000 companies paid the small companies rate, with 34,000 benefiting from marginal relief. 264,000 were in the starting rate, with 269,000 benefiting from the lower band of marginal relief. The total revenue was £41.9bn from 831,885 companies. Only 23480 companies had a liability in excess of £100,000.

=== HM Revenue and Customs powers of enquiry ===
HMRC has one year from either the date the return is filed or the normal filing date, which is itself one year after the end of the period of account, to open an enquiry into the return. This period is extended if the return is filed late. The enquiry continues until all issues that HMRC wish to enquire about a return are dealt with. However, a company can appeal to the tribunal to close an enquiry if they feel there is undue delay. During or on the conclusion of the enquiry, HMRC can amend the company's tax return where they believe it is inaccurate.

Once an enquiry is closed, or the time for opening an enquiry has passed, HMRC can only re-open a tax return if they become aware of an issue which they could not reasonably have known about at the time, or in instances of fraud or negligence. In fraud or negligence cases, they can re-open cases from up to 20 years ago. After an HMRC enquiry closes, or after final determination of an issue by the courts, the taxpayer has 30 days to amend their return, and make additional claims and elections, if appropriate, before the assessment becomes final and conclusive. If there is no enquiry, the assessment becomes final and conclusive once the period in which the Revenue may open an enquiry passes.

If a company disputes an amendment of their tax return or an assessment from HMRC, they may appeal to the tribunal. Either side can then make appeals on points of law to the High Court (Court of Session in Scotland), then the Court of Appeal, and finally to the Supreme Court. However, decisions of fact are binding.

== Relief from double taxation ==
There is a risk of double taxation whenever a company receives income that has already been taxed. This could be dividend income, which will have been paid out of the post-tax profits of another company and which may have suffered withholding tax. Or it could be because the company itself has suffered foreign tax, perhaps because it conducts part of its trade through an overseas permanent establishment, or because it receives other types of foreign income.

Double taxation is avoided for UK dividends by exempting them from tax for most companies: only dealers in shares suffer tax on them. Where double taxation arises because of overseas tax suffered, relief is available either in the form of expense or credit relief. Expense relief allows the overseas tax to be treated as a deductible expense in the tax computation. Credit relief is given as a deduction from the UK tax liability, but is restricted to the amount of UK tax suffered on the foreign income. There is a system of onshore pooling, so that overseas tax suffered in high tax territories may be set off against taxable income arising from low tax territories. From 1 July 2009, new rules were introduced to exempt most non-UK dividends from corporation tax so these double taxation rules in respect of non-UK dividends will be of less common application in practice after that date.

== Loss relief ==
Detailed and separate rules apply to how all the different types of losses may be set off within the computations of a company. A detailed explanation of these can be found in: United Kingdom corporation tax loss relief.

=== Group relief ===
The UK does not permit tax consolidation, where companies in a group are treated as though they are a single entity for tax purposes. One of the main benefits of tax consolidation is that tax losses in one entity in a group are automatically relievable against the tax profits of another. Instead, the UK permits a form of loss relief called "group relief".

Where a company has losses arising in an accounting period (other than capital losses, or losses arising under Case V or VI of Schedule D) in excess of its other taxable profits for the period, it may surrender these losses to a group member with sufficient taxable profits in the same accounting period. The company receiving the losses may offset them against their own taxable profits. Exceptions include that a company in the oil and gas extraction industry may not accept group relief against the profits arising on its oil and gas extraction business, and a life assurance company may only accept group relief against its profits chargeable to tax at the standard shareholder rate applicable to that company. Separate rules apply for dual resident companies.

Full group relief is permitted between companies subject to UK corporation tax that are in the same 75% group, where companies have a common ultimate parent, and at least 75% of the shares in each company (other than the ultimate parent) are owned by other companies in the group. The companies making up a 75% group do not all need to be UK-resident or subject to UK corporation tax relief. An open-ended investment company cannot form part of a group.

Consortium relief is permitted where a company subject to UK corporation tax is owned by a consortium of companies that each own at least 5% of the shares and together own at least 75% of the shares. A consortium company can only surrender or accept losses in proportion to how much of that company is owned by each consortium group.

== Interaction with European law ==
Although there are no European Union directives dealing with direct taxes, UK laws must comply with European legislation. In particular, legislation should not be discriminatory under the EC treaty. A number of cases where UK tax laws are believed to be discriminatory have been brought to the European Court of Justice, usually with respect to freedom of establishment and freedom of movement of capital. Key cases which have been decided include:

- Hoechst – where the Court found that the way the partial imputation system operated prior to its abolition in 1999 was discriminatory;
- Lankhorst-Hohorst – a German case which implied that the UK's transfer pricing and thin capitalisation legislation may have been contrary to EU legislation (the 2004 Finance Act made changes to counter this threat);
- Marks and Spencer – where it was claimed that UK parents should be able to relieve the losses of overseas subsidiaries against the tax profits of their UK subgroup (On 7 April 2005, the Advocate-General gave an opinion supporting the claim of a UK parent to offset losses of its EU subsidiaries, where no effective loss relief was available in the EU Member States the subsidiaries were resident in). However, in the final judgment, a compromise agreement was reached in which the national interest to prevent excessive loss of tax was held to outweigh in most circumstances the restriction on the freedom of movement of capital. Accordingly, although no specific new legislation has been introduced, relief for overseas losses will only be available where they may not be utilised in the overseas jurisdiction;
- Cadbury Schweppes – where it was ruled that CFC rules are only acceptable if they relate to wholly artificial arrangements intended to escape the UK tax normally payable.

Also, the case of ICI v Colmer led to the UK amending its definition of a group, for group relief purposes. Previously, the definition required that all companies and intermediate parent companies in a group to be UK resident.

There are also a number of other cases making their way, slowly, up to the European Court. In particular:

- A group litigation order arguing that dividends received from overseas companies should be exempt from tax in the same way as dividends received from UK companies are exempted from tax;
- Claims that the UK CFC legislation is contrary to EU law (notably Vodafone).

== Recent developments ==
=== Corporation tax reform ===
There have been a number of proposals for corporation tax reform, although only a few have been enacted. In March 2001, the government published a technical note A Review of Small Business Taxation, which considered simplification of corporation tax for small companies through the closer alignment of their profits for tax purposes with those reported in their accounts. In July of that year, the government also published a consultation document, Large Business Taxation: the Government's strategy and corporate tax reforms. It set out the strategy for modernising corporate taxes and proposals for relief for capital gains on substantial shareholdings held by companies.

In August 2002, Reform of corporation tax – A consultation document was published, outlining initial proposals for the abolition of the Schedular system. This was followed up in August 2003 by Corporation tax reform – A consultation document, which further discussed the possible abolition of the Schedular system, and also whether the capital allowances (tax depreciation) system should be abolished. It also made proposals that were ultimately enacted in Finance Act 2004. (The first two of these listed below were in response to threats to the UK tax base arising from recent European Court of Justice judgments.) The changes were to:

- Introduction of transfer pricing rules for UK-to-UK transactions. Transfer pricing rules require certain transactions to be deemed to have taken place at arm's length prices for tax purposes where they did not in fact take place as such.
- Merging thin capitalisation rules with the transfer pricing rules. Thin capitalisation rules limit the amount a company can claim as a tax deduction on interest when it receives loans at non-commercial rates (from connected parties, for example).
- Extension of the deduction for management expenses to all companies with an investment business. Previously a company had to be wholly or mainly engaged in an investment business to qualify.

In December 2004, Corporation tax reform – a technical note was published. It outlined the government's decision to abolish the schedular system, replacing the numerous schedules and cases with two pools: a trading and letting pool; and an "everything else" pool. The Government had decided that capital allowances would remain, though there would be some reforms, mostly affecting the leasing industry.

=== Other enactments ===
Other main reforms enacted, include:

- Relief from tax on chargeable gains on disposals of substantial shareholdings in trading companies and groups (enacted by Finance Act 2002).
- Introduction of UK to UK transfer pricing rules, coupled with the merging of the thin capitalisation rules with the transfer pricing rules (enacted by Finance Act 2004).
- Extension of management expenses rules so that companies do not need to be investment companies to receive them, coupled with a specific rule preventing capital items being deductible as management expenses (enacted by Finance Act 2004).

== See also ==
- Taxation in the United Kingdom
- Corporate tax
- UK company law
- Corporation tax in the Republic of Ireland
