= Value-added tax in the United Kingdom =

UK goods and services tax policy

In the United Kingdom, the value added tax (VAT) was introduced in 1973, replacing Purchase Tax, and is the third-largest source of government revenue, after income tax and National Insurance. It is administered and collected by HM Revenue and Customs, primarily through the Value Added Tax Act 1994.

VAT is levied on most goods and services provided by registered businesses in the UK and some goods and services imported from outside the UK. The default VAT rate is the standard rate, 20% since 4 January 2011. Some goods and services are subject to VAT at a reduced rate of 5% (such as domestic fuel) or 0% (such as most food and children's clothing). Others are exempt from VAT or outside the system altogether.

VAT is an indirect tax because the tax is paid to the government by the seller (the business) rather than the person who ultimately bears the economic burden of the tax (the consumer). Opponents of VAT argue that it is a regressive tax because the poorest people spend a higher proportion of their disposable income on VAT than the richest people. Those in favour of VAT claim it is progressive as consumers who spend more pay more VAT.

Following Brexit, European Union value-added tax rules on goods, but not services, continue to apply in Northern Ireland. Therefore changes to VAT rates in Great Britain may not automatically apply to Northern Ireland.

== History ==
Between October 1940 and March 1973 the UK had a consumption tax called Purchase Tax, which was levied at different rates depending on an assessment of goods' luxuriousness. Purchase Tax was applied to the wholesale price, introduced during World War II, initially at a rate of 33.33%. This was doubled in April 1942 to 66.66%, and further increased in April 1943 to a rate of 100%, before reverting in April 1946 to 33.33%. Purchase Tax was applied at the point of manufacture and distribution, not at the point of sale. The rates of Purchase Tax for various classes of goods at the start of 1973, when it gave way to VAT, were 13%, 22%, 36% and 55%.

On 1 January 1973, the UK joined the European Economic Community and as a consequence Purchase Tax was replaced by a value-added tax on 1 April 1973. The Conservative Chancellor Anthony Barber set a single VAT rate (10%) on most goods and services.

In July 1974, Labour Chancellor Denis Healey reduced the standard rate of VAT from 10% to 8% but introduced a new higher rate of 12.5% for petrol and some luxury goods. In November 1974, Healey doubled the higher rate of VAT to 25%. Healey reduced the higher rate to 12.5% in April 1976.

Under Margaret Thatcher's leadership, Conservative Chancellor Geoffrey Howe increased the standard rate of VAT from 8% to 15% and abolished the higher rate in June 1979. The rate remained unchanged until 1991, when Conservative Chancellor Norman Lamont increased it from 15% to 17.5%. The additional revenue was used to pay for a reduction in the hugely unpopular community charge (the "poll tax"). During the 1992 general election the Conservatives promised not to extend the scope of VAT but in March 1993, Lamont announced that domestic fuel and power, which had previously been zero-rated, would have VAT levied at 8% from April 1994 and the full 17.5% from April 1995. The planned introduction of VAT on domestic fuel and power went ahead in April 1994, but the increase from 8% to 17.5% in April 1995 was scuppered in December 1994, after the government lost the vote in parliament.

In its 1997 general election manifesto, the Labour Party pledged to reduce VAT on domestic fuel and power to 5%. After gaining power, the new Labour Chancellor Gordon Brown announced in July 1997 that the lower rate of VAT on domestic fuel and power would be reduced from 8% to 5% with effect from 1 September 1997. In November 1997, Brown announced that the VAT on installation of energy-saving materials would be reduced from 17.5% to 5% from 1 July 1998. Brown subsequently reduced VAT from 17.5% to 5% on sanitary protection products (from 1 January 2001); children's car seats (from 1 April 2001); conversion and renovation of certain residential properties (from 12 May 2001); contraceptives (from 1 July 2006); and smoking cessation products (from 1 July 2007).

In response to the late-2000s recession, Labour Chancellor Alistair Darling announced in November 2008 that the standard rate of VAT would be reduced from 17.5% to 15% with effect from 1 December 2008. However, in December 2009, Darling announced that the standard rate of VAT would return to 17.5% with effect from 1 January 2010.

In the run up to the 2010 general election there were reports that the Conservatives would raise VAT if they gained power. The party denied plans for such an increase, but refused to rule one out for the 2010 budget. Following the election in May 2010, the Conservatives formed a coalition government with the Liberal Democrats. In the 2010 budget, described by PM David Cameron as an "emergency budget", Chancellor George Osborne announced that the standard rate of VAT would increase from 17.5% to 20% with effect from 4 January 2011.

Before the 2015 general election Labour claimed that the Conservatives would raise VAT to 22.5% if they were re-elected and Osborne reputedly refused to deny the claim. On 25 March 2015 Cameron pledged in the House of Commons that VAT would not be increased.

In response to the coronavirus pandemic the UK government introduced zero VAT rating for personal protective equipment (PPE), which was in effect from 1 May to 31 October 2020.

In the March 2020 budget the government announced that it would move women's sanitary products into the zero-rated group, as pledged in the 2016 budget, from 1 January 2021, the first date possible after EU VAT law ceased to apply to the UK.

From 1 March 2021, a domestic VAT reverse charge must be used for most supplies of building, construction and demolition services, meaning that it is the responsibility of the customer, rather than the supplier, to account to HMRC for VAT on the supply of construction services. The reverse charge will not apply where the customer is the end user of the building. The Value Added Tax Regulations 1995 states that invoices for services subject to the reverse charge must include the reference "reverse charge".

As of 1 January 2025, the Labour government extended the 20% VAT to school fees for private schools, which had previously been exempt. Closure of some private schools has been attributed to the resulting increase in fee costs.

== Operation ==
All businesses that provide "taxable" goods and services and whose taxable turnover exceeds the threshold must register for VAT. The threshold as of 2024 is £90,000, by far the highest VAT registration threshold in the world. Businesses may choose to register even if their turnover is less than that amount. All registered businesses must charge VAT on the full sale price of the goods or services that they provide unless exempted or outside the VAT system. The default VAT rate is the standard rate, currently 20%. Some goods and services are charged lower rates (reduced or zero).

Registered businesses must pay over to HMRC the VAT they have charged on their goods or service (known as output tax) but they may offset this with the VAT they have incurred on goods or services they have purchased that relates to their own onward 'taxable' supplies (known as input tax). VAT incurred by businesses that does not relate to their onward making of taxable supplies (whether exempt or from 'non-business' activities) may not be offset from the amount of VAT that is payable to HMRC.

A separate scheme called The Flat Rate Scheme is also run by HMRC. This scheme allows a VAT registered business with a turnover of less than £150,000 (excluding VAT) per annum to pay a fixed percentage of its turnover to HMRC every 3 months. The scheme is designed to reduce red tape for small business and allow new companies to keep some of the VAT they charge to their customers.

Businesses selling exempt goods, supplies or services, such as banks, may not register for VAT or reclaim VAT that they have incurred on purchases. Businesses that sell a mixture of taxable and exempt goods or services can only recover the proportion of the VAT they incur on their purchases that relates to their onward taxable supplies. The rules dealing with 'mixed use' (or 'residual') VAT on purchases are complex. However, businesses that sell zero-rated goods or supplies, such as food producers or booksellers, may reclaim all the VAT they have incurred on purchases.

== Rates ==
There are currently three rates of VAT in the United Kingdom:

Rate	Description	Products and services (examples)
20%	Standard-rate	Most goods and services not listed below; Restaurant meals; Clothing (except children's); Electronics; Furniture; Hairdressing services; Hotel accommodation; Pay TV subscriptions; Mobile phone contracts
5%	Reduced-rate	Energy-saving materials for homes; Home insulation installation; Car seats for children; Residential caravans with no engine; Domestic fuel and power
0%	Zero-rated	Most food (excluding restaurant meals); Children's clothes and shoes; Books and newspapers; Public transport fares; Certain medical equipment

In addition some goods and services are exempt from VAT or outside the VAT system.

=== Historical rates ===
Below are the historical rates of the standard rate of VAT since its introduction in 1973:

From	To	Standard rate
1 April 1973	July 1974	10.0%
July 1974	17 June 1979	8.0%*
18 June 1979	18 March 1991	15.0%
19 March 1991	30 November 2008	17.5%
1 December 2008	31 December 2009	15.0%
1 January 2010	3 January 2011	17.5%
4 January 2011	Present	20.0%

*During this period an alternate VAT rate of 25% and then 12.5% was introduced for petrol and some luxury goods. This was abolished in 1979.

=== Rates on different goods and services ===
The following are the rates applicable to some common goods and services:

==== Standard rated ====
- Alcoholic drinks
- Biscuits (chocolate covered only)
- Bottled water (inc. mineral water)
- Calendars and diaries
- Carbonated (fizzy) drinks
- CDs, DVDs, video games, and tapes
- Cereal bars
- Chocolate
- Clothes and footwear (except for children under 14)
- Confectionery/sweets
- Delivery charges (postage and packaging)
- Electrical goods
- Electricity, gas, heating oil and solid fuel (business)
- Food and drinks supplied for consumption on the premises (at restaurants, cafes etc.) (reduced rate during COVID-19 pandemic of 5% from 15 July 2020 to 30 September 2021 and then of 12.5% from 1 October 2021 to 30 March 2022)
- Hot take-away food and drinks (inc. burgers, hot dogs, toasted sandwiches) (reduced rate during COVID-19 pandemic of 5% from 15 July 2020 to 30 September 2021 and then of 12.5% from 1 October 2021 to 30 March 2022)
- Ice cream
- Fruit juice and other cold drinks (not milk)
- Nuts (shelled, roasted/salted)
- Postal services (Royal Mail/other licensed operators)
- Potato crisps
- Prams and pushchairs
- Road fuel (petrol/diesel)
- Salt (non-culinary)
- Stationery
- Taxi fares
- Tolls for bridges, tunnels and roads (privately operated)
- Water (industrial)

==== Reduced rated ====
- Children's car seats
- Electricity, gas, heating oil and solid fuel (domestic/residential/charity non-business)
- Maternity pads
- Mobility aids for the elderly
- Smoking cessation products

==== Zero rated ====
- Aircraft (sale/charter)
- Bicycle and motorcycle helmets
- Biscuits (not chocolate covered)
- Books, maps and charts (including ebooks)
- Bread, rolls, baps and pitta bread
- Brochures, leaflets and pamphlets
- Building services for disabled people
- Cakes (including Chocolate teacake, Jaffa Cakes)
- Canned and frozen food (not ice cream)
- Cereals
- Chilled/frozen ready meals, convenience foods
- Clothes and footwear (for children under 14 only)
- Construction and sale of new domestic buildings
- Cooking oil
- Donated goods sold at charity shops
- Eggs
- Energy saving materials (permanently installed in residential/charity premises)
- Equipment for disabled people (including the blind or partially sighted)
- Fish (including live fish)
- Fruit & vegetables
- Live animals for human consumption
- Meat & poultry
- Milk, butter, cheese
- Newspapers, magazines and journals
- Nuts & pulses (raw for human consumption)
- Prescription medicine
- Protective boots & helmets (industrial)
- Public transport fares (bus, tram, rail including Tube)
- Salt (culinary)
- Sandwiches (cold)
- Sanitary protection products
- Sewerage (domestic and industrial)
- Shipbuilding (15 tonnes or over)
- Tea, coffee and cocoa
- Transport in a vehicle, boat or aircraft (not fewer than ten passengers)
- Water (household)
- Electricity (household, from October 2026 until March 2027)

==== Exempt ====
- Antiques, works of art or similar, when sold to public institutions
- Burial or cremation (human)
- Commercial land and buildings (selling/leasing/letting)
- Cultural events operated by public bodies (museums, art exhibitions, zoos & performances)
- Education, vocational training
- Financial services (money transactions, loans/credits, savings/deposits, shares/bonds)
- Funeral plan insurance
- Gambling (betting, gaming, bingo, lottery)
- Health services (doctors, dentists, opticians, pharmacists and other health professionals)
- Insurance
- Medical treatment and care
- Membership subscriptions
- Postage stamps
- Sports activities and physical education
- Television licence

==== Outside the scope ====
- Goods and services sold outside the EU
- Goods and services supplied by unregistered supplier
- Statutory fees and services (MOT testing, congestion charge etc.)
- Tolls for bridges, tunnels and roads (operated by public authorities)
- Voluntary donations to charity

== Revenue ==
VAT revenue since 1978/79, in cash terms and as a percentage of total government revenue:

Year	VAT (£bn)	%	Year	VAT (£bn)	%	Year	VAT (£bn)	%	Year	VAT (£bn)	%
1978–79	4.9	6.91%	1993–94	39.2	16.01%	2008–09	78.4	13.78%	2023–24^{1}	161.5	15.27%
1979–80	8.0	9.21%	1994–95	41.7	15.76%	2009–10	70.2	12.44%	2024–25^{1}	167.2	15.14%
1980–81	11.1	10.78%	1995–96	43.1	14.98%	2010–11	83.5	13.84%	2025–26^{1}	171.6	15.09%
1981–82	11.9	9.75%	1996–97	46.6	15.57%	2011–12	98.3	15.73%	2026–27^{1}	175.4	14.82%
1982–83	13.8	10.37%	1997–98	50.6	15.14%	2012–13	100.6	15.79%	2027–28^{1}	180.9	14.70%
1983–84	15.3	10.81%	1998–99	52.3	14.71%	2013–14	104.7	15.77%			
1984–85	18.6	12.26%	1999–00	56.8	14.95%	2014–15	111.4	16.12%			
1985–86	19.4	11.93%	2000–01	58.6	14.42%	2015–16	115.4	16.16%			
1986–87	21.3	12.53%	2001–02	61.0	14.80%	2016–17	119.8	15.81%			
1987–88	24.2	13.09%	2002–03	63.5	15.19%	2017–18	125.4	16.06%			
1988–89	27.2	13.42%	2003–04	69.1	15.28%	2018–19	132.2	16.25%			
1989–90	29.6	13.51%	2004–05	73.0	15.08%	2019–20	129.9	15.72%			
1990–91	30.9	13.42%	2005–06	72.9	13.97%	2020–21	101.7	12.81%			
1991–92	35.3	14.70%	2006–07	77.4	14.01%	2021–22	157.5	17.17%			
1992–93	37.2	15.70%	2007–08	80.6	13.80%	2022–23^{1}	160.1	15.70%			

^{1. Estimated}

== Avoidance, evasion and fraud ==
The UK government loses billions in revenue each year due to VAT avoidance, evasion and fraud. In 2006 the loss was estimated to be between £13bn and £18bn, equivalent to £1 for every £6 of VAT due. The bulk of the lost revenue, about £1 in every £8 of VAT due, is due to evasion. Evasion, which is illegal, occurs when registered businesses pay over to HMRC less than they should. This can be done by understating sales or overstating purchases. Evasion also occurs when businesses do not charge VAT on goods and services they provide even though they are legally obliged to. Cash-in-hand jobs by tradespeople may indicate VAT evasion.

In recent years carousel fraud (also known as missing trader fraud) has increased. Criminal gangs trade goods, such as mobile phones, across EU countries. They do not have to pay VAT, as imports from the EU are not subject to VAT in the UK. The fraud occurs when the criminals sell the goods with VAT in the UK but fail to pass the VAT to HMRC. The goods are often repeatedly shipped around EU countries by criminal gang networks, hence the "carousel" name. According to the HMRC, between £1.1bn and £1.9bn tax revenue was lost in 2004/05 due to carousel fraud. The European Union Emission Trading Scheme has been plagued by carousel fraud.

Until 2012, the Low Value Consignment Relief (LVCR) meant that goods imported from outside the EU through Jersey and costing less than a set amount were not subject to VAT. When the LVCR was introduced in 1983 it was set at about £5 but gradually rose to £18. From 1 November 2011 the LVCR was reduced from £18 to £15. The LVCR allowed online retailers of DVDs and CDs to avoid VAT by importing the goods from the Channel Islands, which are not part of the EU. Major retailers involved in this tax avoidance included Amazon, Asda, HMV, Play.com, Tesco, W H Smith and Woolworths. The tax avoided each year due to LVCR was estimated to be £85m in 2005, £110m in 2008, £130m in 2010 and £140m in 2011. From 1 April 2012 the relief was withdrawn in respect of goods imported to the UK from the Channel Islands.

== Criticism ==
Opponents of VAT claim that it is regressive as it is paid by all consumers whether they are rich or poor, young or old. The poorest also spend a higher proportion of their disposable income on VAT than richest. The Office for National Statistics report showed that in 2009/10 the poorest 20% spent 8.7% of their gross income on VAT, whereas the richest 20% spent only 4.0% of their gross income on VAT. Similarly, the poorest 20% spent 9.7% of their disposable income on VAT, whereas the richest 20% spent only 5.2% of their disposable income on VAT. Supporters of VAT claim VAT is progressive as consumers who spend more pay more VAT. However, according to the definition, VAT is neither progressive nor regressive, since the rate neither increases or decreases with the taxable amount.

The zero rating of food, and the permission for businesses to reclaim input VAT, have been said to mean that the government in effect subsidises the food industry. Critics also argue that VAT is double taxation as consumers pay for goods and services using income that has already been taxed, or that it helps to subsidise automation by not removing worker's wages from the equation. It is also argued that VAT is an inefficient tax owing to the numerous exemptions and concessions.

Benefits of VAT are considered to lie on the state-side. VAT is considered to be a more stable source of income than tax on profits, since the profits are geared, and thus fall at a much faster rate than turnover in economic slowdowns or may drop with an ageing population. VAT, therefore is considered to stabilise treasuries in countries with weak economies. At the same time, as a consumption tax, VAT is considered to be more growth-friendly than income- or profit-taxation.

== See also ==
- Value-added tax
- European Union value added tax
