= November 2022 United Kingdom autumn statement =

- Presented: 17 November 2022
- Country: United Kingdom
- Parliament: 58th
- Party: Conservative Party
- Chancellor: Jeremy Hunt

The November 2022 United Kingdom autumn statement was delivered to the House of Commons on 17 November 2022 by Chancellor of the Exchequer Jeremy Hunt, after being delayed by three weeks from its original scheduled date of 31 October. The budget addressed the ongoing cost of living crisis, and saw the announcement of a five-year package of tax increases and spending cuts designed to steer the UK through recession. An economic forecast published on the same day by the Office for Budget Responsibility (OBR) stated the UK had entered a recession after experiencing two quarters of a shrinking economy, and predicted the UK's economy would shrink during 2023. A reduction in households' disposable income was also forecast.

In his statement, Hunt committed to maintaining scheduled public spending plans until 2025, but said that spending would slow after then. He also lowered the threshold at which earners become eligible to pay the top rate of income tax, and announced an increase in the National Minimum Wage, as well as increases for pensions and benefits in line with inflation. The Energy Price Guarantee was extended to April 2023, but raised from £2,500 to £3,000. Shadow Chancellor Rachel Reeves described the measures as "an invoice for the economic carnage" caused by the government of Liz Truss.

== Background ==
The autumn statement was delivered by Chancellor Jeremy Hunt in the aftermath of the mini-budget set out by his predecessor, Kwasi Kwarteng, who served as Chancellor in Liz Truss's brief government. That statement, outlined in September 2022 by Kwarteng, had been a programme of low taxation and high spending worth £45bn which it was hoped would promote economic growth, but had instead it led to economic turmoil, a weaker pound and financial intervention in the UK's bond markets by the Bank of England to prevent them from collapsing. With a budget deficit of £30bn–£40bn, the markets were concerned as to how this debt would be paid for. Truss and Kwarteng subsequently conceded to failing to prepare the ground for the mini-budget, but argued it had been impacted negatively by global events. After Hunt replaced Kwarteng as Chancellor in October he reversed the majority of the mini-budget's measures in an emergency statement to the House of Commons. A further statement providing a medium term fiscal plan had been scheduled for 31 October by Kwarteng, and an accompanying forecast from the Office for Budget Responsibility was due to be published on the same day, but after Hunt was retained as Chancellor by Truss's successor, Rishi Sunak, he deferred the statement until 17 November, announcing at the same time that its scope would be expanded into a full autumn statement that could outline longer term plans. By then, the markets had stabilised, and official projections suggested the interest on the government's debt could be up to £10bn lower than previously thought. Hunt argued that deferring the date would allow the statement to be based on "accurate economic forecasts".

On 3 November the Bank of England raised the base rate of interest by 0.75% to 3%, the largest single interest rate rise since 1989, and warned of a recession lasting at least two years. On 11 November, figures released by the Office for National Statistics showed the UK economy had shrunk by 0.2% between July and September 2022. Speaking to the BBC's Laura Kuenssberg on 13 November, Hunt said that his statement would include details of further help for people facing high energy bills once the Energy Price Guarantee expires in April 2023, and warned taxes would need to rise: "I've been explicit that taxes are going to go up". On 15 November, it was reported that inflation had reached 11.1% during October, up from 10.1% the previous month, and its highest since 1981. On the same day, and while attending the 17th G20 Summit in Bali, Sunak said the priority would be to reduce inflation, and that decisions taken in the forthcoming autumn statement would be done in a "fair" way that would mean everyone benefitting from reduced levels of debt.

There was some discussion about the actual size of the UK's debt after it emerged the government had changed the way debt is calculated. On 10 November, the Progressive Economy Forum, a centre-left think tank, questioned the actual size of the "black hole" and whether tax rises and austerity measures would be needed to fill it. The think tank argued that calculating the debt under the previously used method would show a gap of £14bn rather than the generally accepted figure which was estimated at the time to be as high as £50bn. In response, HM Treasury said that public finances would be assessed independently by the Office for Budgetary Responsibility. The OBR subsequently said there was a £55bn gap in public finances.

== The statement ==
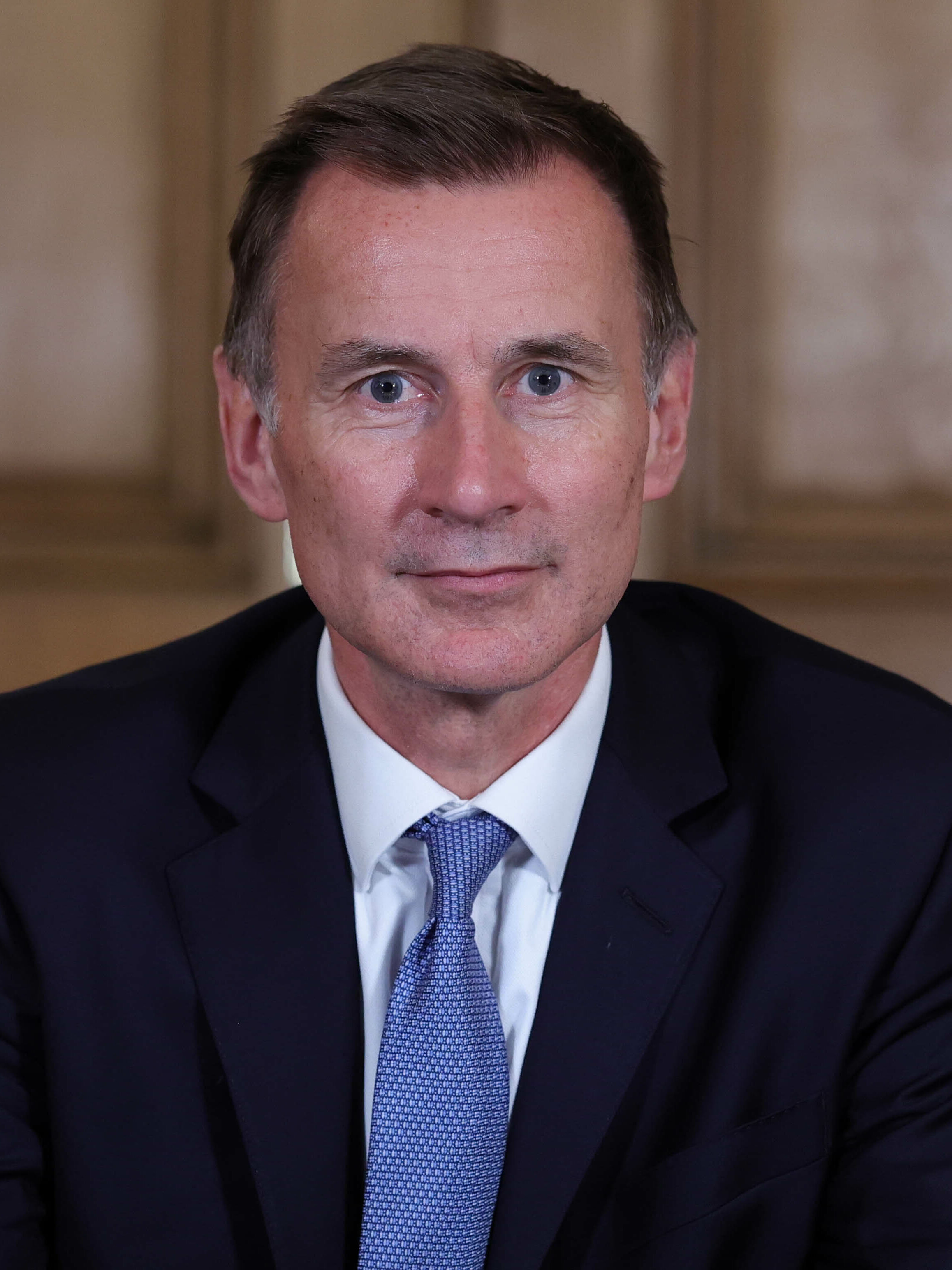
Jeremy Hunt was appointed Chancellor of the Exchequer after Kwasi Kwarteng was sacked by Liz Truss on 14 October 2022. He retained his role as chancellor under Rishi Sunak following Truss' resignation.

The statement, which Hunt described as being made "in the face of unprecedented global headwinds", set out a five-year programme of tax increases and spending cuts worth £55bn that the Chancellor argued would lead to a "shallower downturn" with fewer jobs lost. It would see an overall increase in government spending over the coming two years, with a commitment to maintain public spending targets until 2025. Hunt said the programme of measures would help to curb inflation, something that had led to a fall in living standards and "real challenges" for families as a result. He said of his predecessor, Kwasi Kwarteng, that he had been "correct" to prioritise growth in the September mini-budget, but added that "unfunded tax cuts are as risky as unfunded spending".

In its report, published at the same time as the autumn statement, the Office for Budget Responsibility (OBR) concluded the UK had entered a recession after experiencing two quarters in which the economy had shrunk. While predicting an overall growth of 4.2% for 2022, the OBR forecast the economy would shrink by around 1.4% during 2023. After that, however, it predicted growth for the years 2024–2026, with 1.3% in 2024, 2.6% in 2025, and 2.7% in 2026. The rate of inflation was predicted to be 9.1% in 2022 and 7.4% in 2023. Unemployment was expected to rise from 3.6% to 4.9% by 2024. The OBR also forecast that disposable income would fall by 7.1% over the next two years, taking it to its lowest level since records began in 1956–57, and reducing incomes to 2013 levels.

=== Key points ===
- Government to extend the period by which it plans to hit its debt and spending targets from three to five years
- Scheduled public spending plans to be maintained until 2025, but will grow more slowly after that
- England's NHS budget will increase by £3.3bn a year during 2023–24 and 2024–25, and spending on schools by £2.3bn over the same period
- Defence spending to be maintained at 2% of national income
- Overseas aid spending to remain at 0.5% until 2028, below the official 0.7% target
- Devolved governments to receive extra funding over 2023–24 and 2024–25, amounting to an extra £1.5bn for Scotland, £1.2bn for Wales, and £650m for Northern Ireland.
- Support worth £13.6bn for businesses over next five years, including help with business rates
- Two year suspension of import taxes on over 100 goods, including some food products
- Plans for potential Online Sales Tax scrapped to protect online retailers, who will be impacted more severely than shops by changes to business rates
- Review announced into how post-Brexit regulation can support emerging technologies (to be led by Sir Patrick Vallance)
- An increase in the National Minimum Wage from £9.50 to £10.42 an hour for all those aged 23 or over from April 2023
- A 10.1% rise in state pension, means tested benefit and disability benefit payments, increasing them in line with inflation
- The triple lock for calculating the basic state pension is retained
- A change in the threshold for the 45% tax rate, which will be paid on earnings over £125,140 rather than £150,000 (excludes Scotland)
- Income tax personal allowance and higher rate thresholds frozen for further two years, until April 2028 instead of April 2026
- Main National Insurance and inheritance tax thresholds frozen for further two years, until April 2028 instead of April 2026
- Reduction in tax-free allowances for dividends and capital gains tax in both 2023 and 2024
- Local authorities given the power to annually increase council tax by up to 5% without a local referendum instead of the current 3%
- Household Energy Price Guarantee extended until April 2024, but threshold raised from £2,500 to £3,000
- Energy support payments for 2023–24 to be set at £900 for households on means tested benefits, £300 for pensioners and £150 for those claiming disability benefits
- Windfall tax on profits of oil and gas companies increased from 25% to 35% and extended until March 2028
- Introduction of a 45% tax on companies generating electricity, effective from January 2023
- Lifetime cap on social care costs in England delayed from October 2023 until October 2025
- A 7% cap on social housing rent increases in England from April 2023 reduced from 11%
- Electric cars, vans and motorcycles to pay road taxes from April 2025
- Directly elected mayors announced for Norfolk, Suffolk, and Cornwall, as well as a to be confirmed area of North East England
- The Sizewell C nuclear power plant will go ahead
- HS2, Northern Powerhouse Rail and East West Rail will go ahead as planned
- An extra £6bn announced to improve the quality of housing stock

== Reaction ==
Responding to the statement, Rachel Reeves, the Shadow Chancellor, described Hunt as having "picked the pockets" of the country with "stealth taxes", and called the measures announced by him "an invoice for the economic carnage" caused by the Government of Liz Truss. But Hunt said the measures would get the UK through an economic "storm". Nicola Sturgeon, the First Minister of Scotland, described the statement as "repeating mistakes of the past" and "a reintroduction of austerity".

Although generally positive, market response to the autumn statement was described by the Financial Times as being "muted". William Hobbs, chief investment officer at Barclays Wealth said that the "grown-up tone and the mostly orthodox thinking" behind the budget "seem to have been well received", while Anna Macdonald, fund manager at Amati Global Investors, saw opportunities for investors: "We still see a lot of pressure and a lack of confidence in domestically exposed equities. But selectively they are looking like very good value now."

The Office for Budget Responsibility stated the UK was in a recession that would cancel eight years of growth and UK households would experience the largest fall in living standards since records began. The Resolution Foundation suggested the autumn statement had increased pressure on "the squeezed middle" of wage earners, and extended the real wage recovery lag to 19 years, meaning that real wages would not return to 2008 levels until 2027, leaving wage earners £292 a week (roughly £15,000 a year) worse off than they would have been. The Financial Times noted that much of the revenue the Chancellor planned to raise would be through what it described as "stealth taxes" – the freezing of allowances and thresholds – which would push millions of taxpayers into paying higher taxes through rising wages. Tim Stovold, of accountants Moore Kingston Smith, described the statement as "a reasonably soft landing" for very high earners, who had been warned that "those with the broadest shoulders would pay the most" – a situation that had not materialised.

In its analysis of the autumn statement, the Institute for Fiscal Studies said that the most difficult decisions had been postponed until after 2024, and that the UK was entering a "new era" of high taxation. Laura Kuenssberg, the BBC's political editor, questioned whether those difficult decisions would ever be made: "Perhaps after all, the cuts pencilled in for just after the next election may never come to pass. Chancellors have found it tempting to push their attempts to balancing the books back and back."

Addressing the £55bn gap in public finances, and following debate about its accuracy, Labour Party leader Sir Keir Starmer said he did not dispute the Office for Budget Responsibility's forecast, and that Labour would seek to "repair the damage" if it were to win the 2024 general election.

Tony Danker of the Confederation of British Industry said Hunt had prioritised stability and the battle against inflation over economic growth in the Autumn Statement. Danker said higher growth was also needed to fund the growing health and social care costs. Danker also stated that nothing in the plan indicates the economy will avoid a further "decade of low productivity and low growth".

Responding to criticism of the decision to delay the cap on the amount of money people would have to pay towards their social care, Steve Barclay, the Secretary of State for Health and Social Care, told the 20 November edition of BBC One's political programme, Sunday with Laura Kuenssberg, it had been a "difficult decision" but that delaying its introduction for two years would allow more money to be invested in social care.

== See also ==
- Autumn Statement
