= June 1979 United Kingdom budget =

1979 United Kingdom budget
- Presented: 12 June 1979
- Country: United Kingdom
- Parliament: 48th
- Party: Conservative Party
- Chancellor: Geoffrey Howe

The June 1979 United Kingdom budget was delivered by Geoffrey Howe, the Chancellor of the Exchequer, to the House of Commons on 12 June 1979. It was Howe's first budget and the first of the first Thatcher ministry, which had been elected a few weeks earlier. It was also the second budget to be delivered to Parliament in 1979. The budget marked a major change in direction for the UK economy, with an increase in reliance on interest rates and monetary policy to control inflation. It is also noted for its introduction of substantial tax cuts, such as reducing the top rate of income tax from 83% to 60% and the basic rate from 33% to 30%. The budget also saw an increase in VAT from 8% to 15%.

In his budget speech, Howe told the House of Commons "we cannot go on avoiding difficult choices".

== Background ==
The Conservative Party had pledged to reduce taxes while campaigning in the 1979 general election. At the time the United Kingdom's public borrowing deficit was approaching £10bn. The party's election manifesto for that year stated "We shall cut income tax at all levels...a gradual reduction in the size of the Government's income requirement is vital...any future government which sets out to reduce inflation and taxation will have to make substantial economies". Following the Conservatives' election, the budget was held on 12 June. It heralded a significant change in direction for the UK economy, with an increase in reliance on interest rates and monetary policy to control inflation.

== Key points ==
- VAT raised from 8% on most goods (12.5% on luxury goods) to a single rate of 15%
- Basic rate of income tax cut from 33% to 30%; top rate cut from 83% to 60%
- Government sets a long term target of 25% income tax rate
- Reductions in public spending announced
- Interest rates increased from 12% to 14%
- Prescription charges increased from 20p to 45p
- A major relaxation of exchange controls

== Reaction ==
Howe's decision to raise VAT was highlighted by the government's critics, who cited the Conservatives' rejection of a pre-election Labour Party press release that had claimed VAT would be doubled if the Conservatives were elected.

The Conservatives reduced the basic rate of income tax to 25% in 1988.
