= Advance corporation tax =

Former United Kingdom government policy

In the United Kingdom, the advance corporation tax (ACT) was part of a partial dividend imputation system introduced in 1973 under which companies were required to withhold tax on dividends before they were distributed to shareholders. The scheme was similar to the way banks were required to withhold an amount at a set rate on interest earned on bank deposits before it is paid to the account holder.

In general, this payment meant that the recipients of the dividend were considered to have already paid basic rate tax on the dividend income. Non-taxpayers, such as pension funds, who would not otherwise have paid income tax on the dividend income, became entitled to claim a refund of the ACT amount, or after 1993 a lesser amount. The refund of ACT for non-taxpayers was scrapped in 1997, and in 1999 the ACT was itself scrapped, effectively making dividend income of non-taxpayers tax-free again.

The amount of ACT paid by a company could also be offset against the company's profits reducing its final corporation tax bill. The ACT was scrapped in 1999.

== History ==
Until 1973, company profits were taxed as profits, and dividend payments were then taxed as income. In 1973, a partial imputation system was introduced for dividend payments, under which companies were required to withhold tax on dividends, called an advance corporation tax, before they were distributed to shareholders. UK companies could set off the ACT amount withheld against the overall company tax liability, subject to certain limits. (The full amount of ACT paid could not be recovered if significantly large amounts of profits were distributed.) Shareholders of a UK company who received a dividend received a tax credit representing the ACT paid, which could be set off against their overall income tax liability. Non-taxable shareholders, such as pension funds, were entitled to a refund of the ACT amount.

When introduced in 1973, the ACT rate on the gross dividend (the amount distributed plus the ACT withheld) was 30%, the basic rate of income tax at the time. Until 1993 the income tax rate payable on dividends was the same as all other income, and the ACT rate was adjusted to align it to changes in the basic rate of income tax. From April 1993, the ACT rate was cut to 22.5% while the tax rate on dividend income was set at 20%, the first time it was set at a different rate to that payable on other income (25%). The tax credit was tied to the 20% rate rather than the ACT rate of 22.5%, meaning that non-taxpayers could no longer claim a refund for the full amount that had previously been paid as ACT. The ACT rate was cut to 20% from April 1994.

In 1997, the tax credit was scrapped for non-taxpayers (except charities and PEPs), which had a particular impact on pension funds, which could no longer claim a refund for any amount that had previously been paid as ACT. The effect of the change was that pension funds became effectively taxed on dividend income by way of the now non-refundable ACT, thus lowering pension returns and allegedly resulting in the winding up of some pension funds. Treasury argued that the change was crucial to long-term economic growth: the existing corporation tax system created biased incentives for corporations to pay out profits as dividends to shareholders (including pension funds, who could then reclaim the tax paid) rather than to reinvest them into company growth (which would result in corporation tax being paid). The old system of corporation tax was widely viewed by economists as a constraint on British economic growth. The Times obtained documents under the Freedom of Information Act in April 2007 that showed the chancellor Gordon Brown had been advised that pension funds would suffer a £67 billion loss of the actuarial value of their assets as a net result of a combination of policies including the ACT change.

ACT was scrapped from 6 April 1999, and replaced by a tax credit on dividend income of 10%. From 6 April 2016, the tax credit was itself abolished and replaced with a tax-free dividend allowance of £5,000.

== See also ==
- Dividend imputation
- United Kingdom corporation tax
