= Permanent establishment =

Fixed place of business

A permanent establishment (PE) is a fixed place of business that generally gives rise to income or value-added tax liability in a particular jurisdiction. The term is defined in many income tax treaties and in most European Union Value Added Tax systems. The tax systems in some civil-law countries impose income taxes and value-added taxes only where an enterprise maintains a PE in the country concerned.For example, Germany taxes non-German companies only on income from a PE. Definitions of PEs under tax law or tax treaties may contain specific inclusions or exclusions.

== History ==
The concept of PE emerged in the German Empire after 1845, culminating with the German Double Taxation Act of 1909. Initially, the objective was to prevent double taxation between Prussian municipalities, and this was extended to the entire German federation. In 1889, the first bilateral tax treaty, including the concept of PE, was concluded between the Austro-Hungarian Empire and Prussia, marking the first time the concept was used in international tax law. After years of preparatory works, in 1928, the League of Nations developed a model to tackle cross-border double taxation and to counter tax evasion. Since then, an extensive network of bilateral tax treaties was gradually established, particularly through the influence of the OECD Model Tax Convention, where this concept persisted.

== Types ==
In the OECD Model Tax Convention, essentially three types of PEs can be construed:

- A fixed place of business PE (article 5(1));
- A construction or project PE, which is a special subset of the fixed place of business PE, with different requirements (article 5(3)); and
- An agency PE, through the actions of a dependent agent (article 5(5-6)).

The UN Model Tax Convention, which gives greater consideration to developing countries, adds what is known as a service PE in article 5(3)b. Some countries, such as Saudi Arabia, have been trying to extend the concept of service PE into a virtual service PE.

Under the Base Erosion and Profit Shifting project being developed by the OECD and endorsed by the G20, a new nexus based on significant digital presence is being considered under Action 1, aimed at Addressing the Tax Challenges of the Digital Economy.

== Fixed place of business ==
The starting point for determination if a PE exists is generally a fixed place of business. The definition of PE in article 5 of the OECD Model Income Tax Treaty is followed in most income tax treaties.

The commentary indicates that a fixed place of business has three components:

- Fixed refers to a link between the place of business and a specific geographic point, as well as a degree of permanence with respect to the taxpayer. An "office hotel" may constitute a fixed place for a business for an enterprise that regularly uses different offices within the space. By contrast, if there is no commercial coherence, the fact that activities may be conducted within a limited geographic area should not result in that area being considered a fixed place of business.
- A place of business. This refers to some facilities used by an enterprise for carrying out its business. The premises must be at the disposal of the enterprise. The mere presence of the enterprise at that place does not necessarily mean that it is a place of business of the enterprise. The facilities need not be the exclusive location, and they need not be used exclusively by that enterprise or for that business. However, the facilities must be those of the taxpayer, not another unrelated person. Thus, regular use of a customer's premises does not generally constitute a place of business.
- Business of the enterprise must be carried on wholly or partly at the fixed place.

The requirements of what constitutes a PE within the scope of a particular treaty depend on what interpretation a particular country places on that term, in context of the text of that treaty. As per Article 3 of the Vienna Convention on the Law of Treaties, no one is entitled to claim rights under a particular treaty unless otherwise authorised by the contracting state. Therefore, if a particular contracting state places a different meaning on the term 'permanent establishment' than what the taxpayer seeks to place, the taxpayer would be left with virtually no remedy within that state, other than to seek a mutual agreement to that dispute with the other contracting state to that treaty.

== Indicative list of permanent establishments ==
The OECD Model Tax Convention includes a short indicative list of prima facie PEs. These, however, are not automatically PEs as the requirements set out, namely, for a fixed place of business PE must be met. The list is as follows:

- A branch
- A warehouse (but see excluded places below)
- A factory
- A mine or place of extraction of natural resources
- A place of management

== Specifically excluded places ==
Many treaties explicitly exclude from the definition of PE places if certain activities are conducted. Generally, these exclusions do not apply if non-excluded activities are conducted at the fixed place of business. Among the excluded activities are:

- Ancillary or preparatory activities
- The use of a storage facility solely for delivery of goods to customers
- The maintenance of a stock of goods owned by the enterprise solely for purposes of processing by another enterprise (sometimes referred to as toll processing)
- Purchasing or information gathering activities

== Other specific provisions ==
=== Construction or Project PE ===
Many treaties provide specific rules with respect to construction sites. Under those treaties, a building site or construction or installation project constitutes a PE only if it lasts more than a specified length of time. The amount of time varies by treaty.

=== Agency PE ===
In addition, the activities of a dependent agent may give rise to a PE for the principal. Dependent agents may include employees or others under the control of the principal. A company is generally not considered an agent solely by reason of ownership of the agent company by the principal. However, activities of an independent agent generally are not attributed to the principal.

=== Service PE ===
Some treaties deem a PE to exist for an enterprise of one country performing services in the other country for more than a specified length of time or for a related enterprise.

== BEPS Action 7 and 15 ==
In October 2015, the OECD released the final reports on the Base Erosion and Profit Shifting (BEPS) project. Action 7 was targeted at Preventing the Artificial Avoidance of Permanent Establishment Status and proposes a large number of changes that are set to be included in the next version of the OECD Model Tax Convention. The OECD expects many of these changes to be applied to currently existing tax treaties through the work based on Action 15 on Developing a Multilateral Instrument to Modify Bilateral Tax Treaties. A large number of countries are involved in the negotiations that are expected to be concluded by the end of 2016.

The final report on Action 7 proposes substantial changes to the definition of Agency PE and stricter requirements to the exclusions provision:

"These changes will ensure that where the activities that an intermediary exercises in a country are intended to result in the regular conclusion of contracts to be performed by a foreign enterprise, that enterprise will be considered to have a taxable presence in that country unless the intermediary is performing these activities in the course of an independent business.

The changes will also restrict the application of a number of exceptions to the definition of permanent establishment to activities that are preparatory or auxiliary nature and will ensure that it is not possible to take advantage of these exceptions by the fragmentation of a cohesive operating business into several small operations; they will also address situations where the exception applicable to construction sites is circumvented through the splitting-up contracts between closely related enterprises."
