= Political history of the United Kingdom (1979–present) =

Modern Britain
- 4 May 1979 – present
Postwar era
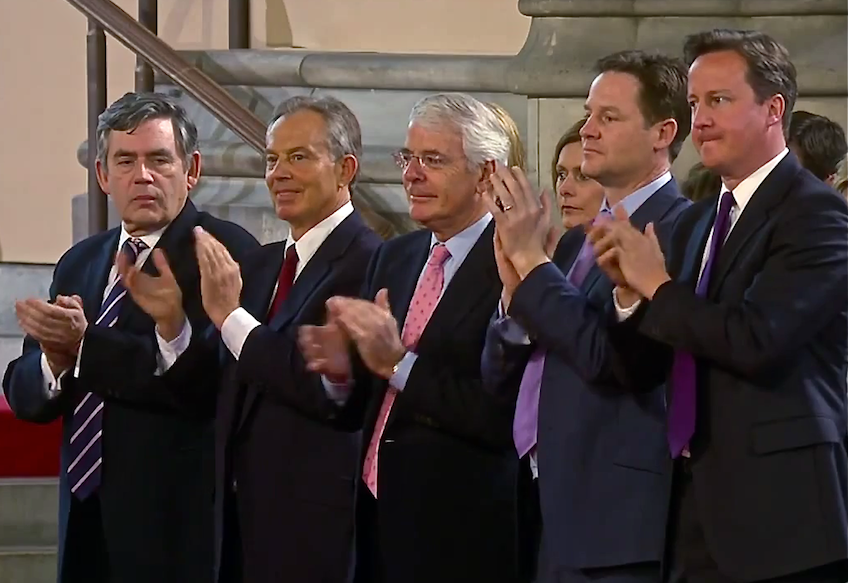
- Former prime ministers Gordon Brown (2007–2010), Tony Blair (1997–2007), John Major (1990–1997), then-Deputy Prime Minister Nick Clegg and then-Prime Minister David Cameron pictured together in 2011
- Monarchs: Elizabeth II; Charles III
- Leaders: Margaret Thatcher; John Major; Tony Blair; Gordon Brown; David Cameron; Theresa May; Boris Johnson; Liz Truss; Rishi Sunak; Keir Starmer; Andy Burnham

The modern political history of the United Kingdom (1979–present) began when Margaret Thatcher gained power in 1979, giving rise to 18 years of Conservative government. Victory in the Falklands War (1982) and the government's strong opposition to trade unions helped lead the Conservative Party to another three terms in government. Thatcher initially pursued monetarist policies and went on to privatise many of Britain's nationalised companies such as British Telecom, British Gas Corporation, British Airways and British Steel Corporation. She kept the National Health Service. The controversial "poll tax" to fund local government was unpopular, and eventually led to a leadership challenge triggered by Michael Heseltine. Thatcher initially intended to fight the leadership election to the end, but eventually stepped down as party leader, having failed to accrue enough support to win. She was succeeded by the eventual winner, John Major.

Thatcher's successor, John Major, replaced the "poll tax" with Council Tax and oversaw successful British involvement in the Gulf War. Despite a recession, Major led the Conservatives to a surprise victory in 1992. The events of Black Wednesday in 1992, party disunity over the European Union and several scandals involving Conservative politicians all led to the Labour Party winning a landslide election victory under Tony Blair in 1997. Labour had shifted its policies from the political left closer to the centre, under the slogan of 'New Labour'. The Bank of England was given independence over monetary policy and Scotland and Wales were given a devolved Scottish Parliament and Welsh Assembly respectively, whilst London wide local government was also re-established in the form of an Assembly and Mayor. The Good Friday Agreement was negotiated in 1997 in an effort to end The Troubles in Northern Ireland, with a devolved, power-sharing Northern Ireland Assembly being established in 1998.

Blair led Britain into the Afghanistan and Iraq Wars before leaving office in 2007, when he was succeeded by his chancellor, Gordon Brown. The 2008 financial crisis led to Labour's defeat in the 2010 election. It was replaced by a Conservative-Liberal Democrat coalition government, headed by David Cameron, that pursued a series of public spending cuts with the intention of reducing the budget deficit. In 2016, the UK voted in an advisory referendum to leave the European Union, which led to Cameron's resignation. Cameron was succeeded by his home secretary, Theresa May.

May engaged in a policy to take the country out of the European Union through her flagship Brexit withdrawal agreement. When this deal failed to pass through the House of Commons three times, May resigned. The subsequent Conservative leadership election was won by former Foreign Secretary and Mayor of London, Boris Johnson, who became prime minister in July 2019. A Conservative landslide victory in the general election five months later allowed for a majority government and the UK's withdrawal from the EU in January 2020. Amid numerous scandals and a government crisis, Johnson resigned in September 2022 and was succeeded by his Foreign Secretary Liz Truss. She was appointed prime minister by Queen Elizabeth II, just two days before the latter's death. Amid yet another government crisis, Truss resigned seven weeks into her tenure in October 2022, and was succeeded by Rishi Sunak, the first prime minister to be appointed during the reign of King Charles III. The Conservatives' popularity remained low after the successive government crises, all led to the Labour Party winning a landslide election victory under Keir Starmer in 2024. Following sustained low approval ratings, Starmer resigned amid a leadership crisis within the Labour Party and was succeeded by Andy Burnham in July 2026.

== Conservative Government, 1979–1997 ==
=== Margaret Thatcher (1979–1990) ===
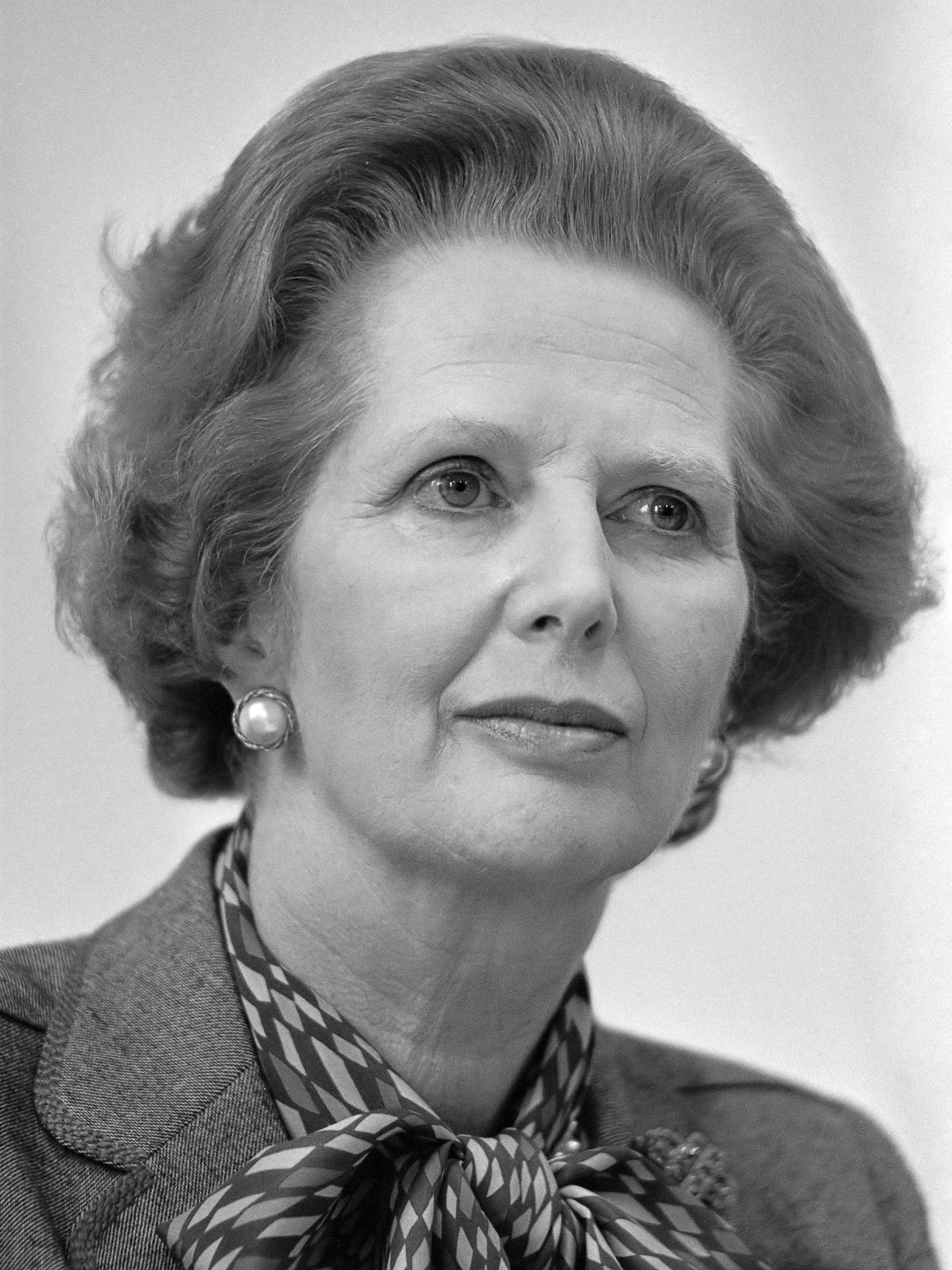
Margaret Thatcher in 1983

Thatcher formed a government on 4 May 1979, in a political landscape that had been majorly changed by the Winter of Discontent and had lead to an anti-union sentiment leading up to the 1979 general election. Thatcher was elected on a platform of rebuilding the UK's economy and restoring hope during a divided period. Thatcher was incensed by one contemporary view within the Civil Service that its job was to manage the UK's decline from the days of Empire, and wanted the country to punch above its weight in international affairs. She was ideologically similar to Ronald Reagan, elected President in 1980 in the United States, and to a lesser extent, Brian Mulroney, who was elected in 1984 in Canada. It seemed for a time that conservatism might be the dominant political philosophy in the major English-speaking nations for the era.

==== Irish issues ====
Northern Ireland was in a violent phase. Insurgents planted bombs and assassinated its foes, including in 1979 Airey Neave, Thatcher's close friend who was expected to take charge there. The Irish National Liberation Army (INLA), a republican paramilitary group, claimed responsibility. On 27 August 1979, the IRA assassinated Lord Mountbatten, a member of the royal family, and other units killed 18 soldiers with a roadside bomb. Sheer luck on the early morning of 12 October 1984 saved Thatcher's life as five were killed by a bomb planted by the Provisional Irish Republican Army in Brighton's Grand Hotel during the Conservative Party conference.

In 1981, a new tactic was used to mobilize support, as Provisional IRA and Irish National Liberation Army prisoners went on hunger strikes to claim legitimacy for their cause in the act of making the ultimate sacrifice. It was a historic tactic that was revived for maximum impact, although it was attacked by the major news media and denounced by Catholic bishops.

Thatcher continued the policy of "Ulsterisation" promoted by the previous Labour government, believing that the unionists of Ulster should be at the forefront in combating Irish republicanism. This meant relieving the burden on the mainstream British Army and elevating the role of the Ulster Defence Regiment and the Royal Ulster Constabulary.

In November 1985, Thatcher signed the Hillsborough Anglo-Irish Agreement, bringing the Dublin government into the peace process. P. J. McLoughlin finds the consensus of scholars is that it was a significant factor contributing to the development of the Northern Ireland peace process. However, the agreement was greeted with fury by Irish unionists. The Ulster Unionists and Democratic Unionists made an electoral pact and on 23 January 1986, staged an ad hoc referendum by re-fighting their seats in by-elections, and won with one seat lost to the nationalist Social Democratic and Labour Party (SDLP). Then, unlike the Sunningdale Agreement in 1974, they found they could not bring the agreement down by a general strike. This was another effect of the changed balance of power in industrial relations. The Hillsborough agreement stood, and Thatcher punished the unionists for their non-cooperation by abolishing the devolved assembly she had created only four years before.

==== Economics ====
In economic policy, Thatcher and her Chancellor Sir Geoffrey Howe started out with policies, including higher interest rates, to drive down the rate of growth of the money supply. She had a preference for indirect taxation over taxes on income: in 1979 exchange controls were abolished and the top rate of income tax on "unearned" income cut from 98% to 60%, but value-added tax (VAT) was increased sharply to 15% with the result that inflation also rose. These moves hit businesses, especially in the manufacturing sector, and unemployment – which had stood at 1,500,000 by the time of the 1979 general election – was above 2,000,000 by the end of 1980. It continued to rise throughout 1981, passing the 2,500,000 mark during the summer of that year – although inflation was now down to 12% compared to 27% two years earlier. The economy was now in recession.

Her early tax policy reforms were based on the monetarist theories of Milton Friedman rather than the supply-side economics of Arthur Laffer and Jude Wanniski, which the government of Ronald Reagan espoused. There was a severe recession in the early 1980s, and the Government's economic policy was widely blamed. In January 1982, the inflation rate dropped to single figures and interest rates fell. Unemployment peaked at 3.1 million and remained at that level until 1986. The recession of the early 1980s was the deepest in Britain since the depression of the 1930s and Thatcher's popularity plummeted; most predictions had her losing the next election.

==== Falklands War ====
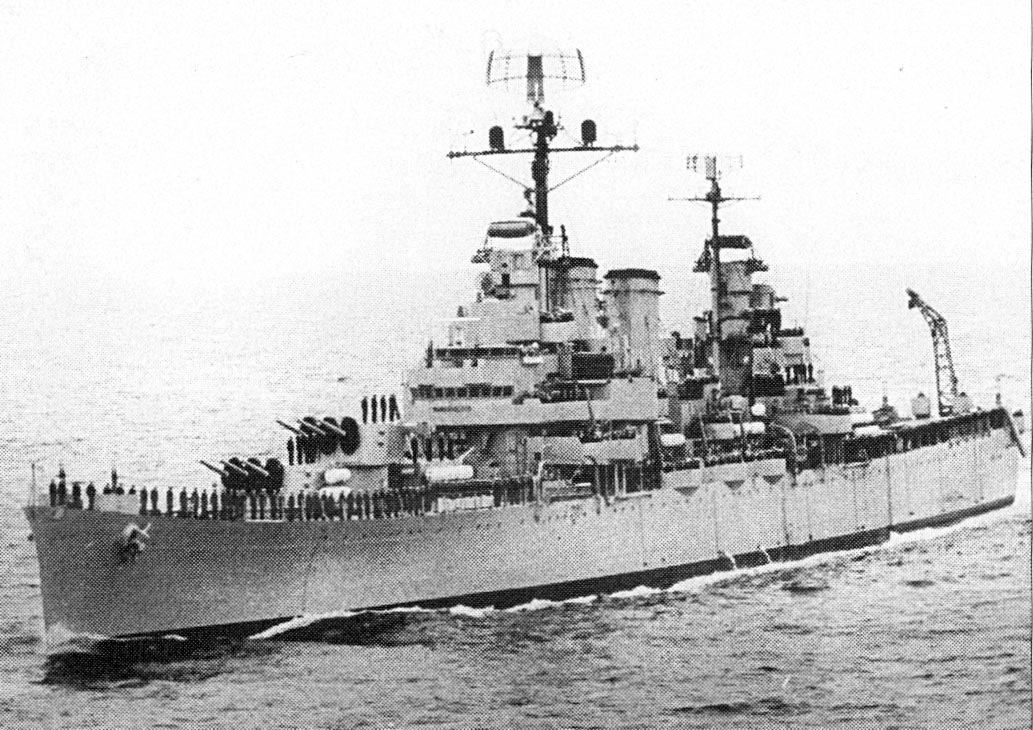
The British sank the Argentine cruiser ARA General Belgrano during the Falklands War.

In Argentina, an unstable military junta was in power and keen on reversing its huge economic unpopularity. On 2 April 1982, it invaded the Falkland Islands, the only invasion of a British territory since World War II. Argentina has claimed the islands since an 1830s dispute on their settlement. Thatcher sent a naval task force to recapture the Islands. The ensuing Falklands War saw the swift defeat of Argentina in only a few days of fighting, resulting in a wave of patriotic enthusiasm for Thatcher personally, at a time when her popularity had been at an all-time low for a serving prime minister. Opinion polls showed a huge surge in Conservative support which would be sufficient to win a general election. In the end, the war probably raised the Conservative vote by about six points, according to scholarly studies of the polling data.

This "Falklands Factor", as it came to be known, was crucial to the scale of the landslide Conservative majority in the June 1983 general election, with a fragmented Labour Party enduring its worst postwar election result, while the SDP–Liberal Alliance (created two years earlier in a pact between the Liberal Party and the new Social Democratic Party (UK) formed by disenchanted former Labour MPs) trailed Labour closely in terms of votes but won few seats.

==== Hong Kong ====
China demanded the return of Hong Kong with the expiration of Britain's 99-year lease on most of the territory in 1997. Thatcher negotiated directly in September 1982 with that country's leader Deng Xiaoping. They agreed on the Sino-British Joint Declaration over the Question of Hong Kong which provided for a peaceful transfer of Hong Kong to Beijing's control in 15 years' time, after which the city would be allowed to retain its "capitalistic" system for another 50 years.

Thatcher's strong opposition against communism as represented by the Soviet Union as well as the decisive military victory against Argentina, re-affirmed Britain's influential position on the world stage and bolstered Thatcher's firm leadership. In addition the economy was showing positive signs of recovery thanks mainly to substantial oil revenues from the North Sea.

==== Nuclear disarmament ====
The 1983 election was also influenced by events in the opposition parties. Since their 1979 defeat, Labour was increasingly dominated by its "hard left" that had emerged from the 1970s union militancy, and in opposition its policies had swung very sharply to the left while the Conservatives had drifted further to the right. This drove a significant number of right wing Labour members and MPs to form a breakaway party in 1981, the Social Democratic Party. Labour fought the election on unilateral nuclear disarmament, which proposed to abandon the British nuclear deterrent despite the threat from a nuclear armed Soviet Union, withdrawal from the European Economic Community, and total reversal of Thatcher's economic and trade union changes. Indeed, one Labour MP, Gerald Kaufman, has called the party's 1983 manifesto "the longest suicide note in history". Consequently, upon the Labour split, there was a new centrist challenge, the SDP–Liberal Alliance, from the Social Democrats in electoral pact with the Liberal Party, to break the major parties' dominance and win proportional representation. The British Electoral Study found that Alliance voters were preferentially tilted towards the Conservatives , but this possible loss of vote share by the Conservatives was more than compensated for by the first past the post electoral system, where marginal changes in vote numbers and distribution have disproportionate effects on the number of seats won. Accordingly, despite the Alliance vote share coming very close to that of Labour and preventing an absolute majority in votes for the Conservatives, the Alliance failed to break into Parliament in significant numbers and the Conservatives were returned in a landslide.

==== Trade union power ====
Thatcher was committed to reducing the power of the trade unions but, unlike the Heath government, adopted a strategy of incremental change rather than a single Act. Several unions launched strikes that were wholly or partly aimed at damaging her politically. The most significant of these was carried out by the National Union of Mineworkers (NUM). However, Thatcher had made preparations long in advance for an NUM strike by building up coal stocks, and there were no cuts in electric power, unlike 1972. Police tactics during the strike concerned civil libertarians: stopping suspected strike sympathisers travelling towards coalfields when they were still long distances from them, phone tapping as evidenced by Labour's Tony Benn, and a violent battle with mass pickets at Orgreave, Yorkshire. But images of massed militant miners using violence to prevent other miners from working, along with the fact that (illegally under a recent Act) the NUM had not held a national ballot to approve strike action. Arthur Scargill's policy of letting each region of the NUM call its own strike backfired when nine areas held ballots that resulted in majority votes against striking, and violence against strikebreakers escalated with time until reaching a tipping point with the killing of David Wilkie (a taxi-driver who was taking a strikebreaker to work). The Miners' Strike lasted a full year, March 1984 until March 1985, before the drift of half the miners back to work forced the NUM leadership to give in without a deal. Thatcher had won a decisive victory and the unions never recovered their political power. This aborted political strike marked a turning point in UK politics: no longer could militant unions remove a democratically elected government. It also marked the beginning of a new economic and political culture in the UK based upon small government intervention in the economy and reduced dominance of the trade unions and welfare state.

==== Thatcher's political and economic philosophy ====
Thatcher's political and economic philosophy emphasised free markets and entrepreneurialism. Since gaining power, she had experimented in selling off a small nationalised company, the National Freight Company, to its workers, with a surprisingly large response. Following the 1983 election, the Government became bolder and sold off many of the large utilities which had been in public ownership since the late 1940s. Many in the public took advantage of share offers, although many sold their shares immediately for a quick profit. The policy of privatisation, while anathema to many on the left, has become synonymous with Thatcherism.

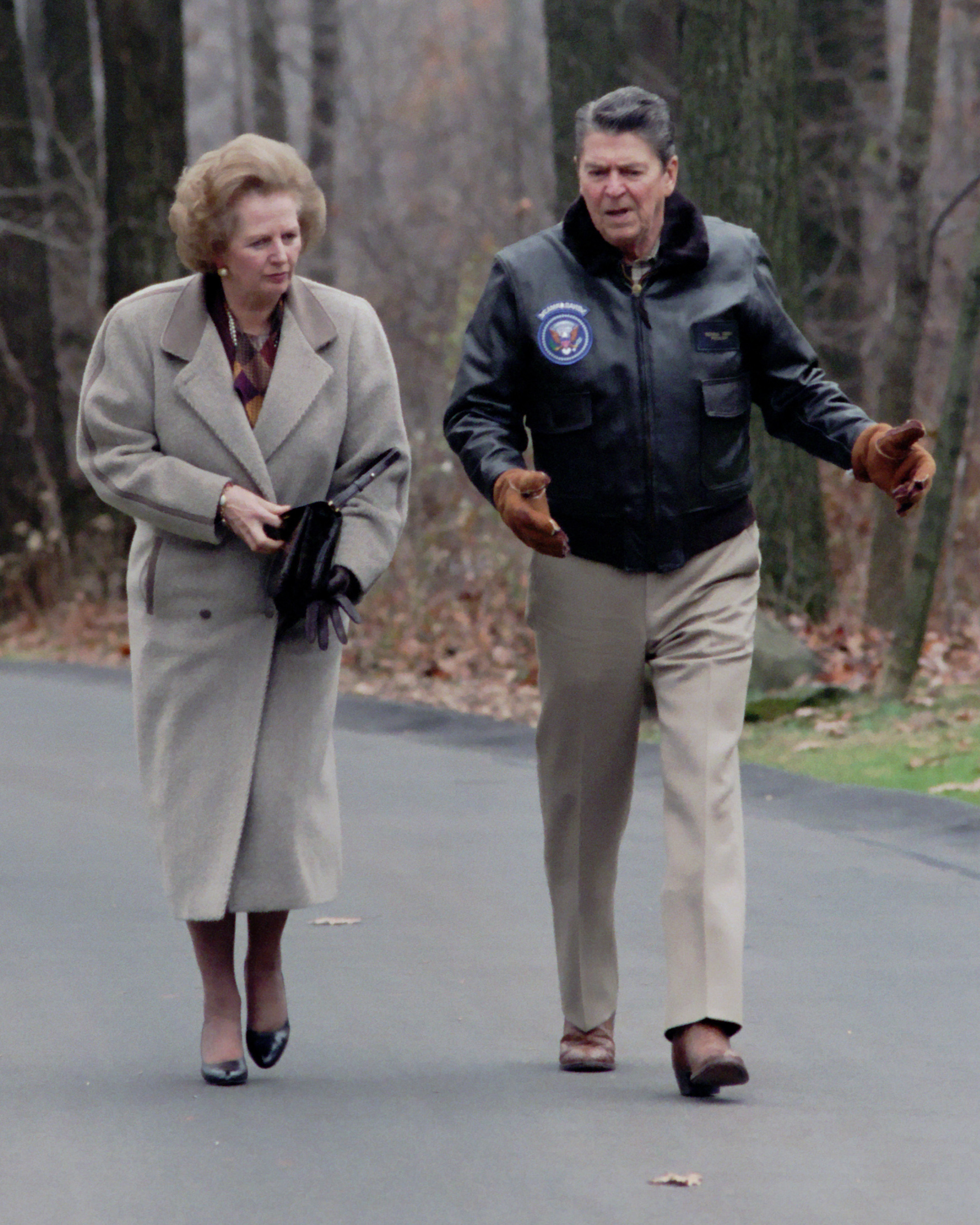
Thatcher with President Ronald Reagan, 1986.

In the Cold War, Thatcher supported Ronald Reagan's policies of Rollback with the goal of reducing or ending Soviet Communist power. This contrasted with the policy of détente which the West had pursued during the 1970s, and caused friction with allies still wedded to the idea of détente. The United States Armed Forces were permitted by Mrs. Thatcher to station nuclear cruise missiles at British Armed Forces bases, arousing mass protests by the Campaign for Nuclear Disarmament. However, she later was the first Western leader to respond warmly to the rise of reformist Soviet leader Mikhail Gorbachev, declaring she liked him and "We can do business together" after a meeting three months before he came to power in 1985. This was a start in swinging the West back to a new détente with the Soviet Union in his era, as it proved to be an indication that the Soviet regime's power was decaying. Thatcher outlasted the Cold War, which ended in 1989, and voices who share her views on it credit her with a part in the West's victory, by both the deterrence and détente postures.

She supported the US bombing raid on Libya from bases in the UK in 1986 when other NATO allies would not. Her liking for defence ties with the United States was demonstrated in the Westland affair when she acted with colleagues to prevent the helicopter manufacturer Westland, a vital defence contractor, from linking with a European Consortium including the Italian firm Agusta in favour of a link with Sikorsky Aircraft Corporation of the United States. Defence Secretary Michael Heseltine, who had pushed the European Consortium, resigned in protest at her style of leadership, and thereafter became a potential leadership challenger. Trade and Industry Secretary Leon Brittan then had to resign for having ordered the leak of a confidential legal letter critical of Heseltine; Thatcher survived the crisis as her personal involvement in the leak was not proven.

By winning the 1987 general election, by another landslide on the economic boom (with unemployment finally falling below 3,000,000 that spring) and against a stubbornly anti-nuclear Labour opposition (now led by Neil Kinnock Following Michael Foot's resignation four years earlier), she became the longest-serving prime minister of the United Kingdom since the 1820s. Most newspapers supported her – with the exception of The Daily Mirror and The Guardian — and were rewarded with regular press briefings by her press secretary, Bernard Ingham.

She was known as "Maggie" in the popular tabloids, which inspired the well-known "Maggie Out!" protest song, sung throughout that period by some of her opponents. Her unpopularity on the left is evident from the lyrics of several contemporary popular songs: "Stand Down Margaret" (The Beat), "Tramp the Dirt Down" (Elvis Costello), "Mother Knows Best" (Richard Thompson), and "Margaret on the Guillotine" (Morrissey).

Many opponents believed she and her policies created a significant north–south divide from the Bristol Channel to The Wash, between the "haves" in the economically dynamic south and the "have nots" in the northern rust belt. Hard welfare reforms in her third term created an adult Employment Training system that included full-time work done for the dole plus a £10 top-up, on the workfare model from the US. The "Social Fund" system that placed one-off welfare payments for emergency needs under a local budgetary limit, and where possible changed them into loans, and rules for assessing jobseeking effort by the week, were breaches of social consensus unprecedented since the 1920s.

The sharp fall in unemployment continued. By the end of 1987, it stood at just over 2,600,000 – having started the year still in excess of 3,000,000. It stood at just over 2,000,000 by the end of 1988, and by the end of 1989 less than 1,700,000 were unemployed. However, total economic growth for 1989 stood at 2% – the lowest since 1982 – signalling an end to the economic boom. Several other countries had now entered recession, and fears were now rife that Britain was also on the verge of another recession.

In 1988, Thatcher, a trained chemist, became concerned with environmental issues, putting on the national agenda such technical issues as Climate change, ozone depletion and acid rain. In 1990, she opened the Hadley Centre for climate prediction and research.

In September 1988, at Bruges, Thatcher announced her opposition to proposals from the European Economic Community for a federal structure and increasing centralisation of decision-making. Although she had supported British membership, Thatcher believed that the role of the EC should be limited to ensuring free trade and effective competition, and feared that new EC regulations would reverse the changes she was making in the UK. "We have not successfully rolled back the frontiers of the state in Britain, only to see them re-imposed at a European level, with a new super-state exercising a new dominance from Brussels". The speech caused an outcry from other European leaders, and exposed for the first time the deep split that was emerging over European policy inside her Conservative Party. Since 1985 Thatcher had been blocking British membership of the European Exchange Rate Mechanism (ERM), a preparation for Economic and Monetary Union, through which a single currency would replace national currencies, which the EC began seriously to discuss by 1990.

Thatcher's popularity once again declined in 1989 as the economy suffered from high interest rates imposed to stop an unsustainable boom. She blamed her chancellor, Nigel Lawson, who had exacerbated the boom by trying to keep the pound sterling low ("shadowing the Deutsche Mark") as a preparation for European Exchange Rate Mechanism membership; Thatcher claimed not to have been told of this and did not approve. At the Madrid European summit, Lawson and Foreign Secretary Geoffrey Howe forced Thatcher to agree the circumstances under which she would join the ERM. Thatcher took revenge on both by demoting Howe, and by listening more to her adviser Sir Alan Walters on economic matters. Lawson resigned that October, feeling that Thatcher had undermined him.

That November, Thatcher was challenged for the leadership of the Conservative Party by Sir Anthony Meyer. As Meyer was a virtually unknown backbench MP, he was viewed as a stalking horse candidate for more prominent members of the party. Thatcher easily defeated Meyer's challenge, but there were 60 ballot papers either cast for Meyer or abstaining, a surprisingly large number for a sitting prime minister.

Thatcher's new system to replace local government rates was introduced in Scotland in 1989 and in England and Wales in 1990. Rates were replaced by the "Community Charge" (more widely known as the poll tax), which applied the same amount to every individual resident, with only limited discounts for low earners. This was to be the most universally unpopular policy of her premiership, and saw the Conservative government split further behind the Labour opposition (still led by Neil Kinnock) in the opinion polls. The Charge was introduced early in Scotland as the rateable values would in any case have been reassessed in 1989. However, it led to accusations that Scotland was a 'testing ground' for the tax. Thatcher apparently believed that the new tax would be popular, and had been persuaded by Scottish Conservatives to bring it in early and in one go. Despite her hopes, the early introduction led to a sharp decline in the already low support for the Conservative party in Scotland.

Additional problems emerged when many of the tax rates set by local councils proved to be much higher than earlier predictions. Some have argued that local councils saw the introduction of the new system of taxation as the opportunity to make significant increases in the amount taken, assuming (correctly) that it would be the originators of the new tax system and not its local operators who would be blamed.

A large London demonstration against the poll tax in Trafalgar Square on 31 March 1990 – the day before it was introduced in England and Wales – turned into a riot. Millions of people resisted paying the tax. Opponents of the tax banded together to resist bailiffs and disrupt court hearings of poll tax debtors. Mrs Thatcher refused to compromise, or change the tax, and its unpopularity was a major factor in Thatcher's downfall.

By the autumn of 1990, opposition to Thatcher's policies on local government taxation, her Government's perceived mishandling of the economy (especially high interest rates of 15%, which were undermining her core voting base within the home-owning, entrepreneurial and business sectors), and the divisions opening within her party over the appropriate handling of European integration made Thatcher and her party seem increasingly politically vulnerable. Her increasingly combative, irritable personality also made opposition to her grow fast and by this point, even many in her own party could not stand her.

=== John Major (1990–1997) ===
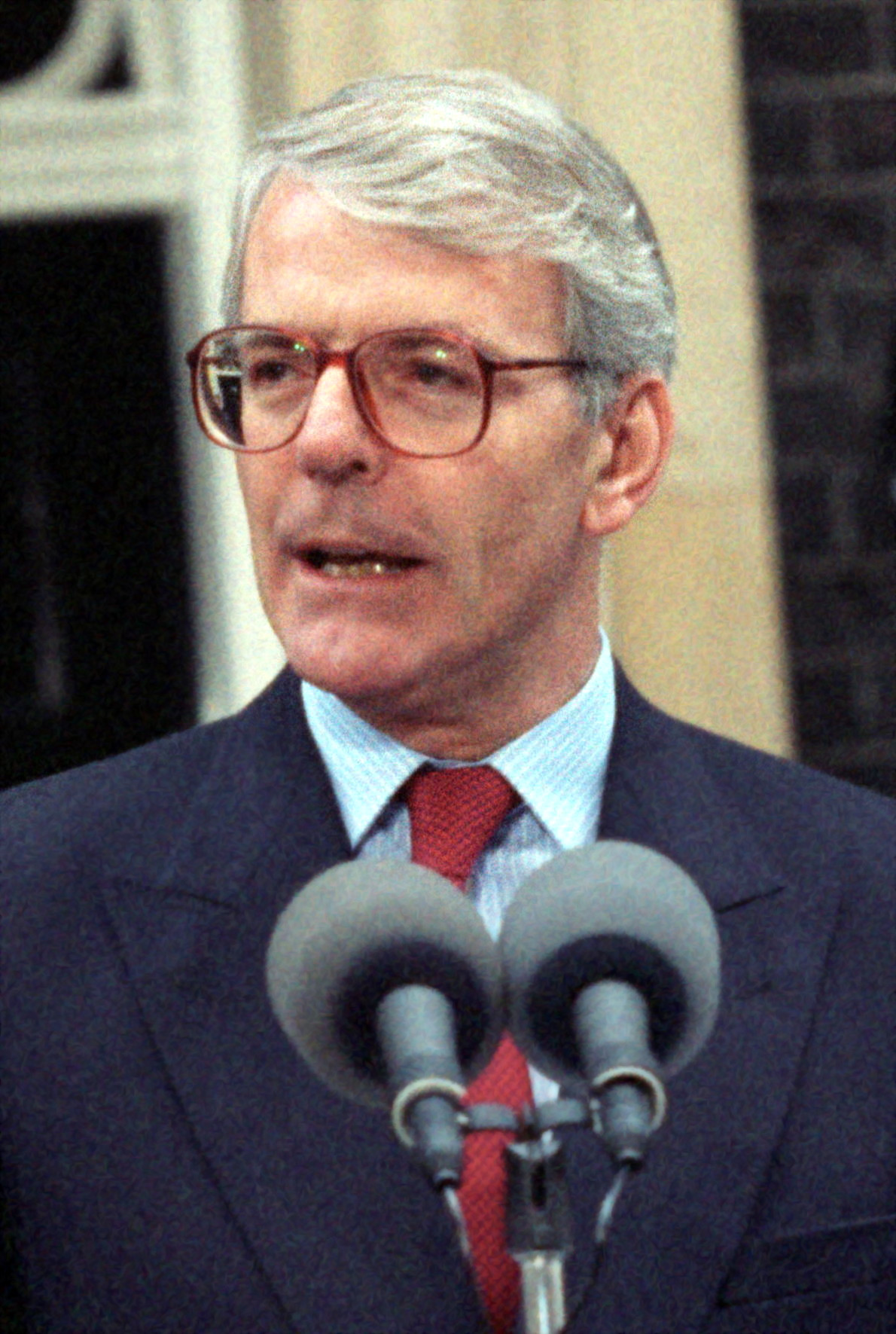
John Major

In November 1990, Michael Heseltine challenged Margaret Thatcher for leadership of the Conservative Party. Thatcher fell short of the required 15% majority in the first round and was persuaded to withdraw from the second round on 22 November, ending her 11-year premiership. Her Chancellor of the Exchequer John Major contested the second round and defeated Michael Heseltine as well as Foreign Secretary Douglas Hurd, becoming prime minister on 28 November 1990.

By this stage, however, Britain had slid into recession for the third time in less than 20 years. Unemployment had started to rise in the spring of 1990 but by the end of the year it was still lower than in many other European economies, particularly France and Italy.

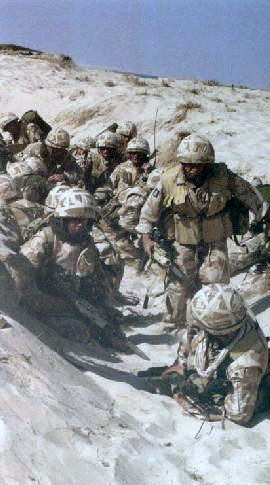
British troops in the Gulf

John Major was prime minister during British involvement in the Gulf War. Polls improved for the Conservatives despite the recession deepening throughout 1991 and into 1992, with the economy for 1991 falling 2% and unemployment passing the 2,000,000 mark. Major called a general election for April 1992 and took his campaign onto the streets, famously delivering many addresses from an upturned soapbox as in his Lambeth days. This populist "common touch", in contrast to the Labour Party's more slick campaign, chimed with the electorate and Major won, albeit with a small parliamentary majority.

The narrow majority for the Conservative government proved to be unmanageable, particularly following the United Kingdom's forced exit from the European Exchange Rate Mechanism on Black Wednesday (16 September 1992) just five months into the new parliament. From this stage onwards, Labour – now led by John Smith – was ascendant in the opinion polls. Major allowed his economic team to stay in place unchanged for seven months after Black Wednesday before forcing the resignation of his chancellor, Norman Lamont, whom he replaced with Kenneth Clarke. This delay was seen as indicative of one of his weaknesses, an indecisiveness towards personnel issues that was to undermine his authority through the rest of his premiership.

At the 1993 Conservative Party Conference, Major began his ill-fated "Back to Basics" campaign, which he intended to be about the economy, education, policing, and other such issues, but it was interpreted by many (including Conservative cabinet ministers) as an attempt to revert to the moral and family values that the Conservative Party were often associated with. A number of sleaze scandals involving Conservative MPs were exposed in lurid and embarrassing detail in tabloid newspapers following this and further reduced the Conservative's popularity. Despite Major's best efforts, the Conservative Party collapsed into political infighting. Major took a moderate approach but found himself undermined by the right-wing within the party and his Cabinet.

Major's policy towards the European Union aroused opposition as the Government attempted to ratify the Maastricht Treaty. Although the Labour opposition supported the treaty, they were prepared to undertake tactical moves to weaken the government, which included passing an amendment that required a vote on the social chapter aspects of the treaty before it could be ratified. Several Conservative MPs (the Maastricht Rebels) voted against the Government and the vote was lost. Major hit back by calling another vote on the following day (23 July 1993), which he declared a vote of confidence. He won by 40 but had damaged his authority.

One of the few bright spots of 1993 for the Conservative government came in April when the end of the recession was finally declared after nearly three years. Unemployment had touched 3,000,000 by the turn of the year, but had dipped to 2,800,000 by Christmas as the economic recovery continued. The economic recovery was strong and sustained throughout 1994, with unemployment falling below 2,500,000 by the end of the year. However, Labour remained ascendant in the opinion polls and their popularity further increased with the election of Tony Blair – who redesignated the party as New Labour – as leader following the sudden death of John Smith on 12 May 1994. Labour remained ascendant in the polls throughout 1995, despite the Conservative government overseeing the continuing economic recovery and fall in unemployment. It was a similar story throughout 1996, despite the economy still being strong and unemployment back below 2,000,000 for the first time since early 1991. The Railways Act 1993 was introduced by John Major's Conservative government and passed on 5 November 1993. It provided for the restructuring of the British Railways Board (BRB), the public corporation that owned and operated the national railway system. A few residual responsibilities of the BRB remained with BRB (Residuary) Ltd.

Few were surprised when Major lost the 1997 general election to Tony Blair, though the immense scale of the landslide defeat was not widely predicted. In the new parliament Labour won 418 seats, the Conservatives 165, and the Liberal Democrats 46, leaving the Labour party with a majority of 179 which was the biggest majority since 1931. In addition, the Conservatives lost all their seats in Scotland and Wales and several cabinet ministers including Michael Portillo, Malcolm Rifkind and Ian Lang lost their seats, as did former cabinet minister Norman Lamont. Major carried on as Leader of the Opposition until William Hague was elected to lead the Conservative Party the month after the election.

== Labour Government, 1997–2010 ==
=== Tony Blair (1997–2007) ===
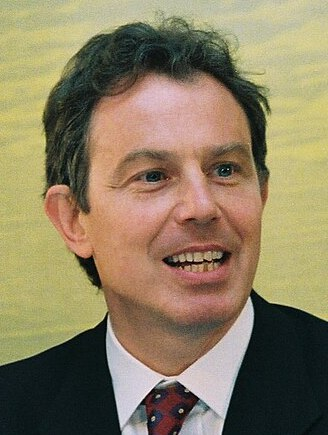
Tony Blair

Tony Blair became prime minister in 1997 after a landslide victory over the Conservative Party. Under the title of New Labour, he promised economic and social reform and brought Labour closer to the centre of the political spectrum. Early policies of the Labour government included the minimum wage and the introduction of university tuition fees. Chancellor of the Exchequer, Gordon Brown also gave the Bank of England the power to set the base rate of interest autonomously. The traditional tendency of governments to manipulate interest rates around the time of general elections for political gain is thought to have been deleterious to the UK economy and helped reinforce a cyclical pattern of boom and bust. Brown's decision was popular with the City, which the Labour Party had been courting since the early 1990s. Blair presided over the longest period of economic expansion in Britain since the 19th century and his premiership saw large investment into social aspects, in particular health and education, areas particularly under-invested during the Conservative government of the 1980s and early 1990s. The Human Rights Act was introduced in 1998 and the Freedom of Information Act came into force in 2000. Most hereditary peers were removed from the House of Lords in 1999 and the Civil Partnership Act 2004 allowed homosexual couples the right to register their partnership with the same rights and responsibilities comparable to heterosexual marriage.

From the beginning, New Labour's record on the economy and unemployment was strong, suggesting that they could break with the trend of Labour governments overseeing an economic decline while in power. They had inherited an unemployment count of 1,700,000 from the Conservatives, and by the following year unemployment was down to 1,300,000 – a level not seen since James Callaghan was in power some 20 years previously. A minimum wage was announced in May 1998, coming into force from April 1999. Unemployment would remain similarly low for the next 10 years.

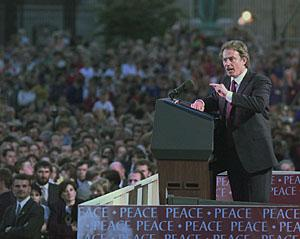
Blair addresses Armagh in 1998

The long-running Northern Ireland peace process was brought to a conclusion in 1998 with the Belfast Agreement which established a devolved Northern Ireland Assembly and de-escalated the violence associated with the Troubles. It was signed in April 1998 by the British and Irish governments and was endorsed by all the main political parties in Northern Ireland with the exception of Ian Paisley's Democratic Unionist Party. Voters in Northern Ireland approved the agreement in a referendum in May 1998 and it came into force in December 1999. In August 1998, a car-bomb exploded in the Northern Ireland town of Omagh, killing 29 people and injuring 220. The attack was carried out by the Real Irish Republican Army who opposed the Belfast Agreement. It was reported in 2005, that the IRA had renounced violence and had ditched its entire arsenal.

In foreign policy, following the 11 September 2001 attacks in the United States, Blair greatly supported U.S. president George W. Bush's new War on terror which began with the forced withdrawal of the Taliban regime in Afghanistan. Blair's case for the subsequent Iraq War was based on their alleged possession of weapons of mass destruction and consequent violation of UN resolutions. He was wary of making direct appeals for regime change, since international law does not recognise this as a ground for war. A memorandum from a July 2002 meeting that was leaked in April 2005 showed that Blair believed that the British public would support regime change in the right political context; the document, however, stated that legal grounds for such action were weak. On 24 September 2002 the Government published a dossier based on the intelligence agencies' assessments of Iraq's weapons of mass destruction. Among the items in the dossier was a recently received intelligence report that "the Iraqi military are able to deploy chemical or biological weapons within 45 minutes of an order to do so". A further briefing paper on Iraq's alleged WMDs was issued to journalists in February 2003. This document was discovered to have taken a large part of its text without attribution from a PhD thesis available on the internet. Where the thesis hypothesised about possible WMDs, the Downing Street version presented the ideas as fact. The document subsequently became known as the "Dodgy Dossier".

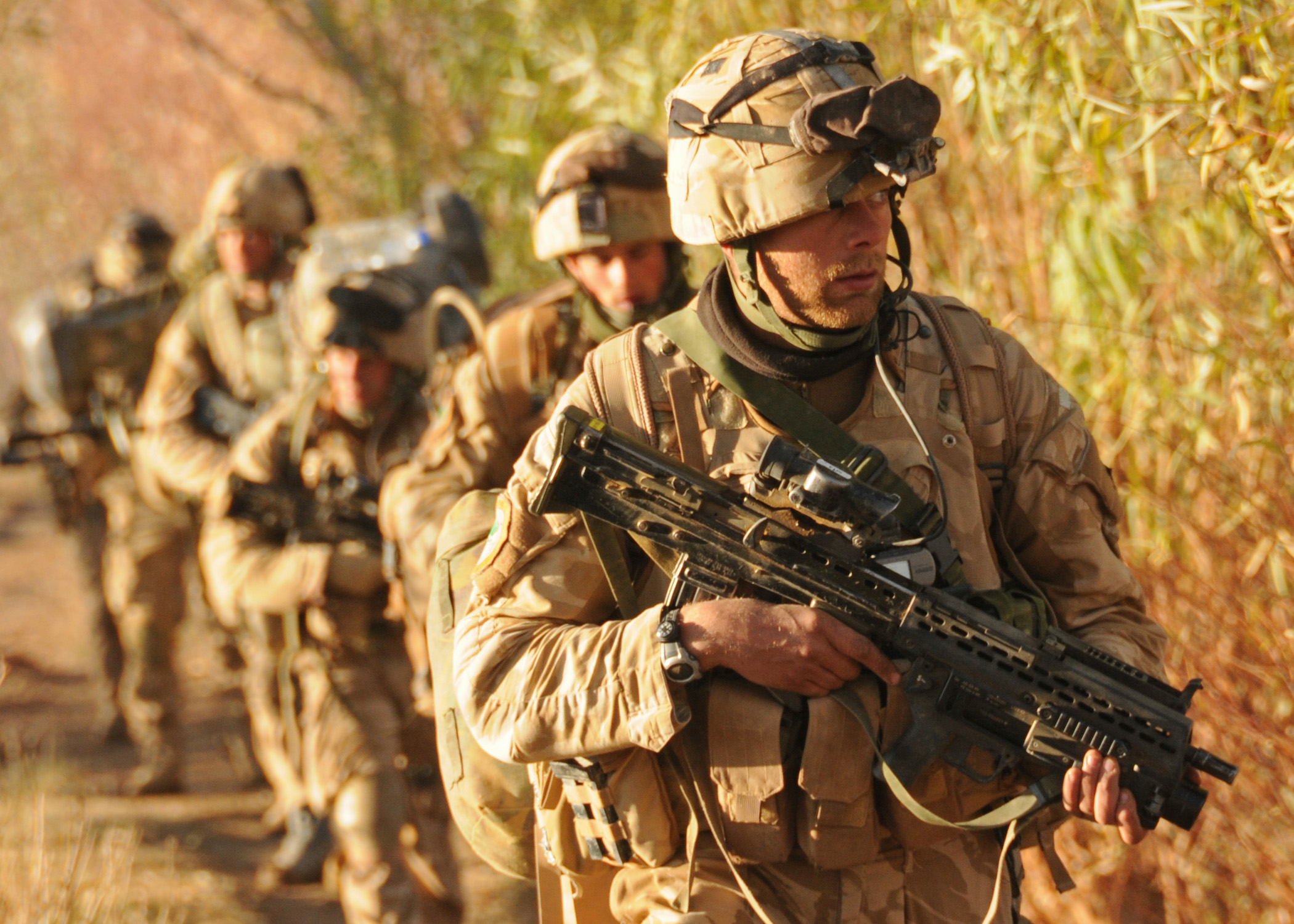
British troops in the Afghan War.

46,000 British troops, one-third of the total strength of the British Army (land forces), were deployed to assist with the invasion of Iraq. When after the war, no WMDs were found in Iraq, the two dossiers, together with Blair's other pre-war statements, became an issue of considerable controversy. Many Labour Party members, including a number who had supported the war, were among the critics. Successive independent inquiries (including those by the Foreign Affairs Select Committee of the House of Commons, the senior judge Lord Hutton, and the former senior civil servant Lord Butler of Brockwell) have found that Blair honestly stated what he believed to be true at the time, though Lord Butler's report did imply that the Government's presentation of the intelligence evidence had been subject to some degree of exaggeration. These findings have not prevented frequent accusations that Blair was deliberately deceitful, and, during the 2005 election campaign, Conservative leader Michael Howard made political capital out of the issue. The new threat of international terrorism ultimately led to the 7 July 2005 bomb attacks in London which killed 52 people as well as the four suicide bombers who led the attack.

The Labour government was re-elected with a second successive landslide in the general election of June 2001. Blair became the first Labour leader to lead the party to three successive election victories when they won the 2005 general election, though this time he had a drastically reduced majority.

The Conservatives had so far failed to represent a serious challenge to Labour's rule, with John Major's successor William Hague unable to make any real improvement upon the disastrous 1997 general election result at the next election four years later. He stepped down after the 2001 election to be succeeded by Iain Duncan Smith, who did not even hold the leadership long enough to contest a general election – being ousted by his own MPs in October 2003 and being replaced by Michael Howard, who had served as Home Secretary in the previous Conservative government under John Major. Howard failed to win the 2005 general election for the Conservatives but he at least had the satisfaction of narrowing the Labour majority, giving his successor (he announced his resignation shortly after the election) a decent platform to build upon. However, the Conservatives began to re-emerge as an electable prospect following the election of David Cameron as Howard's successor in December 2005. Within months of Cameron becoming Conservative leader, opinion polls during 2006 were showing a regular Conservative lead for the first time since Black Wednesday 14 years earlier. Despite the economy still being strong and unemployment remaining low, Labour's decline in support was largely blamed upon poor control of immigration and allowing Britain to become what was seen by many as an easy target for terrorists.

==== Devolution ====
Blair also came into power with a policy of devolution. A pre-legislative referendum was held in Scotland in 1997 with two questions: whether to create a devolved Parliament for Scotland and whether it should have limited tax-varying powers. Following a clear 'yes' vote on both questions in Scotland, a referendum on the proposal for creating a devolved Assembly for Wales was held one week later. This produced a narrow 'yes' vote. Both measures were put into effect and the Scottish Parliament and Welsh Assembly began operating in 1999. The first general election to the Scottish parliament saw the creation of a Labour-Liberal Democrat coalition with Donald Dewar as First Minister. Following the first election to the Welsh Assembly, the Labour Party formed a minority government with Alun Michael as the Welsh First Minister. In the 2007 Scottish general election, the Scottish National Party gained enough seats to form a minority government with its leader Alex Salmond as First Minister.

Devolution also returned to Northern Ireland, leaving England as the only constituent country of the United Kingdom without a devolved administration. Within England, a devolved authority for London was re-established following a 'yes' vote in a London-wide referendum.

=== Gordon Brown (2007–2010) ===
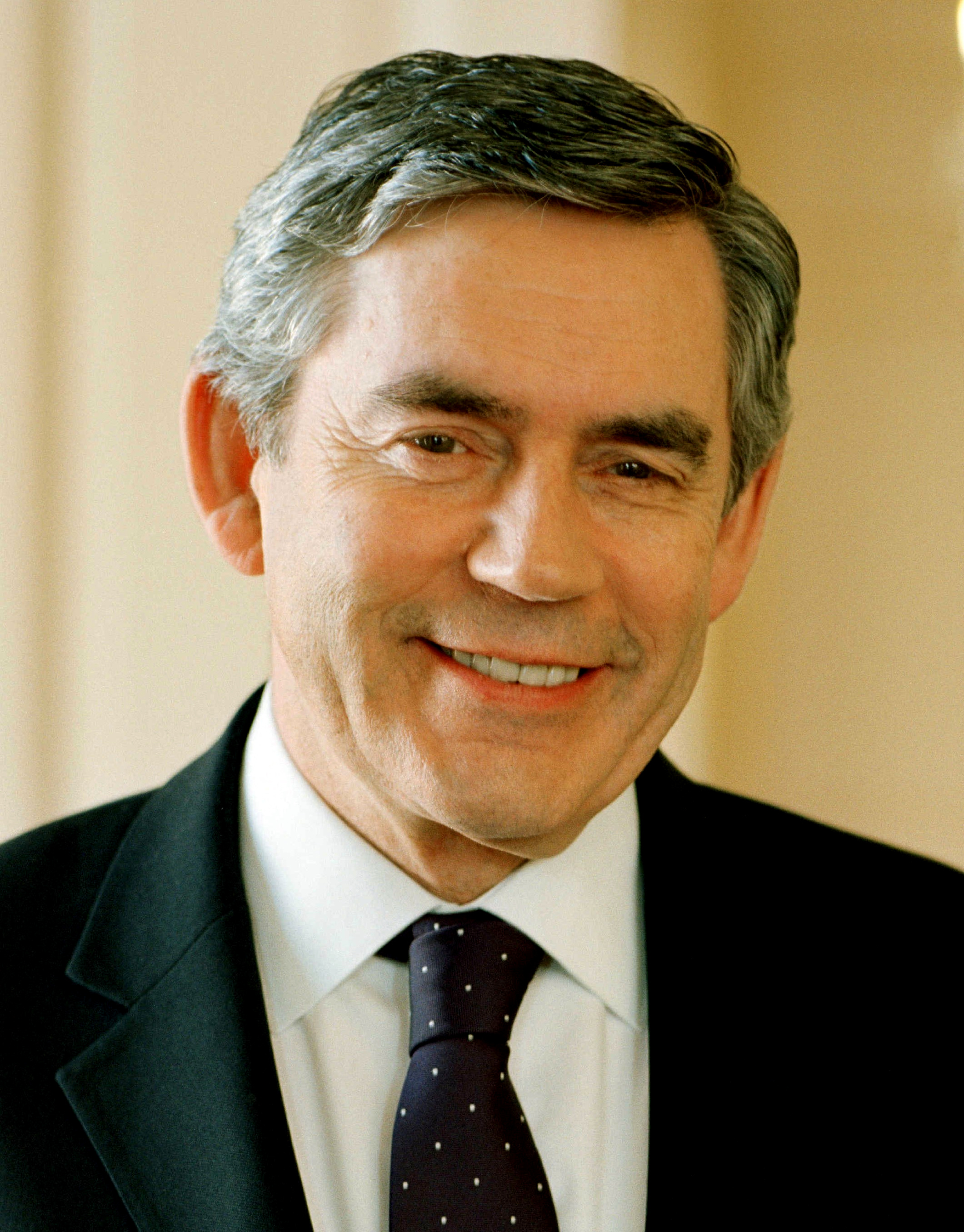
Gordon Brown

Tony Blair tendered his resignation as Prime Minister of the United Kingdom to the Queen on 27 June 2007, his successor Gordon Brown assuming office the same afternoon. Brown took over as prime minister without having to face either a general election or a contested election for leadership of the Labour Party.

Brown's style of government differed from that of his predecessor, Tony Blair, who had been seen as presidential. Brown rescinded some of the policies which had either been introduced or were planned by Blair's administration. He remained committed to close ties with the United States and to the Iraq war, although he established an inquiry into the reasons why Britain had participated in the conflict. He proposed a "government of all the talents" which would involve co-opting leading personalities from industry and other professional walks of life into government positions. Brown also appointed Jacqui Smith as the UK's first female Home Secretary, while Brown's old position as chancellor was taken over by Alistair Darling.

Brown was closer to American thinking, and more distant from Europe, than Blair. In major issues with foreign policy complications, He paid close attention to both the United States and the European Union, especially regarding the deregulation of the Bank of England, the Welfare to Work program, and his response to the 2008 financial crisis at the G20 summit in London in 2009. Brown decided in 1997 to follow the American model and grant operational independence to set interest rates to the Bank of England, rather than have the power remain with the Treasury. He explained the Bank's monetary policy objective "will be to deliver price stability and...to support the Government's economic policy." Brown argued for a neoliberal policy on welfare in 1997. His goal was to move people off welfare and into actual employment. He stated:

But we cannot build a dynamic economy unless we can unleash the potential in everyone. A welfare state that thwarts the opportunities that we need will hold the economy back. A welfare state that encourages work is not only fair but makes for greater dynamism in the economy.

Brown's reaction to the great 2008 banking crisis was much more proactive than France or Germany, and in many ways resembled the Bush policies in Washington. Brown's goals were to provide more liquidity to the financial system, to recapitalise the banks and to guarantee bank debt. He lowered the VAT to encourage consumer spending and to keep the economy from sinking.

Brown's rise to prime minister sparked a brief surge in Labour support as the party topped most opinion polls. There was talk of a "snap" general election, which it was widely believed Labour could win, but Brown decided against calling an election.

The Brown ministry introduced several fiscal policies to help keep the British economy afloat during the 2008 financial crisis, although it led to a dramatic increase in national debt. Unemployment soared through 2008 due to the Great Recession, and Labour standings in the opinion polls plummeted as the Conservatives became ascendant.

Several major banks were nationalised after falling into financial difficulties, while large amounts of money were pumped into the economy to encourage spending. Brown was also press ganged into giving Gurkhas settlement rights in Britain by the actress and campaigner Joanna Lumley and attracted criticism for its handling of the release of Abdelbaset al-Megrahi, the only person to have been convicted over the 1988 Lockerbie bombing.

Further European integration was introduced under the Labour governments after 1997, including the Treaty of Amsterdam (1997) and the Treaty of Nice (2001). The Treaty of Lisbon (2007) introduced many further changes. Prominent changes included more qualified majority voting in the Council of Ministers, increased involvement of the European Parliament in the legislative process through extended codecision with the Council of Ministers, eliminating the pillar system established by the Maastricht Treaty of the early 1990s and the creation of a President of the European Council with a term of two and a half years and a High Representative of the Union for Foreign Affairs and Security Policy to present a united position on EU policies. The Treaty of Lisbon made the Union's human rights charter, the Charter of Fundamental Rights, legally binding. The Lisbon Treaty led to an increase in the voting weight of the UK in the Council of the European Union from 8.4% to 12.4%. In July 2008 the Labour government under Gordon Brown approved the treaty.

Initially, during the first four months of his premiership, Brown enjoyed a solid lead in the polls. His popularity amongst the public may be due to his handling of numerous serious events during his first few weeks as prime minister, including two attempted terrorist attacks in London and Glasgow at the end of June. However, between the end of 2007 and September 2008, his popularity had fallen significantly, with two contributing factors believed to be his perceived change of mind over plans to call a snap general election in October 2007, and his handling of the 10p tax rate cut in 2008, which led to allegations of weakness and dithering. His unpopularity led eight labour MPs to call for a leadership contest in September 2008, less than 15 months into his premiership. The threat of a leadership contest receded due to his perceived strong handling of the 2008 financial crisis in October, but his popularity hit an all-time low, and his position became increasingly under threat following the May 2009 expenses scandal and Labour's poor results in the 2009 Local and European elections. Brown's cabinet began to rebel with several key resignations in the run up to local elections in June 2009.

In January 2010, it was revealed that Britain's economy had resumed growth after a recession which had seen a record six successive quarters of economic detraction. However, it was a narrow return to growth, and it came after the other major economies had come out of recession.

The 2010 general election resulted in a hung parliament – Britain's first for 36 years – with the Conservative Party controlling 306 Seats, the Labour Party 258 Seats and the Liberal Democrats 57 Seats. Brown remained as caretaker prime minister while the Liberal Democrats negotiated with Labour and the Conservatives to form a coalition government. He announced his intention to resign on 10 May 2010 to help broker a Labour-Liberal Democrat deal. However, this became increasingly unlikely, and on 11 May Brown announced his resignation as prime minister and as Leader of the Labour Party. This paved the way for the Conservatives to return to power after 13 years.

His deputy Harriet Harman became Leader of the Opposition until September 2010, when Ed Miliband was elected Leader of the Labour Party.

== Conservative–Liberal Democrat Coalition Government, 2010–2015 ==
David Cameron (Conservative Party) was Prime Minister (senior coalition partner)

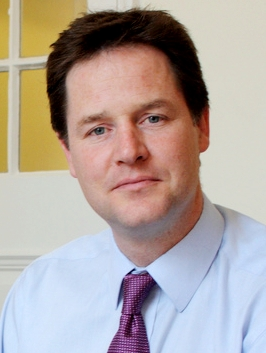
Nick Clegg (Liberal Democrats) was Deputy Prime Minister (junior coalition partner)

The Conservative Party won the 2010 general election but did not win enough seats to win an outright majority. David Cameron, who had led the party since 2005 became prime minister on 11 May 2010 after the Conservatives formed a coalition government with the Liberal Democrats. Nick Clegg, Leader of the Liberal Democrats was appointed Deputy Prime Minister and several other Liberal Democrats were given cabinet positions. Cameron promised to reduce Britain's spiralling budget deficit by cutting back on public service spending and by transferring more power to local authorities. He committed his government to Britain's continuing role in the War in Afghanistan and stated that he hopes to remove British troops from the region by 2015. An emergency budget was prepared in June 2010 by Chancellor of the Exchequer George Osborne which stated that VAT will be raised to 20% and there will be a large reduction in public spending. A key Liberal Democrat policy is that of voting reform, to which a referendum took place in May 2011 on whether or not Britain should adopt a system of Alternative Vote to elect MPs to Westminster. However, the proposal was rejected overwhelmingly, with 68% of voters in favour of retaining first-past-the-post. The Liberal Democrat turnabout on tuition policy at the universities alienated their younger supporters, and the continuing weakness of the economy, despite spending cutbacks, alienated the elders.

In March 2011, UK, along with France and USA voted for military intervention against Gaddafi's Libya leading to 2011 military intervention in Libya. On 6 August, the death of Mark Duggan sparked the 2011 England riots.

In 2012, the Summer Olympics returned to London for the first time since 1948. The United States claimed the largest count of gold medals, with Britain running third place after China.

In 2014, Scotland voted in a referendum on the question of becoming an independent country. The No side, supported by the three major UK parties, secured a 55% to 45% majority for Scotland to remain part of the United Kingdom. Following the result on 18 September 2014, Scotland's First Minister, Alex Salmond, announced his intention to step down as First Minister and leader of the SNP. He was replaced by his deputy, Nicola Sturgeon.

== Conservative Government, 2015–2024 ==
=== David Cameron (2015–2016) ===
Following years of austerity, the British economy was on an upswing in 2015. In line with the Fixed-term Parliaments Act 2011, the 2015 general election was called for 7 May 2015. The Conservatives claimed credit for the upswing, promising to keep taxes low and reduce the deficit as well as promising an In/out referendum on the UK's relationship with the European Union. The opposition Labour Party called for a higher minimum wage, and higher taxes on the rich. In Scotland, the SNP attacked the austerity programme, opposed nuclear weapons and demanded that promises of more autonomy for Scotland made during the independence referendum be delivered.

Pre-election polls had predicted a close race and a hung parliament, but the surprising result was that a majority Conservative government was elected. The Conservatives with 37% of the popular vote held a narrow majority with 331 of the 650 seats. The other main victor was the Scottish National Party which won 56 of the 59 seats in Scotland, a gain of 50. Labour suffered its worst defeat since 1987, taking only 31% of the votes and 232 seats; they lost 40 of their 41 seats in Scotland. The Liberal Democrats vote fell by 2/3 and they lost 49 of their 57 seats, as their coalition with the Conservatives had alienated the great majority of their supporters. The new UK Independence Party (UKIP), rallying voters against Europe and against immigration, did well with 13% of the vote count. It came in second in over 115 constituencies but came in first in only one. Women now comprise 29% of the MPs. Following the election, the Leaders of the Labour Party and Liberal Democrats both resigned. They were replaced by Jeremy Corbyn and Tim Farron, respectively.

==== 2016 European Union membership referendum ====
Results of the 2016 referendum Remain Leave

On 23 June 2016, UK voters elected to withdraw from the European Union by a thin margin with 48% in favour of remaining, 52% in favour of leaving the European Union. London, Scotland, and Northern Ireland were three regions most in favour of the Remain vote, while Wales and England's northern region were strongly pro-Leave. Although he called for the referendum, British prime minister David Cameron had campaigned ardently for the Remain vote. He faced significant opposition from other parties on the right who came to view British membership in the European Union as a detriment to the country's security and economic vitality. UK Independence Party leader Nigel Farage called the vote Britain's "independence day".

Brexit had a few immediate consequences. Hours after the results of the referendum, David Cameron announced that he would resign as prime minister, claiming that "fresh leadership" was needed. In addition, because Scottish voters were highly in favour of remaining in the EU, Scottish First Minister Nicola Sturgeon announced that the Scottish Government would begin to organize another referendum on the question of Scottish independence. On the economic side of things, the value of the British pound declined sharply after the results of the election were made clear. Stock markets in both Britain and New York were down the day after the referendum. Oil prices also fell.

=== Theresa May (2016–2019) ===
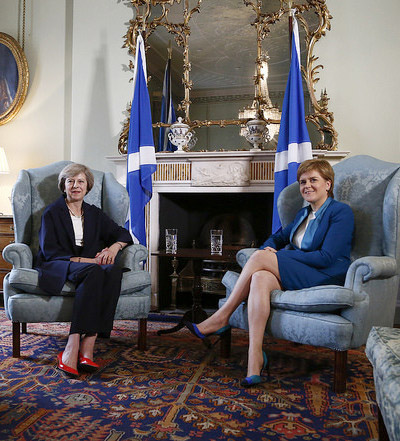
Theresa May (left) meeting with First Minister of Scotland, Nicola Sturgeon (right)

A Conservative Party leadership election occurred following Cameron's announcement of his resignation. All candidates except Theresa May had either been eliminated or withdrawn from the race by 11 July 2016; as a result, May automatically became the new Leader of the Conservative Party and became prime minister after Cameron's official resignation on 13 July 2016. On 18 April 2017, the Prime Minister Theresa May called for an election on 8 June 2017, despite previously ruling out an early election on a multitude of occasions. The outcome of the election resulted in the second hung parliament of the 21st century: with the Conservatives being the largest party with 317 seats (which was 9 seats short of a majority). This resulted in the formation of a Conservative minority government which was supported by the Northern Irish Democratic Unionist Party. Following repeated rejections of her proposed Brexit withdrawal agreement, May announced her intention to resign on 24 May 2019.

=== Boris Johnson (2019–2022) ===
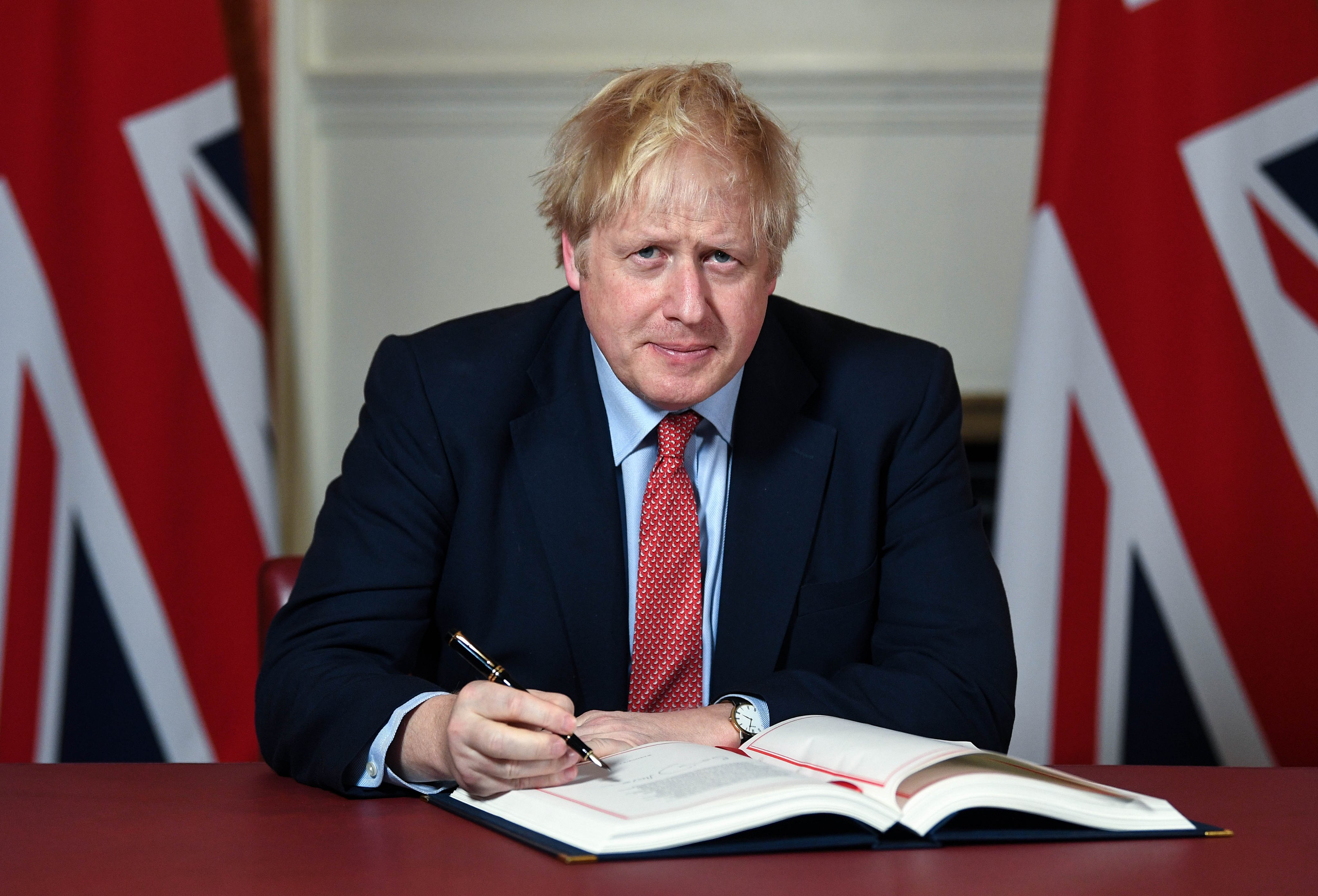
Johnson signing the Brexit Withdrawal Agreement, 24 January 2020

The premiership of Boris Johnson began on 24 July 2019 when Johnson accepted Queen Elizabeth II's invitation, at her prerogative, to form an administration.

On 3 September 2019, Johnson threatened to call a general election after opposition and rebel Conservative MPs successfully voted against the government to take control of the order of business with a view to preventing a no-deal exit. The Benn Act, a bill to block a no-deal exit, passed the Commons on 4 September 2019, causing Johnson to call for a general election set for 12 December 2019. After several votes, a new election was approved for December 2019, in which the Conservative Party won an 80-seat majority, partially assisted by the Brexit Party, formed earlier in the year, agreeing to only campaign in non-Conservative seats. On 31 January 2020, Johnson took the country out of the European Union with the new Brexit deal he negotiated. He also oversaw the impact of Brexit on the Irish border, with his ministry negotiating the terms of the Northern Ireland Protocol.

Johnson then oversaw the government's response to the COVID-19 pandemic in which the government imposed national lockdowns, health programs, and vaccination rollouts. The economic effects of the pandemic, Brexit, and other factors led to a cost-of-living crisis beginning in 2021 which saw the prices of many goods and services to skyrocket in the United Kingdom. The Russian invasion of Ukraine in February 2022 led Johnson to support Ukraine financially and militarily, with Johnson traveling to Kyiv to visit with Ukrainian President Volodymyr Zelenskyy. Various scandals rocked the Johnson ministry throughout 2022 including Johnson personally being served a fine for Partygate, in which 10 Downing Street was revealed to host social gatherings during the nationwide lockdown orders during the pandemic. The embroilment of Chris Pincher in a sex scandal led to mass resignations in Johnson's cabinet, leading Johnson to announce his resignation as leader of the Conservative Party on 7 July 2022 and Prime Minister on 6 September 2022. He was succeeded by Liz Truss.

=== Liz Truss (September–October 2022) ===
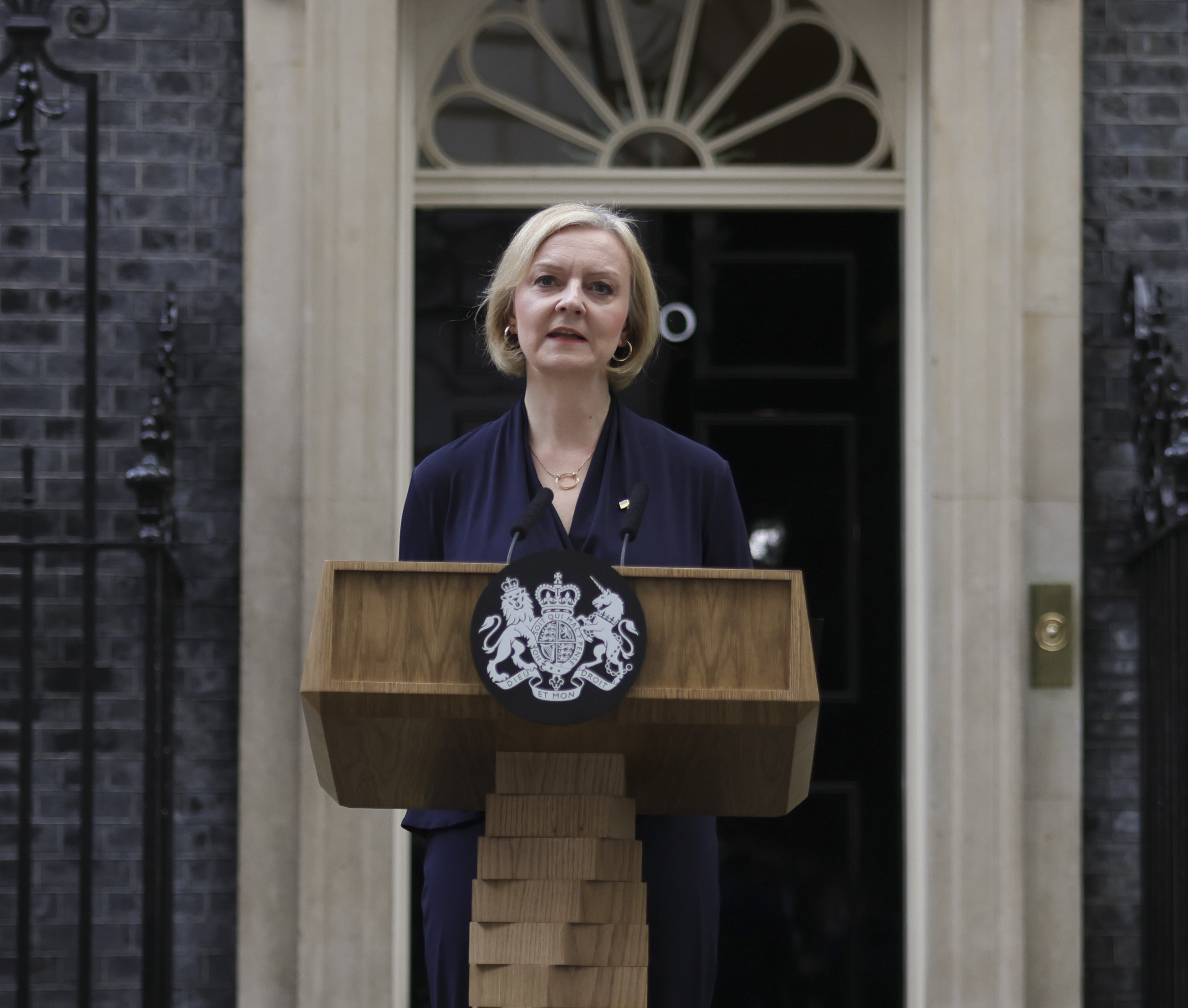
Truss announcing her resignation as Conservative leader

The premiership of Liz Truss began on 6 September 2022 following a leadership election. Queen Elizabeth II's invitation for Truss to form a government was one of her last acts as monarch before her death just two days later. This saw Charles III ascend to the throne and the funeral of the late monarch dominating Truss's first weeks in office.

With the appointment of Kwasi Kwarteng as Chancellor of the Exchequer, James Cleverly as Foreign Secretary, and Suella Braverman as Home Secretary, for the first time in British political history, no white men held positions in the Great Offices of State.

Truss and Chancellor Kwasi Kwarteng unveiled a "mini-budget" on 23 September 2022 which proposed cutting various taxes against the backdrop of the ongoing cost-of-living crisis. The budget received significant backlash, with the price of the pound as well as Truss's approval rating to fall to record lows. Kwarteng resigned, with Jeremy Hunt taking over as chancellor, who reversed all proposals of the mini-budget within days; however this did not alleviate the political pressure on Truss. She announced her resignation on 20 October 2022, making her the shortest-serving prime minister to date. A leadership election was called to replace Truss within a week of her announcement. A head of lettuce gained international notoriety for outlasting Truss during a livestream by the Daily Star.

=== Rishi Sunak (2022–2024) ===
The premiership of Rishi Sunak began on 25 October 2022 following a leadership election. Sunak was the first prime minister invited to form a government during the reign of King Charles III, as well as the first British Asian, first British Indian, first person of colour, and first Hindu prime minister. He was also Britain’s wealthiest ever prime minister as a former hedge fund manager.

Sunak attended and spoke at the coronation of Charles III and Queen Camilla on 6 May 2023. Sunak reshuffled his cabinet twice, the latter of which resulted in the return of the former prime minister David Cameron to government as Foreign Secretary. Under Sunak, the Conservative Party continued to be generally unpopular according to polls and results of local elections. Labour, the Liberal Democrats and the Greens made huge gains at the expense of the Conservatives in the 2023 and 2024 local elections. Sunak called a general election for 4 July 2024.

Sunak continued to oversee the British government's response to the cost-of-living crisis and a rise in labour disputes. He and Chancellor of the Exchequer Jeremy Hunt continued the levelling up policy introduced during the Johnson premiership. In response to the continued rise of migrants arriving by small boats, Sunak proposed the Illegal Migration Act 2023. Sunak supports Johnson's policy of lowering net migration, continuing the plan to have asylum seekers and illegal immigrants sent to Rwanda for processing. After the plan was blocked by the UK's Court of Appeal in June 2023 due to concerns over international law and the possibility of refoulement, the government introduced the Safety of Rwanda (Asylum and Immigration) Bill. Sunak authorized further foreign aid and weapons shipments to Ukraine in response to the Russian invasion of the country. In February 2023, Sunak negotiated the Windsor Framework, an agreement with the European Union (EU) designed to address the issue of the movement of goods between the European single market and Northern Ireland in the current Northern Ireland Protocol. The 2024 general election was held on 4 July 2024.

== Labour Government, 2024–present ==
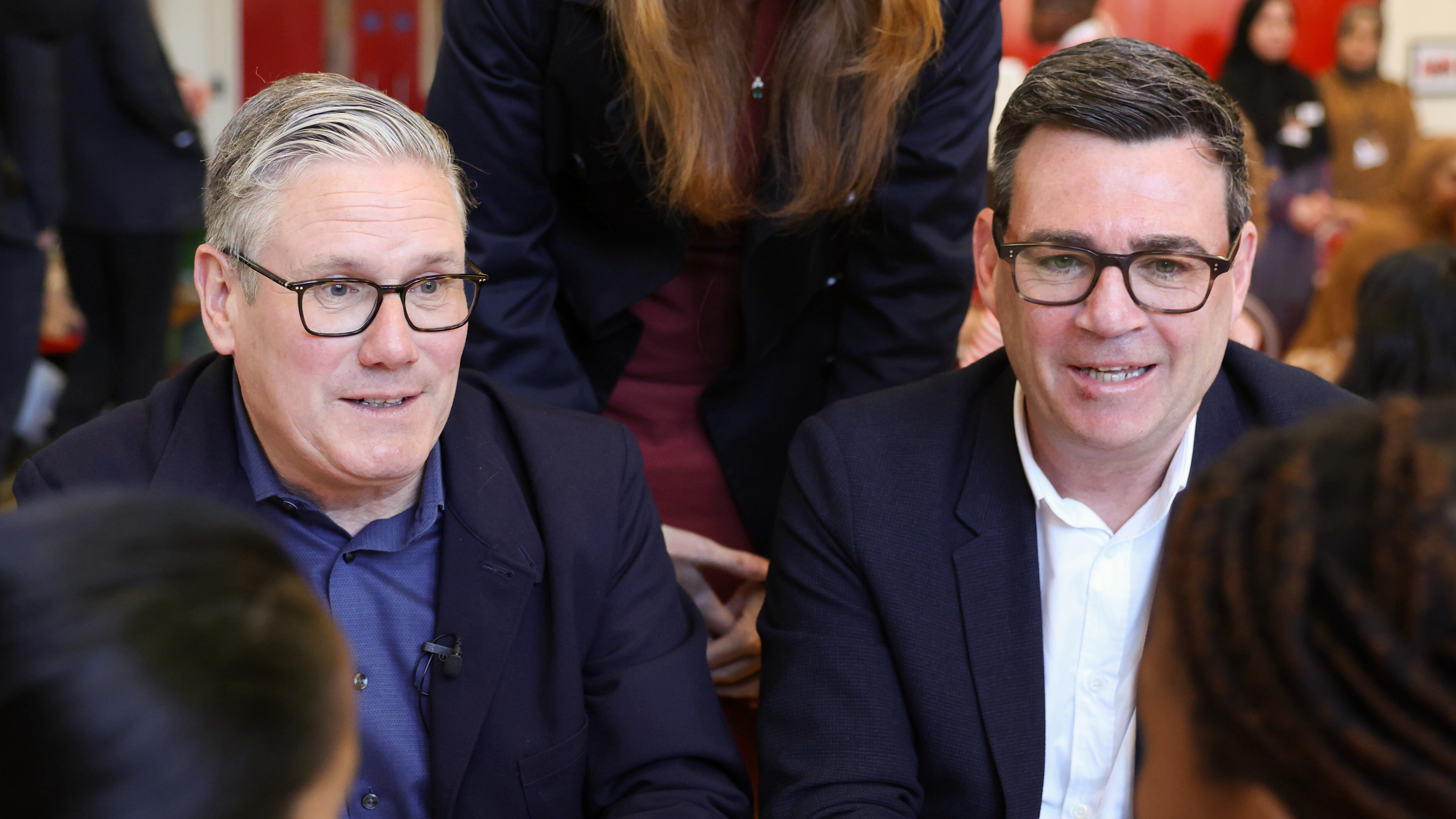
Prime Ministers Keir Starmer (left) and Andy Burnham (right)

=== Keir Starmer (2024–2026) ===
On 4 July 2024, the Labour Party won a landslide victory in the 2024 General Election (albeit with a low turnout) bringing 14 years of Conservative rule to an end. Labour Party leader Keir Starmer became Britain’s new prime minister.

Under Starmer's premiership, the government ended certain Winter Fuel Payments for around 10 million people, implemented an early-release scheme for thousands of prisoners to reduce prison overcrowding, settled a number of public-sector strikes and announced the establishment of Great British Energy. He also announced the nationalization of Great British Steel. Chancellor Rachel Reeves introduced the largest tax rises at a budget since March 1993 in her October 2024 budget. Starmer announced the Border Security Command to replace the defunct Rwanda asylum plan and the National Violent Disorder Programme in response to the 2024 riots, as well as reforms to workers' rights. Starmer's government was seen as tacking to the right on immigration policy, and warned that the country risked becoming an "island of strangers." In foreign policy, Starmer supported Ukraine against the Russian invasion and initially supported Israel in the Gaza war, but later called for a ceasefire in the Gaza Strip and condemned Israel's actions. In September 2025, his government formally recognised the State of Palestine. Starmer responded to the 2026 Iran war by shooting down Iranian drones and missiles over allied countries in the Middle East, but denied a request from US president Donald Trump to use British military bases and criticised opposition leaders Nigel Farage and Kemi Badenoch for their immediate support for the war.

Starmer was viewed unfavourably by the British public during his premiership, due to a prolonged cost-of-living crisis and controversies surrounding the government ending certain Winter Fuel Payments, the freebies controversy involving donations to Starmer, raising employers' national insurance, the changes to farmers' inheritance tax, and the Peter Mandelson appointment scandal. Starmer's approval ratings fell to historical lows for a British prime minister, drawing comparisons to Liz Truss. Starmer's unpopularity was tied to poor results for Labour in the 2025 United Kingdom local elections. The party had further poor performances in the 2026 United Kingdom local elections, the 2026 Scottish Parliament election and the 2026 Senedd election, which led to a leadership crisis beginning in May 2026. On 22 June 2026, days after Andy Burnham's return to parliament, Starmer announced his resignation as Prime Minister and as leader of the Labour Party, and a leadership election was subsequently held.

=== Andy Burnham (2026–present) ===
The premiership of Andy Burnham began on 20 July 2026 following an uncontested leadership election.

== See also ==
- History of the United Kingdom
- 2010s in the United Kingdom
- 2020s in the United Kingdom
