= 1993 United Kingdom budget =

1993 United Kingdom budget may refer to:

- March 1993 United Kingdom budget, held on 16 March
- November 1993 United Kingdom budget, held on 30 November
