= November 1993 United Kingdom budget =

1993 United Kingdom budget
- Presented: 30 November 1993
- Parliament: 51st
- Party: Conservative Party
- Chancellor: Kenneth Clarke

The November 1993 United Kingdom budget (officially titled The budget of a responsible government) was delivered by Kenneth Clarke, the Chancellor of the Exchequer, to the House of Commons on 30 November 1993. It was the second budget to be presented in 1993, and the first to be presented by Clarke following his appointment as Chancellor by Prime Minister John Major earlier that year. The November 1993 budget was also the first in the modern era to be held in the autumn, the government having decided to move the date of the budget so it could outline its tax and spending plans at the same time.

Many of the measures outlined in Clarke's first budget followed through from decisions made by his predecessor, Norman Lamont, in the budget of March 1993. He announced plans to eliminate the public spending deficit by the end of the decade, and planned to raise £10.5bn over three years with a programme of tax increases and spending cuts. With VAT on domestic fuel to be raised from April 1994, he outlined details of some Social Security benefits designed to offset the impact of the increase in costs for heating and lighting. Plans to replace Unemployment Benefit with Jobseeker's Allowance were also announced, along with changes in eligibility for maternity benefit, as well as the transferring of payment of Statutory sick pay from the state to some larger employers. Plans were also announced to equalise the State Pension age to 65 beginning in 2010. The budget was welcomed by business in the City of London, but Labour Party leader John Smith, the leader of the Opposition, dismissed it as a "vicious attack on the welfare state".

== Background ==
Having served as Home Secretary, Kenneth Clarke was appointed to the role of Chancellor of the Exchequer in May 1993, replacing Norman Lamont, who had delivered the previous budget in March. The government also decided to move the date of the budget from the spring to the autumn, as it would enable both its spending and taxation programmes to be outlined at the same time. This was the first time in the modern era that a budget would be presented in the autumn. In June 1993, tough spending measures had been agreed by the Cabinet following a public spending review. In the lead up to the statement there was media speculation that VAT would be added to the cost of purchasing books and newspapers, but in the week before Clarke was due to deliver his first budget, Prime Minister John Major had dinner with news publisher Rupert Murdoch, something that later raised eyebrows when the measure was not included. Also in the week before the budget, Clarke had reduced the UK's interest rate to 5%, its lowest since 1977. At the same time, the Bank of England was given responsibility for the precise timing of interest rate changes.

== Overview ==
In his first budget, officially titled The budget of a responsible government, Clarke described the objectives as being to sustain the economic growth that the UK economy was now experiencing following the recession and to create the right economic climate for jobs. Many of the measures outlined in November 1993 were following through with decisions that had been made in the previous budget, with the chancellor unveiling a programme of tax increases and spending cuts designed to raise £10.5bn (Note: about £23bn at 2021 prices) over three years. The chancellor said that much had been done in the previous budget to reduce the public sector borrowing requirement (PSBR), but more measures were required to further reduce the public deficit. His statement would outline measures that would save a further £5bn (Note: about £11bn at 2021 prices) in 1994–95, £7bn (Note: about £15bn at 2021 prices) in 1995–96 and £10bn (Note: about £22bn at 2021 prices) in 1996–97, equivalent to 1% of GDP by the end of the parliament. Moreover, they would help to reduce the PSBR from £50bn (Note: about £108bn at 2021 prices) in 1993–94 to around £38bn (Note: about £82bn at 2021 prices) in 1994–95, and "It should eliminate borrowing to finance current spending by 1997–98 and eliminate Government borrowing entirely by the end of the decade."

The UK's economic recovery was described as having begun in the first half of 1992, before the UK's departure from the Exchange Rate Mechanism, and by November 1993, GDP had risen for six consecutive quarters. Underlying Inflation was at its lowest since 1968, and expected to remain within the government's target of between 1% and 4% for the rest of the parliament. Clarke told the House that "low inflation must now remain a permanent feature of the British economic landscape". Economic growth was forecast to be at 1% for 1993 and 2% for 1994. Unemployment had fallen quicker than after previous recessions, with the UK the only country within the European Union where unemployment had fallen. Exports outside the European Union had increased by 14%.

The outcome of the spending reviews carried out earlier in the year meant that over the next three years, Government expenditure was forecast to grow by less than the projected growth of the economy, and would fall as a proportion of national income, from 45% in 1993–94 to 42% in 1996–97. One of the ways this was to be achieved was by freezing the costs of central government. Local authority spending would also be capped at 2.3% for 1994–95. Three new private finance initiative-funded projects were given the go-ahead – the extension of the Docklands Light Railway to Lewisham, a new Air Traffic Control centre for Scotland, and an upgrade of the West Coast Main Line. A total of 40 private finance initiatives were now underway in the National Health Service, while private finance would also be used in the construction of six new prisons. The government was also considering how to bring private finance into road building.

The levels of income tax were unchanged, but personal allowances (apart from the Blind Person's Tax Allowance) were frozen for two years in succession. With VAT on domestic fuel scheduled to be raised from April 1994, the chancellor outlined details of some Social Security benefits intended to offset the impact of the increase would have on gas and electricity bills, including bringing benefit increases forward by a year. Benefits overall would increase by 3.5%, while pensions would have their first above-inflation increase since the late 1970s. Plans to replace Unemployment Benefit with Jobseeker's Allowance were also announced, along with changes in the eligibility for maternity benefit, and responsibility for the payment of Statutory Sick Pay was to be transferred in some cases from the state to some larger employers.

The chancellor said that he had no intention of asking Parliament to change VAT on domestic fuel plans, and forecast that it would raise £3bn (Note: about £7bn at 2021 prices) in 1994, and enable UK carbon emissions to be reduced to their 1990 levels by the end of the decade. The chancellor also announced that the UK's state pension age would be equalised at 65 from 2010, with the changes being phased in over the decade from 2010 to 2020: "All developed countries are making similar changes for similar reasons. Women nowadays tend to spend more of their lives in paid employment. They also live longer than men. Pension schemes need to recognise this, and end the current discrimination between the sexes. In the next century, the ratio of working people to retired people will fall sharply, and the burdens on taxpayers will rise. The Government's decision will moderate those burdens, eventually by some £5 billion a year, and so help to ensure that they are sustainable. The basic pension is, and will remain, a cornerstone of the welfare state. The Government are committed to it and to retaining its value."

=== Key points ===
- Personal tax allowances frozen for two consecutive years
- 20p tax band extended by £500 to £3,000 (Note: about £6501 at 2021 prices)
- Blind Person's Tax Allowance to increase from £1,080 (Note: about £2340 at 2021 prices) to £1,200 (Note: about £2600 at 2021 prices)
- Married Couples' Tax Allowance to fall to 20% in 1994 and 15% in 1995
- Mortgage interest relief to fall from 25% to 20% in 1994, and to 15% in 1995
- Corporation Tax profits limit to rise by 20% for smaller companies
- Companies with turnover of £45,000 (Note: about £97518 at 2021 prices) no longer required to register for VAT (rising from £37,600 (Note: about £81482 at 2021 prices))
- Venture capital trusts and Enterprise Investment Scheme announced
- No extension of VAT on newspapers and books
- Measures announced to close tax loopholes are expected to save £2bn (Note: about £4bn at 2021 prices) over three years
- A 3% tax on insurance premiums to be levied from October 1994
- Health spending to be £1bn (Note: about £2bn at 2021 prices) higher in 1994–95, an increase of 1% in real terms
- Education spending to increase by £1bn over next two years
- Spending on policing to increase by 4% in 1994–95, equivalent to funding for a further 5,000 more police officers
- First above-inflation increase in pensions since the late 1970s
- Some benefit measures announced to help alleviate the financial burden of VAT on fuel, including a rise in cold weather payments from £6 to £7
- Help announced for all pensioners
- Plans to boost Home Energy Efficiency scheme by £35m (Note: about £76m at 2021 prices) in 1994
- Pensioners Income Guarantee Bond announced
- All pensioners to get help with fuel bills, not just those on means tested benefit
- Fifteen million people to benefit, with £400m (Note: about £867m at 2021 prices) of extra help next year, and around £1bn extra in the year 1996–97
- Social security benefits to increase by 3.5%
- Unemployment Benefit to be replaced with Jobseeker's Allowance
- Changes in eligibility to Maternity Benefit announced
- New childcare allowance announced for those on Family Credit to begin from Autumn 1994
- Plans announced to introduce Incapacity Benefit to replace Sickness and Invalidity Benefit
- State pension age to be equalised at 65 from 2010, with the changes being phased in from 2010 to 2020
- Plans to stop reimbursing larger companies for Statutory Sick Pay costs from April 1994
- Companies with a National Insurance bill of less than £20,000 (Note: about £43341 at 2021 prices) will continue to be reimbursed for Statutory Sick Pay costs (the amount rising from £16,000)
- Employers' National Insurance costs to be reduced by 0.2% from April 1994 to offset Statutory Sick Pay changes
- All lower rate Employers' National Insurance rates contributions to be reduced by 1% from April 1994
- Air Passenger Duty set to be introduced in October 1994, and set at £5 for European flights and £10 for all other international flights
- Road tax to increase by £5 for cars but not for lorries
- Duty on road fuel to increase by 3%
- Excise duty on packet of 20 cigarettes to rise by 11p
- Duties on other tobacco products to rise by 7.3%
- No increase in the duty on beer or spirits
- Duty on wine increased by 2p per bottle

== Reaction ==
Responding to the statement, John Smith, leader of the Labour Party and the Opposition, described it as "odious in the extreme" and dismissed some of the Social Security measures, particularly those relating to Statutory Sick Pay, as a "vicious attack on the welfare state". He also described the decision to freeze personal allowances for two years as "a devious way of increasing income tax".

On the chancellor's decision to raise the state pension age for women to 65, the journalist and author Katharine Whitehorn was broadly supportive, writing in The Observer, "With women living longer than men it makes no sense to have us quitting work sooner". But Margaret Maxwell wrote in The Independent of her surprise at how little opposition there was to the announcement, and offered a possible explanation: "I suspect that opposition is muted partly because of the way the Government has presented it – in a series of careful leaks over the past two years and much drumming home of demographic facts about an ageing population. Second, the policy seems to be so long term – it starts to bite only in the year 2010 and is not fully operational until 2020. This makes it is hard for anyone under 44 to get steamed up, even though they should, for it is major piece of social engineering that will affect their plans for their entire life."

Outside politics, the budget had a more positive reception from the City of London, with stock market prices rising sharply in its wake.
