= Second Major ministry =

Government of the United Kingdom from 1992 to 1997

- Cabinet of the United Kingdom
- 1992–1997
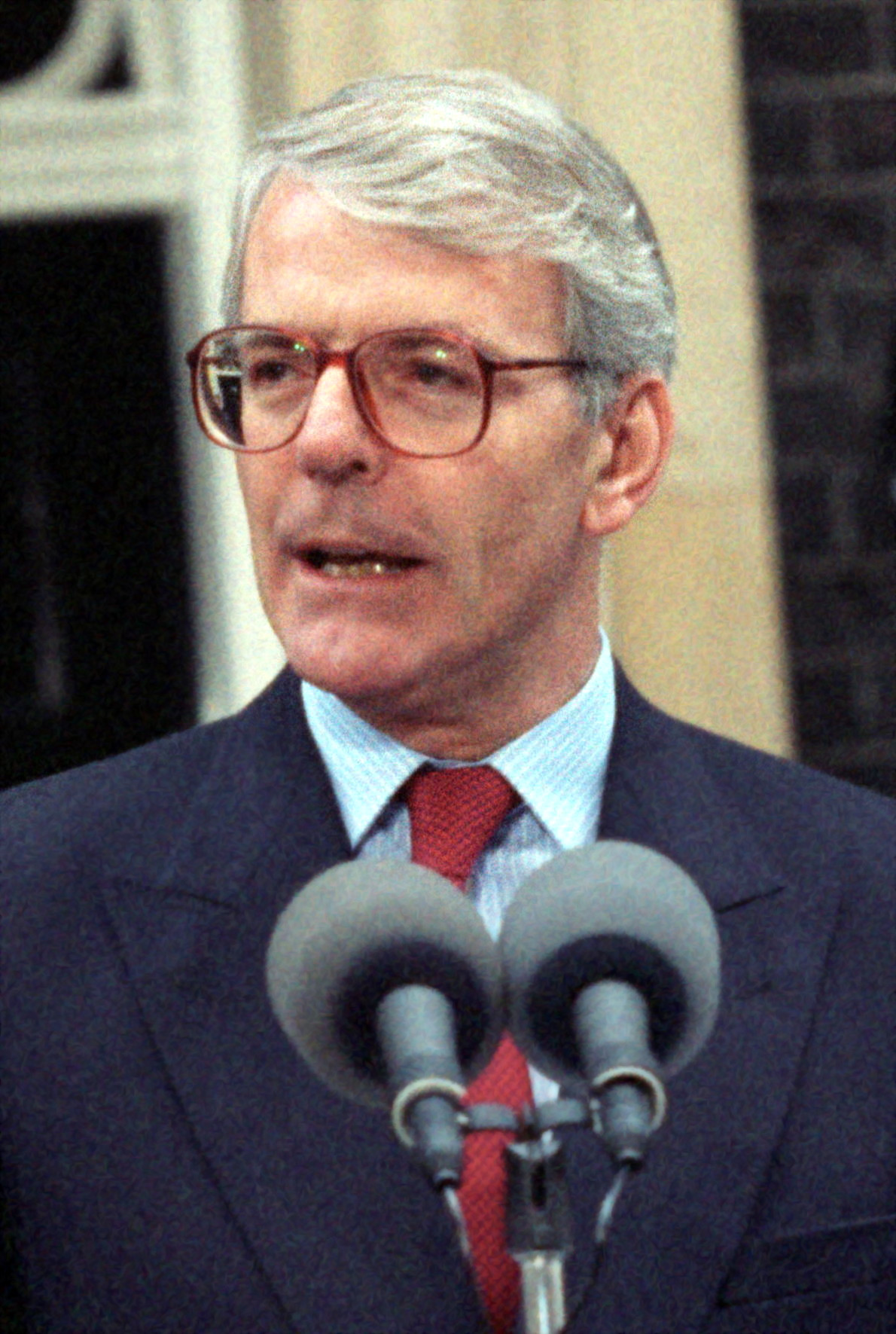
- Major in 1995
- Date formed: 10 April 1992
- Date dissolved: 2 May 1997

People and organisations
- Monarch: Elizabeth II
- Prime Minister: John Major
- Prime Minister's history: Premiership of John Major
- Deputy Prime Minister: Michael Heseltine (1995–1997)
- Total no. of members: 274 appointments
- Member party: Conservative Party
- Status in legislature: Majority (1992–1996); Minority (1996–1997) with dependence on UUP support
- Opposition cabinet: Kinnock shadow cabinet; Smith shadow cabinet; Beckett shadow cabinet; Blair shadow cabinet
- Opposition party: Labour Party
- Opposition leader: Neil Kinnock (1992); John Smith (1992–1994); Margaret Beckett (1994); Tony Blair (1994–1997)

History
- Election: 1992 general election
- Outgoing election: 1997 general election
- Legislature terms: 51st UK Parliament
- Budgets: March 1993 budget; November 1993 budget; 1994 budget; 1995 budget; 1996 budget
- Predecessor: First Major ministry
- Successor: First Blair ministry

John Major formed the second Major ministry following the 1992 general election after being invited by Queen Elizabeth II to begin a new government. His government fell into minority status on 13 December 1996.

== Formation ==
The change of leader from Margaret Thatcher to John Major saw a dramatic turnaround in Conservative support, with the double-digit lead in the opinion polls for the Labour Party being replaced by a narrow Conservative one by the turn of 1991. Although a general election did not have to be held until June 1992, Labour leader Neil Kinnock kept pressurising Major to hold an election during 1991, but Major resisted the calls and there was no election that year.

The recession which began in the autumn of 1990 deepened during 1991, with unemployment standing at nearly 2.5 million by December 1991, compared to 1.6 million just 18 months earlier. Despite this, Tory support in the opinion polls remained relatively strong, with any Labour lead now being by the narrowest of margins, although Labour still made some gains at the expense of the Tories in local elections, and seized the Monmouth seat from the Tories in a by-election.

Major finally called an election for 9 April 1992 which ended the first Major ministry. In a surprise to most pollsters, Major won the election, which led to the formation of the Second Major ministry and a fourth consecutive Conservative term in office.

There was widespread media and public debate as to whether the Labour Party could ever win a general election again, as they had failed to do so in 1992, despite the Conservative government having been in power for over a decade and presiding over a recession for the second time. At the same time, there was much private debate (made public many years later in the memoirs of senior figures including Major himself) within the Conservative government as to whether a fifth successive general election victory was a realistic possibility.

The new term of parliament saw Major gain a new opponent in John Smith, who succeeded Neil Kinnock as Labour leader.

However, the months which followed the 1992 general election saw a series of events which went a long way towards deciding the outcome of the next general election long before it was even on the political horizon.

== Fate ==
On Wednesday 16 September 1992, the pound sterling crashed out of the European Exchange Rate Mechanism after Chancellor of the Exchequer Norman Lamont had invested heavily in trying to keep it there, adjusting interest rates four times in one day as a desperate measure, an event which became known as Black Wednesday, leaving the Conservative government's reputation for economic excellence in tatters. Labour would soon ascend in the opinion polls, and the next few years brought a string of heavy defeats for the Conservatives in local council elections and parliamentary by-elections, with both Labour and the Liberal Democrats benefiting at their expense.

Internal Conservative Party feuding on Europe and the government defeat on the Maastricht Treaty further dented the government's popularity, as did coal mine closures announced in late 1992, and a series of scandals involving MPs.

The end of the recession was declared in April 1993 after nearly three years, and unemployment – which had peaked at nearly 3,000,000 people by the end of 1992 – quickly began to fall. It had fallen below 2,500,000 within two years of the recession's end, and by the end of 1996 it was below the 2,000,000 mark. Freed from the European Exchange Rate Mechanism, the British economy outperformed the rest of the continent for the first time in a generation.

However, the strong economic recovery failed to make much difference to the dismal Conservative performance in the opinion polls. Labour leader John Smith died of a sudden heart attack in May 1994 and was succeeded by Tony Blair, who continued the modernisation process of the party which began under Smith's predecessor Neil Kinnock, by branding the party as: "New Labour", and by the end of that year the opinion polls were showing Labour support as high as 60% – putting them more than 30 points ahead of the Conservatives.

With the Conservative government remaining divided on Europe and much more, John Major, in an attempt to silence his critics and opponents, announced his resignation as party leader – but not as prime minister – in June 1995, triggering a leadership election. He was opposed by John Redwood, the Secretary of State for Wales, and Major won the leadership election without much difficulty.

The Conservative majority of 21 seats was gradually eroded by a string of by-election defeats as well as the defection of one MP to Labour, and by the turn of 1997 the Conservatives were without a majority in the House of Commons.

Major left it until the last possible moment before calling a general election, finally holding it on Thursday, 1 May 1997. He pinned his hopes of election success on a six-week campaign exposing New Labour's policies to scrutiny, as well as pointing towards a booming economy and falling unemployment. However, as the Conservatives had denied responsibility for the recession at the turn of the decade, few voters were willing to give them credit for the economic recovery, and Labour returned to power after eighteen years in opposition, with a 179-seat majority that saw several powerful Conservative figures (most notably Michael Portillo, widely tipped to be the next Leader of the Conservative Party) lose their seats and the loss of all Conservative seats in Wales and Scotland; the Conservatives subsequently suffered their worst general election result of the twentieth century and their place in government was taken by Labour, led by Tony Blair, after four successive parliamentary terms of Conservative Party rule.

The Conservatives did not return to government until 2010, and did not win a parliamentary majority until 2015, having had to form a coalition with the Liberal Democrats in order to form their first government under David Cameron.

== Cabinet ==
=== April 1992 to May 1993 ===
First Cabinet of Second Major ministry
Portfolio	Minister	Term
Cabinet ministers
Prime Minister; First Lord of the Treasury; Minister for the Civil Service	John Major	1990–97
Lord High Chancellor of Great Britain	James Mackay, Baron Mackay of Clashfern	1987–97
Chancellor of the Exchequer	Norman Lamont	1990–93
Foreign Secretary	Douglas Hurd	1989–95
Home Secretary	Kenneth Clarke	1992–93
Minister of Agriculture, Fisheries and Food	John Gummer	1989–93
Secretary of State for Defence	Malcolm Rifkind	1992–95
Secretary of State for Education	John Patten	1992–94
Secretary of State for Employment	Gillian Shephard	1992–93
Secretary of State for National Heritage	David Mellor	1992–92
Secretary of State for National Heritage	Peter Brooke	1992–94
Secretary of State for the Environment	Michael Howard	1992–93
Secretary of State for Health	Virginia Bottomley	1992–95
Secretary of State for Northern Ireland	Sir Patrick Mayhew	1992–97
Leader of the House of Commons; Lord President of the Council	Tony Newton	1992–97
Leader of the House of Lords; Lord Keeper of the Privy Seal	John Wakeham, Baron Wakeham	1992–94
Chancellor of the Duchy of Lancaster	William Waldegrave	1992–94
Secretary of State for Social Security	Peter Lilley	1992–97
Secretary of State for Scotland	Ian Lang	1990–95
Secretary of State for Trade and Industry; President of the Board of Trade	Michael Heseltine	1992–95
Secretary of State for Transport	John MacGregor	1992–94
Chief Secretary to the Treasury	Michael Portillo	1992–94
Secretary of State for Wales	David Hunt	1990–93
Also attending cabinet meetings
Chairman of the Conservative Party	Norman Fowler	1992–94
Chief Whip; Parliamentary Secretary to the Treasury	Richard Ryder	1990–95

==== Changes ====
- On 24 September 1992 David Mellor resigns as Secretary of State for National Heritage following tabloid reporting of an affair with actress Antonia de Sancha. He was replaced by Peter Brooke.

=== May 1993 to July 1994 ===
Second Cabinet of Second Major ministry
Portfolio	Minister	Term
Cabinet ministers
Prime Minister; First Lord of the Treasury; Minister for the Civil Service	John Major	1990–97
Lord High Chancellor of Great Britain	James Mackay, Baron Mackay of Clashfern	1987–97
Chancellor of the Exchequer	Kenneth Clarke	1993–97
Foreign Secretary	Douglas Hurd	1989–95
Home Secretary	Michael Howard	1993–97
Minister of Agriculture, Fisheries and Food	Gillian Shephard	1993–94
Secretary of State for Defence	Malcolm Rifkind	1992–95
Secretary of State for Education	John Patten	1992–94
Secretary of State for Employment	David Hunt	1993–94
Secretary of State for National Heritage	Peter Brooke	1992–94
Secretary of State for the Environment	John Gummer	1993–97
Secretary of State for Health	Virginia Bottomley	1992–95
Secretary of State for Northern Ireland	Sir Patrick Mayhew	1992–97
Leader of the House of Commons; Lord President of the Council	Tony Newton	1992–97
Leader of the House of Lords; Lord Keeper of the Privy Seal	John Wakeham, Baron Wakeham	1992–94
Chancellor of the Duchy of Lancaster	William Waldegrave	1992–94
Secretary of State for Social Security	Peter Lilley	1992–97
Secretary of State for Scotland	Ian Lang	1990–95
Secretary of State for Trade and Industry; President of the Board of Trade	Michael Heseltine	1992–95
Secretary of State for Transport	John MacGregor	1992–94
Chief Secretary to the Treasury	Michael Portillo	1992–94
Secretary of State for Wales	John Redwood	1993–95
Also attending cabinet meetings
Chairman of the Conservative Party	Norman Fowler	1992–94
Chief Whip; Parliamentary Secretary to the Treasury	Richard Ryder	1990–95

=== July 1994 to July 1995 ===
Third Cabinet of Second Major ministry
Portfolio	Minister	Term
Cabinet ministers
Prime Minister; First Lord of the Treasury; Minister for the Civil Service	John Major	1990–97
Lord High Chancellor of Great Britain	James Mackay, Baron Mackay of Clashfern	1987–97
Chancellor of the Exchequer	Kenneth Clarke	1993–97
Foreign Secretary	Douglas Hurd	1989–95
Home Secretary	Michael Howard	1993–97
Minister of Agriculture, Fisheries and Food	William Waldegrave	1994–95
Secretary of State for Defence	Malcolm Rifkind	1992–95
Secretary of State for Education	Gillian Shephard	1994–95
Secretary of State for Employment	Michael Portillo	1994–95
Secretary of State for National Heritage	Stephen Dorrell	1994–95
Secretary of State for the Environment	John Gummer	1993–97
Secretary of State for Health	Virginia Bottomley	1992–95
Secretary of State for Northern Ireland	Sir Patrick Mayhew	1992–97
Leader of the House of Commons; Lord President of the Council	Tony Newton	1992–97
Leader of the House of Lords; Lord Keeper of the Privy Seal	Robert Gacoyne-Cecil, Viscount Cranborne	1994–97
Chancellor of the Duchy of Lancaster	David Hunt	1994–95
Secretary of State for Social Security	Peter Lilley	1992–97
Secretary of State for Scotland	Ian Lang	1990–95
Secretary of State for Trade and Industry; President of the Board of Trade	Michael Heseltine	1992–95
Secretary of State for Transport	Brian Mawhinney	1994–95
Chief Secretary to the Treasury	Jonathan Aitken	1994–95
Secretary of State for Wales	John Redwood	1993–95
Minister without portfolio Chairman of the Conservative Party	Jeremy Hanley	1994–95
Also attending cabinet meetings
Chief Whip; Parliamentary Secretary to the Treasury	Richard Ryder	1990–95

=== July 1995 to May 1997 ===
Fourth Cabinet of Second Major ministry
Portfolio	Minister	Term
Cabinet ministers
Prime Minister; First Lord of the Treasury; Minister for the Civil Service	John Major	1990–97
Deputy Prime Minister; First Secretary of State	Michael Heseltine	1995–97
Lord High Chancellor of Great Britain	James Mackay, Baron Mackay of Clashfern	1987–97
Chancellor of the Exchequer	Kenneth Clarke	1993–97
Foreign Secretary	Malcolm Rifkind	1995–97
Home Secretary	Michael Howard	1993–97
Minister of Agriculture, Fisheries and Food	Douglas Hogg	1995–97
Secretary of State for Defence	Michael Portillo	1995–97
Secretary of State for Education and Employment	Gillian Shephard	1995–97
Secretary of State for National Heritage	Virginia Bottomley	1995–97
Secretary of State for the Environment	John Gummer	1993–97
Secretary of State for Health	Stephen Dorrell	1995–97
Secretary of State for Northern Ireland	Sir Patrick Mayhew	1992–97
Leader of the House of Commons; Lord President of the Council	Tony Newton	1992–97
Leader of the House of Lords; Lord Keeper of the Privy Seal	Robert Gascoyne-Cecil, Viscount Cranborne	1994–97
Chancellor of the Duchy of Lancaster	Roger Freeman	1995–97
Secretary of State for Social Security	Peter Lilley	1992–97
Secretary of State for Scotland	Michael Forsyth	1995–97
Secretary of State for Trade and Industry; President of the Board of Trade	Ian Lang	1995–97
Secretary of State for Transport	Sir George Young, 6th Baronet	1995–97
Chief Secretary to the Treasury	William Waldegrave	1995–97
Secretary of State for Wales	William Hague	1995–97
Minister without portfolio Chairman of the Conservative Party	Brian Mawhinney	1995–97
Also attending cabinet meetings
Chief Whip; Parliamentary Secretary to the Treasury	Alastair Goodlad	1995–97

== List of ministers ==
Members of the Cabinet are in bold face.

Office	Name	Date	Notes
Prime Minister First Lord of the Treasury Minister for the Civil Service	**John Major**	Continued in office – 1 May 1997	
Deputy Prime Minister First Secretary of State	**Michael Heseltine**	20 July 1995	
Lord High Chancellor of Great Britain	**James Mackay, Baron Mackay of Clashfern**	Continued in office	
Leader of the House of Commons Lord President of the Council	**Tony Newton**	10 April 1992	
Leader of the House of Lords Lord Keeper of the Privy Seal	**John Wakeham, Baron Wakeham**	11 April 1992	
Leader of the House of Lords Lord Keeper of the Privy Seal	**Robert Gascoyne-Cecil, Viscount Cranborne**	20 July 1994	
Chancellor of the Exchequer	**Norman Lamont**	28 November 1990	
Chancellor of the Exchequer	**Kenneth Clarke**	27 May 1993	
Chief Secretary to the Treasury	**Michael Portillo**	10 April 1992	
Chief Secretary to the Treasury	**Jonathan Aitken**	20 July 1994	
Chief Secretary to the Treasury	**William Waldegrave**	5 July 1995	
Minister of State for Treasury	Sir John Cope	14 April 1992 – 20 July 1994	also Paymaster General
Minister of State for Treasury	Anthony Nelson	20 July 1994 – 6 July 1995	
Minister of State for Treasury	David Heathcoat-Amory	20 July 1994 – 20 July 1996	also Paymaster General
Parliamentary Secretary to the Treasury Government Chief Whip	Richard Ryder	28 November 1990	
Parliamentary Secretary to the Treasury Government Chief Whip	Alastair Goodlad	5 July 1995	
Financial Secretary to the Treasury	Stephen Dorrell	14 April 1992	
Financial Secretary to the Treasury	Sir George Young, 6th Baronet	20 July 1994	
Financial Secretary to the Treasury	Michael Jack	5 July 1995	
Economic Secretary to the Treasury	Anthony Nelson	14 April 1992	
Economic Secretary to the Treasury	Angela Knight	6 July 1995	
Exchequer Secretary to the Treasury	Phillip Oppenheim	23 June 1996	
Lords of the Treasury	Greg Knight	Continued in office – 27 May 1993	
Lords of the Treasury	Irvine Patnick	Continued in office – 20 July 1994	
Lords of the Treasury	Nicholas Baker	3 December 1990 – 20 July 1994	
Lords of the Treasury	Timothy Wood	14 April 1992 – 5 July 1995	
Lords of the Treasury	Tim Boswell	14 April 1992 – 11 December 1992	
Lords of the Treasury	Timothy Kirkhope	11 December 1992 – 5 July 1995	
Lords of the Treasury	Andrew MacKay	27 May 1993 – 17 October 1995	
Lords of the Treasury	Derek Conway	20 July 1994 – 23 July 1996	
Lords of the Treasury	Andrew Mitchell	20 July 1994 – 5 July 1995	
Lords of the Treasury	Bowen Wells	5 July 1995 – 1 May 1997	
Lords of the Treasury	Simon Burns	5 July 1995 – 23 July 1996	
Lords of the Treasury	David Willetts	5 July 1995 – 28 November 1995	
Lords of the Treasury	Michael Bates	17 October 1995 – 11 December 1996	
Lords of the Treasury	Liam Fox	28 November 1995 – 23 July 1996	
Lords of the Treasury	Patrick McLoughlin	23 July 1996 – 1 May 1997	
Lords of the Treasury	Roger Knapman	23 July 1996 – 1 May 1997	
Lords of the Treasury	Richard Ottaway	23 July 1996 – 1 May 1997	
Lords of the Treasury	Gyles Brandreth	11 December 1996 – 1 May 1997	
Assistant Whips	Timothy Kirkhope	25 July 1990 - 15 December 1992	
Assistant Whips	David Davis	3 December 1990 - 28 May 1993	
Assistant Whips	Andrew MacKay	15 April 1992 - 7 June 1993	
Assistant Whips	Robert Hughes	15 April 1992 - 20 July 1994	
Assistant Whips	James Arbuthnot	15 April 1992 - 20 July 1994	
Assistant Whips	Andrew Mitchell	15 December 1992 -20 July 1994	
Assistant Whips	Michael Brown	7 June 1993 - 9 May 1994	
Assistant Whips	Derek Conway	7 June 1993 - 20 July 1994	
Assistant Whips	Bowen Wells	9 May 1994 - 7 July 1995	
Assistant Whips	Simon Burns	20 July 1994 - 7 July 1995	
Assistant Whips	David Willetts	20 July 1994 - 7 July 1995	
Assistant Whips	Michael Bates	20 July 1994 - 17 October 1995	
Assistant Whips	Liam Fox	20 July 1994 - 29 November 1995	
Assistant Whips	Patrick McLoughlin	7 July 1995 - 23 July 1996	
Assistant Whips	Roger Knapman	7 July 1995 - 23 July 1996	
Assistant Whips	Gary Streeter	7 July 1995 - 3 June 1996	
Assistant Whips	Richard Ottaway	17 October 1995 - 23 July 1996	
Assistant Whips	Gyles Brandreth	29 November 1995 - 12 December 1996	
Assistant Whips	Seb Coe	6 June 1996 - 2 May 1997	
Assistant Whips	Anthony Coombs	23 July 1996 - 2 May 1997	
Assistant Whips	Jacqui Lait	23 July 1996 - 2 May 1997	
Assistant Whips	Peter Ainsworth	23 July 1996 - 2 May 1997	
Assistant Whips	Matthew Carrington	12 December 1996 - 2 May 1997	
Foreign Secretary	**Douglas Hurd**	26 October 1989	
Foreign Secretary	**Malcolm Rifkind**	5 July 1995	
Minister of State for Foreign and Commonwealth Affairs	Lynda Chalker, Baroness Chalker of Wallasey	Continued in office – 1 May 1997	also Minister of Overseas Development; created Baroness Chalker of Wallasey 24 April 1992
Minister of State for Foreign and Commonwealth Affairs	Tristan Garel-Jones	Continued in office – 27 May 1993	
Minister of State for Foreign and Commonwealth Affairs	Douglas Hogg	Continued in office – 5 July 1995	
Minister of State for Foreign and Commonwealth Affairs	Alastair Goodlad	15 April 1992 – 5 July 1995	
Minister of State for Foreign and Commonwealth Affairs	David Heathcoat-Amory	27 May 1993 – 20 July 1994	
Minister of State for Foreign and Commonwealth Affairs	David Davis	20 July 1994 – 1 May 1997	
Minister of State for Foreign and Commonwealth Affairs	Jeremy Hanley	5 July 1995 – 1 May 1997	
Minister of State for Foreign and Commonwealth Affairs	Sir Nicholas Bonsor	5 July 1995 – 1 May 1997	
Under-Secretary of State for Foreign and Commonwealth Affairs	Mark Lennox-Boyd	Continued in office - 20 July 1994	
Under-Secretary of State for Foreign and Commonwealth Affairs	Tony Baldry	20 July 1994 - 5 July 1995	
Under-Secretary of State for Foreign and Commonwealth Affairs	Liam Fox	23 July 1996	
Minister for Overseas Development	Lynda Chalker	Continued in office	also Minister of State for Foreign and Commonwealth Affairs; created Baroness Chalker of Wallasey 24 April 1992
Home Secretary	**Kenneth Clarke**	11 April 1992	
Home Secretary	**Michael Howard**	27 May 1993	
Minister of State for Home Affairs	Robert Shirley, 13th Earl Ferrers	Continued in office – 20 July 1994	
Minister of State for Home Affairs	Michael Jack	14 April 1992 – 27 May 1993	
Minister of State for Home Affairs	Peter Lloyd	14 April 1992 – 20 July 1994	
Minister of State for Home Affairs	David Maclean	27 May 1993 – 1 May 1997	
Minister of State for Home Affairs	Michael Forsyth	20 July 1994 – 5 July 1995	
Minister of State for Home Affairs	Emily Blatch, Baroness Blatch	20 July 1994 – 1 May 1997	
Minister of State for Home Affairs	Ann Widdecombe	5 July 1995 – 1 May 1997	
Under-Secretary of State for Home Affairs	Charles Wardle	15 April 1992 – 20 July 1994	
Under-Secretary of State for Home Affairs	Nicholas Baker	20 July 1994 – 17 October 1995	
Under-Secretary of State for Home Affairs	Timothy Kirkhope	17 October 1995 – 1 May 1997	
Under-Secretary of State for Home Affairs	Tom Sackville	28 November 1995 – 1 May 1997	
Minister of Agriculture, Fisheries and Food	**John Gummer**	Continued in office	
Minister of Agriculture, Fisheries and Food	**Gillian Shephard**	24 May 1993	
Minister of Agriculture, Fisheries and Food	**William Waldegrave**	20 July 1994	
Minister of Agriculture, Fisheries and Food	**Douglas Hogg**	5 July 1995	
Minister of State for Agriculture, Fisheries and Food	David Curry	14 April 1992 – 27 May 1993	
Minister of State for Agriculture, Fisheries and Food	Michael Jack	27 May 1993 – 5 July 1995	
Minister of State for Agriculture, Fisheries and Food	Tony Baldry	5 July 1995 – 1 May 1997	
Under-Secretary of State for Agriculture, Fisheries and Food	Nicholas Soames	14 April 1992 – 20 July 1994	
Under-Secretary of State for Agriculture, Fisheries and Food	Frederick Curzon, 7th Earl Howe	14 April 1992 – 5 July 1995	
Under-Secretary of State for Agriculture, Fisheries and Food	Angela Browning	20 July 1994 – 1 May 1997	
Under-Secretary of State for Agriculture, Fisheries and Food	Tim Boswell	5 July 1995 – 1 May 1997	
Secretary of State for Defence	**Malcolm Rifkind**	15 April 1992	
Secretary of State for Defence	**Michael Portillo**	5 July 1995	
Minister of State for the Armed Forces	Archie Hamilton	Continued in office	
Minister of State for the Armed Forces	Jeremy Hanley	27 May 1993	
Minister of State for the Armed Forces	Nicholas Soames	20 July 1994	
Minister of State for Defence Procurement	Jonathan Aitken	14 April 1992	
Minister of State for Defence Procurement	Roger Freeman	20 July 1994	
Minister of State for Defence Procurement	James Arbuthnot	6 July 1995	
Under-Secretary of State for Defence	Robert Gascoyne-Cecil, Viscount Cranborne	22 April 1992 – 20 July 1994	
Under-Secretary of State for Defence	Oliver Eden, 8th Baron Henley	20 July 1994 – 6 July 1995	
Under-Secretary of State for Defence	Frederick Curzon, 7th Earl Howe	6 July 1995 – 2 May 1997	
Secretary of State for Education	**John Patten**	10 April 1992	
Secretary of State for Education	**Gillian Shephard**	20 July 1994	Secretary of State for Education and Employment after 5 July 1995
Minister of State, Education	Emily Blatch, Baroness Blatch	14 April 1992 – 20 July 1994	
Minister of State, Education	Eric Forth	20 July 1994 – 2 May 1997	Minister of State, Education and Employment after 5 July 1995
Minister of State, Education and Employment	Oliver Eden, 8th Baron Henley	6 July 1995 – 2 May 1997	
Under-Secretary of State, Education	Eric Forth	14 April 1992 – 20 July 1994	
Under-Secretary of State, Education	Nigel Forman	14 April 1992 – 11 December 1992	
Under-Secretary of State, Education	Tim Boswell	19 December 1992 – 6 July 1995	
Under-Secretary of State, Education	Robin Squire	27 May 1993 – 2 May 1997	Under-Secretary of State, Education and Employment after 5 July 1995
Under-Secretary of State, Education and Employment	James Paice	7 July 1995 – 2 May 1997	
Under-Secretary of State, Education and Employment	Cheryl Gillan	6 July 1995 – 2 May 1997	
Secretary of State for Employment	**Gillian Shephard**	12 April 1992	
Secretary of State for Employment	**David Hunt**	27 May 1993	
Secretary of State for Employment	**Michael Portillo**	20 July 1994	Merged with the Office of Education 5 July 1995
Minister of State, Employment	Michael Forsyth	14 April 1992 – 20 July 1994	
Minister of State, Employment	Ann Widdecombe	20 July 1994 – 5 July 1995	
Under-Secretary of State, Employment	Nicholas Lowther, 2nd Viscount Ullswater	Continued in office – 16 September 1993	
Under-Secretary of State, Employment	Patrick McLoughlin	14 April 1992 – 27 May 1993	
Under-Secretary of State, Employment	Ann Widdecombe	27 May 1993 – 20 July 1994	
Under-Secretary of State, Employment	Oliver Eden, 8th Baron Henley	16 September 1993 – 20 July 1994	
Under-Secretary of State, Employment	James Paice	20 July 1994 – 5 July 1995	
Under-Secretary of State, Employment	Phillip Oppenheim	20 July 1994 – 5 July 1995	
Minister of State, Energy	Timothy Eggar	15 April 1992 – 20 July 1994	under Office of Trade and Industry; became Minister of State, Energy and Industry 20 July 1994
Secretary of State for the Environment	**Michael Howard**	11 April 1992	
Secretary of State for the Environment	**John Gummer**	27 May 1993	
Minister of State for Local Government	John Redwood	15 April 1992	
Minister of State for Local Government	David Curry	27 May 1993	
Minister of State for Housing	Sir George Young, 6th Baronet	28 November 1990	
Minister of State for Housing	The Viscount Ullswater	20 July 1994	Post renamed Minister of State for Construction 6 July 1995
Minister of State for Construction	Robert Jones	6 July 1995	
Minister of State for Environment and Countryside	David Maclean	14 April 1992	
Minister of State for Environment and Countryside	Tim Yeo	27 May 1993	
Minister of State for Environment and Countryside	Robert Atkins	7 January 1994	
Minister of State for Environment and Countryside	Robert Shirley, 13th Earl Ferrers	6 July 1995	
Under-Secretary of State, Environment	Tony Baldry	28 November 1990 – 20 July 1994	
Under-Secretary of State, Environment	Thomas Galbraith, 2nd Baron Strathclyde	15 April 1992 – 16 September 1993	
Under-Secretary of State, Environment	Robin Squire	15 April 1992 – 27 May 1993	
Under-Secretary of State, Environment	Jean Denton, Baroness Denton of Wakefield	16 September 1993 – 11 January 1994	
Under-Secretary of State, Environment	Arthur Gore, 9th Earl of Arran	11 January 1994 – 20 July 1994	
Under-Secretary of State, Environment	Sir Paul Beresford	20 July 1994 – 2 May 1997	
Under-Secretary of State, Environment	Robert Jones	20 July 1994 – 6 July 1995	
Under-Secretary of State, Environment	James Clappison	6 July 1995 – 2 May 1997	
Secretary of State for Health	**Virginia Bottomley**	10 April 1992	
Secretary of State for Health	**Stephen Dorrell**	5 July 1995	
Minister of State, Health	Brian Mawhinney	14 April 1992	
Minister of State, Health	Gerry Malone	20 July 1994	
Under-Secretary of State, Health and Social Security	Tom Sackville	14 April 1992 – 29 November 1995	
Under-Secretary of State, Health and Social Security	Julia Cumberlege, Baroness Cumberlege	14 April 1992 – 2 May 1997	
Under-Secretary of State, Health and Social Security	Tim Yeo	15 April 1992 – 27 May 1993	
Under-Secretary of State, Health and Social Security	John Bowis	27 May 1993 – 23 July 1996	
Under-Secretary of State, Health and Social Security	John Horam	29 November 1995 – 2 May 1997	
Under-Secretary of State, Health and Social Security	Simon Burns	23 July 1996 – 2 May 1997	
Secretary of State for Social Security	**Peter Lilley**	10 April 1992	
Minister of State, Social Security	Nicholas Scott	Continued in office – 20 July 1994	
Minister of State, Social Security	William Hague	20 July 1994 – 5 July 1995	
Minister of State, Social Security	John MacKay, Baron MacKay of Ardbrecknish	20 July 1994 – 2 May 1997	
Minister of State, Social Security	Alistair Burt	6 July 1995 – 2 May 1997	
Under-Secretary of State, Social Security	Oliver Eden, 8th Baron Henley	Continued in office - 16 September 1993	
Under-Secretary of State, Social Security	Ann Widdecombe	30 November 1990 – 27 May 1993	
Under-Secretary of State, Social Security	Alistair Burt	14 April 1992 – 6 July 1995	
Under-Secretary of State, Social Security	William Hague	27 May 1993 – 20 July 1994	
Under-Secretary of State, Social Security	William Astor, 4th Viscount Astor	16 September 1993 – 20 July 1994	
Under-Secretary of State, Social Security	James Arbuthnot	20 July 1994 – 6 July 1995	
Under-Secretary of State, Social Security	Roger Evans	20 July 1994 – 2 May 1997	
Under-Secretary of State, Social Security	Andrew Mitchell	6 July 1995 – 2 May 1997	
Under-Secretary of State, Social Security	Oliver Heald	6 July 1995 – 2 May 1997	
Chancellor of the Duchy of Lancaster	**William Waldegrave**	11 April 1992	also Minister for the Public Service
Chancellor of the Duchy of Lancaster	**David Hunt**	20 July 1994	also Minister for the Public Service
Chancellor of the Duchy of Lancaster	**Roger Freeman**	5 July 1995	also Minister for the Public Service
Parliamentary Secretary for the Public Service	Robert V. Jackson	15 April 1992	
Parliamentary Secretary for the Public Service	David Davis	27 May 1993	
Parliamentary Secretary for the Public Service	Robert Hughes	20 July 1994	
Parliamentary Secretary for the Public Service	John Horam	6 March 1995	
Parliamentary Secretary for the Public Service	David Willetts	28 November 1995	
Parliamentary Secretary for the Public Service	vacant	20 July 1996	
Parliamentary Secretary for the Public Service	Michael Bates	16 December 1996	
Secretary of State for National Heritage	**David Mellor**	11 April 1992	
Secretary of State for National Heritage	**Peter Brooke**	25 September 1992	
Secretary of State for National Heritage	**Stephen Dorrell**	20 July 1994	
Secretary of State for National Heritage	**Virginia Bottomley**	5 July 1995	
Minister of State, National Heritage	Iain Sproat	6 July 1995	
Under-Secretary of State, National Heritage	Robert Key	14 April 1992 – 27 May 1993	
Under-Secretary of State, National Heritage	Iain Sproat	27 May 1993 – 6 July 1995	
Under-Secretary of State, National Heritage	William Astor, 4th Viscount Astor	20 July 1994 – 6 July 1995	
Under-Secretary of State, National Heritage	Richard Fletcher-Vane, 2nd Baron Inglewood	6 July 1995 – 2 May 1997	
Secretary of State for Northern Ireland	**Sir Patrick Mayhew**	10 April 1992	
Minister of State, Northern Ireland	Robert Atkins	14 April 1992 – 11 January 1994	
Minister of State, Northern Ireland	Michael Mates	15 April 1992 – 24 June 1993	
Minister of State, Northern Ireland	Sir John Wheeler	25 June 1993 – 2 May 1997	
Minister of State, Northern Ireland	Michael Ancram	11 January 1994 – 2 May 1997	
Under-Secretary of State, Northern Ireland	Jeremy Hanley	3 December 1990 – 27 May 1993	
Under-Secretary of State, Northern Ireland	Arthur Gore, 9th Earl of Arran	22 April 1992 – 11 January 1994	
Under-Secretary of State, Northern Ireland	Michael Ancram	27 May 1993 – 5 January 1994	
Under-Secretary of State, Northern Ireland	Jean Denton, Baroness Denton of Wakefield	20 July 1994 – 2 May 1997	
Under-Secretary of State, Northern Ireland	Tim Smith	6 January 1994 – 20 October 1994	
Under-Secretary of State, Northern Ireland	Malcolm Moss	25 October 1994 – 2 May 1997	
Paymaster General	Sir John Cope	14 April 1992	also Minister of State, Treasury
Paymaster General	David Heathcoat-Amory	20 July 1994	also Minister of State, Treasury
Paymaster General	David Willetts	20 July 1996	
Paymaster General	Michael Bates	16 December 1996	
Minister without Portfolio	**Jeremy Hanley**	20 July 1994 – 5 July 1995	
Minister without Portfolio	**Brian Mawhinney**	5 July 1995 – 2 May 1997	
Secretary of State for Scotland	**Ian Lang**	28 November 1990	
Secretary of State for Scotland	**Michael Forsyth**	5 July 1995	
Minister of State for Scotland	Peter Fraser, Baron Fraser of Carmyllie	14 April 1992 – 6 July 1995	
Minister of State for Scotland	Lord James Douglas-Hamilton	6 July 1995 – 2 May 1997	
Under-Secretary of State for Scotland	Lord James Douglas-Hamilton	Continued in office – 6 July 1995	
Under-Secretary of State for Scotland	Allan Stewart	28 November 1990 – 8 February 1995	
Under-Secretary of State for Scotland	Sir Hector Monro	14 April 1992 – 6 July 1995	
Under-Secretary of State for Scotland	George Kynoch	8 February 1995 – 2 May 1997	
Under-Secretary of State for Scotland	James Lindesay-Bethune, 16th Earl of Lindsay	6 July 1995 – 2 May 1997	
Under-Secretary of State for Scotland	Raymond Robertson	6 July 1995 – 2 May 1997	
Minister for Consumer Affairs	Robert Shirley, 13th Earl Ferrers	20 July 1994	Under Office of Trade and Industry; office abolished 6 July 1995
Minister for Trade	Richard Needham (6th Earl of Kilmorey)	14 April 1992	
Minister for Trade	Anthony Nelson	6 July 1995	
Secretary of State for Trade and Industry	**Michael Heseltine**	10 April 1992	
Secretary of State for Trade and Industry	**Ian Lang**	5 July 1995	
Minister for Industry	Tim Sainsbury	15 April 1992 - 20 July 1994	
Minister of State for Trade and Industry	Thomas Galbraith, 2nd Baron Strathclyde	11 January 1994 – 20 July 1994	
Minister of State for Trade and Industry	Peter Fraser, Baron Fraser of Carmyllie	6 July 1995 – 2 May 1997	
Minister of State, Energy and Industry	Timothy Eggar	20 July 1994	
Minister of State, Energy and Industry	Greg Knight	23 July 1996	
Under-Secretary of State for Trade and Industry	Edward Leigh	Continued in office – 27 May 1993	
Under-Secretary of State for Trade and Industry	Neil Hamilton	14 April 1992 – 25 October 1994	
Under-Secretary of State for Trade and Industry	Jean Denton, Baroness Denton of Wakefield	14 April 1992 – 16 September 1993	
Under-Secretary of State for Trade and Industry	Jonathan Evans	27 October 1994 – 29 November 1995	
Under-Secretary of State for Trade and Industry	Patrick McLoughlin	27 May 1993 – 20 July 1994	
Under-Secretary of State for Trade and Industry	Thomas Galbraith, 2nd Baron Strathclyde	16 September 1993 – 11 January 1994	
Under-Secretary of State for Trade and Industry	Charles Wardle	20 July 1994 – 11 February 1995	
Under-Secretary of State for Trade and Industry	Ian Taylor	20 July 1994 – 2 May 1997	
Under-Secretary of State for Trade and Industry	Richard Page	14 February 1995 – 2 May 1997	
Under-Secretary of State for Trade and Industry	Phillip Oppenheim	7 July 1995 – 2 May 1997	
Under-Secretary of State for Trade and Industry	John Mark Taylor	29 November 1995 – 2 May 1997	
Secretary of State for Transport	**John MacGregor**	10 April 1992	
Secretary of State for Transport	**Brian Mawhinney**	20 July 1994	
Secretary of State for Transport	**Sir George Young, 6th Baronet**	5 July 1995	
Minister for Public Transport	Roger Freeman	28 November 1990 – 20 July 1994	
Minister for Railways and Roads	Malcolm Sinclair, 20th Earl of Caithness	14 April 1992 – 11 January 1994	
Minister for Railways and Roads	John Watts	20 July 1994 – 2 May 1997	
Under-Secretary of State for Transport	Kenneth Carlisle	14 April 1992 – 27 May 1993	
Under-Secretary of State for Transport	Steven Norris	14 April 1992 – 23 July 1996	
Under-Secretary of State for Transport	Robert Key	27 May 1993 – 20 July 1994	
Under-Secretary of State for Transport	John MacKay, Baron MacKay of Ardbrecknish	11 January 1994 – 20 July 1994	
Under-Secretary of State for Transport	Giles Goschen, 4th Viscount Goschen	20 July 1994 – 2 May 1997	
Under-Secretary of State for Transport	John Bowis	23 July 1996 – 2 May 1997	
Secretary of State for Wales	**David Hunt**	Continued in office	
Secretary of State for Wales	**John Redwood**	27 May 1993	
Secretary of State for Wales	**David Hunt**	26 June 1995	(Acting)
Secretary of State for Wales	**William Hague**	5 July 1995	
Minister of State for Wales	Wyn Roberts	Continued in office – 20 July 1994	
Under-Secretary of State for Wales	Nicholas Bennett	3 December 1990 – 14 April 1992	
Under-Secretary of State for Wales	Gwilym Jones	14 April 1992 – 2 May 1997	
Under-Secretary of State for Wales	Rod Richards	20 July 1994 – 2 June 1996	
Under-Secretary of State for Wales	Jonathan Evans	2 June 1996 – 2 May 1997	
Attorney General	Sir Patrick Mayhew	Continued in office	
Attorney General	Sir Nicholas Lyell	9 April 1992	
Solicitor General	Sir Derek Spencer	15 April 1992	
Lord Advocate	Alan Rodger, Baron Rodger of Earlsferry	15 April 1992	
Lord Advocate	Donald Mackay, Baron Mackay of Drumadoon	7 November 1995	
Solicitor General for Scotland	Thomas Dawson	15 April 1992	Not an MP
Solicitor General for Scotland	Donald Mackay	4 May 1995	Not an MP
Solicitor General for Scotland	Paul Cullen	7 November 1995	Not an MP
Treasurer of the Household	David Heathcoat-Amory	15 April 1992	
Treasurer of the Household	Greg Knight	7 June 1993	
Treasurer of the Household	Andrew MacKay	23 July 1996	
Comptroller of the Household	David Lightbown	28 November 1990	
Comptroller of the Household	Timothy Wood	7 July 1995	
Vice-Chamberlain of the Household	Sydney Chapman	15 April 1992	
Vice-Chamberlain of the Household	Timothy Kirkhope	7 July 1995	
Vice-Chamberlain of the Household	Andrew MacKay	18 October 1995	
Vice-Chamberlain of the Household	Derek Conway	23 July 1996	
Captain of the Gentlemen-at-Arms	Alexander Fermor-Hesketh, 3rd Baron Hesketh	2 May 1991	
Captain of the Gentlemen-at-Arms	Nicholas Lowther, 2nd Viscount Ullswater	16 September 1993	
Captain of the Gentlemen-at-Arms	Thomas Galbraith, 2nd Baron Strathclyde	20 July 1994	
Captain of the Yeomen of the Guard	Michael Bowes-Lyon, 18th Earl of Strathmore and Kinghorne	30 December 1991	
Captain of the Yeomen of the Guard	Arthur Gore, 9th Earl of Arran	20 July 1994	
Captain of the Yeomen of the Guard	Richard Fletcher-Vane, 2nd Baron Inglewood	January 1995	
Captain of the Yeomen of the Guard	Nicholas Cavendish, 6th Baron Chesham	8 July 1995	
Lords-in-Waiting	Hugh Cavendish, Baron Cavendish of Furness	Continued in office – 22 April 1993	
Lords-in-Waiting	William Astor, 4th Viscount Astor	Continued in office – 16 September 1993	
Lords-in-Waiting	Richard Gerard Long, 4th Viscount Long	Continued in office – 2 May 1997	
Lords-in-Waiting	Colwyn Philipps, 3rd Viscount St Davids	22 April 1992 – 20 July 1994	
Lords-in-Waiting	Giles Goschen, 4th Viscount Goschen	22 April 1992 – 20 July 1994	
Lords-in-Waiting	Jean Barker, Baroness Trumpington	22 April 1992 – 2 May 1997	
Lords-in-Waiting	John MacKay, Baron MacKay of Ardbrecknish	15 October 1993 – 11 January 1994	
Lords-in-Waiting	Luke White, 6th Baron Annaly	18 March 1994 – 20 July 1994	
Lords-in-Waiting	Ralph Palmer, 12th Baron Lucas	21 July 1994 – 2 May 1997	
Lords-in-Waiting	Doreen Miller, Baroness Miller of Hendon	21 July 1994 – 2 May 1997	
Lords-in-Waiting	Richard Fletcher-Vane, 2nd Baron Inglewood	21 July 1994 – January 1995	
Lords-in-Waiting	James Lindesay-Bethune, 16th Earl of Lindsay	12 January 1995 – 6 July 1995	
Lords-in-Waiting	Patrick Stopford, 9th Earl of Courtown	8 July 1995 – 2 May 1997	

Preceded by First Major ministry	Government of the United Kingdom; 1992–1997	Succeeded by First Blair ministry
