= March 1993 United Kingdom budget =

- Presented: 16 March 1993
- Country: United Kingdom
- Parliament: 51st
- Party: Conservative Party
- Chancellor: Norman Lamont

The March 1993 United Kingdom budget (officially titled A budget for sustained recovery and a budget for jobs) was delivered by Norman Lamont, the Chancellor of the Exchequer, to the House of Commons on 16 March 1993. It was the third and final budget to be presented by Lamont during his tenure as chancellor, and the final spring budget to be outlined before the Conservatives unified their tax and spending plans into one budget statement.

Lamont introduced a series of phased tax increases, including announcing a VAT levy of 8% on domestic fuel from 1 April 1994, which would be raised to 17.5% the next year, as well as making changes to income tax and raising the stamp duty threshold. March 1993 also marks the first occasion on which a chancellor cited the environment as a reason for raising taxes, but this failed to convince green campaigners the tax raises were justified. John Smith, the leader of the Opposition Labour Party, dismissed the budget as "a shameful budget from a cynical government that has broken its election promises". Prime Minister John Major described it as "the right budget, at the right time, from the right chancellor" before replacing Lamont a few weeks later with Kenneth Clarke.

== Overview ==
The March 1993 budget was broadly neutral for the year ahead, but the chancellor introduced a number of tax rises that would take effect in successive years. Chief amongst these was his decision to raise VAT on domestic energy bills, which would be phased in from April 1994 when VAT of 8% would be levied. This was scheduled to increase to 17.5% from April 1995. Increases in a number of income-related benefits were also announced as a way to offset the extra cost. Lamont emphasized the positive impact he believed raising VAT on fuel would have for the environment, the first time a chancellor had cited the environment as a reason for increasing taxes. Minor changes were made to the 20p rate of income tax, but the two other tax bands remained intact, effectively making them tax rises. The stamp duty threshold on the purchase of property was raised, reducing the cost of buying a house valued at between £30,000 and £60,000 by up to £600.

=== Key points ===
- 20% rate of income tax extended by £500 to £2,500
- 25% basic rate of income tax frozen
- 40% higher income tax rate frozen at £23,700
- Personal tax allowances frozen
- VAT on domestic fuel to be charged at 8% from April 1994, rising to 17.5% from April 1995
- Stamp duty threshold increased
- Mortgage relief reduced to 20%
- Excise duty on petrol increased by 3%
- Duty on packet of 20 cigarettes increased above rate of inflation
- Duty on beer increased above rate of inflation
- Excise duty increase excludes Scotch whisky

== Reaction ==
John Smith, the leader of the Opposition Labour Party, dismissed the chancellor's statement as "a shameful budget from a cynical government that has broken its election promises", while green campaigners viewed Lamont's reference to the environment as nothing more than an excuse for raising taxes to pay off the public deficit.

An Early day motion condemning the budget's impact on those on low wages and the poor, and signed by 70 MPs, was tabled before the House of Commons on 17 March 1993.

== Aftermath ==
The March 1993 budget was the last to be presented in the spring before the Conservatives switched budget statements to the autumn so their tax and spending plans could be outlined simultaneously. It would also be Norman Lamont's final budget. The planned introduction of VAT on domestic fuel and power went ahead in April 1994, but the increase from 8% to 17.5% in April 1995 was scuppered in December 1994, after the government lost the vote in parliament.

Although Prime Minister John Major hailed it as "the right budget, at the right time, from the right chancellor", Lamont would be replaced by Home Secretary Kenneth Clarke in a cabinet reshuffle two months later. Clarke went on to deliver the budget of November 1993, and continued to serve as chancellor for the rest of the parliament.
