= C. Wright Mills Award =

The C. Wright Mills Award is a distinction awarded annually by the Society for the Study of Social Problems to the author of the book that "best exemplifies outstanding social science research and a great understanding the individual and society in the tradition of the distinguished sociologist, C. Wright Mills."

== Recipients ==
Year	Name	Book Title	Citations
1964	David Matza	Delinquency and Drift.	
1965	Robert Boguslaw	The New Utopians.	
1966	Jerome H. Skolnick	Justice Without Trial.	
1967	Co-Winner, Elliot Liebow	Tally's Corner: A Study of Negro Street Corner Men.	
1967	Co-Winner, Travis Hirschi and Hanan C. Selvin	Delinquency Research: An Appraisal of Analytical Methods.	
1968	Gerald D. Suttles	The Social Order of the Slum: Ethnicity and Territory in the Inner City.	
1969	Laud Humphreys	Tearoom Trade: Impersonal Sex in Public Places	
1970	Jacqueline P. Wiseman	Stations of the Lost: The Treatment of Skid Row Alcoholics.	
1971	Frances Fox Piven and Richard A. Cloward	Regulating the Poor: The Functions of Public Welfare	
1972	David M. Gordon	Theories of Poverty and Underemployment: Orthodox, Radical, and Dual Labor Market Perspectives	
1973	Co-Winner, James B. Rule	Private Lives and Public Surveillance: Social Control in the Computer Age	
1973	Co-Winner, Isaac D. Balbus	The Dialectics of Legal Repression: Black Rebels before the American Courts	
1974	Harry Braverman	Labor and Monopoly Capital: The Degradation of Work in the Twentieth Century	
1975	Mary O. Furner	Advocacy and Objectivity: A Crisis in the Professionalization of American Social Science	
1976	Janice E. Perlman	The Myth of Marginality: Urban Poverty and Politics in Rio de Janeiro	
1977	Rosabeth Moss Kanter	Men and Women of the Corporation	
1978	Walter Korpi	The Working Class in Welfare Capitalism: Work, Unions and Politics in Sweden	
1979	Theda Skocpol	States and Social Revolutions: A Comparative Analysis of France, Russia, and China	
1980	Michael Lipsky	Street Level Bureaucracy: Dilemmas of the Individual in Public Services	
1981	Judith Lewis Herman	Father-Daughter Incest	
1982	Paul Starr	The Social Transformation of American Medicine: The Rise of a Sovereign Profession and the Making of a Vast Industry	
1983	Manuel Castells	The City and the Grassroots: A Cross-Cultural Theory of Urban Social Movements	
1984	Co-Winner, Michael Useem	The Inner Circle: Large Corporations and the Rise of Business Political Activity in the U.S. and U.K.	
1984	Co-Winner, Richard Madsen	Morality and Power in a Chinese Village	
1985	Viviana Zelizer	Pricing the Priceless Child: The Changing Social Value of Children	
1986	Co-Winner, Diana E. H. Russell	The Secret Trauma: Incest in the Lives of Girls and Women	
1986	Co-Winner, Charles Tilly	The Contentious French: Four Centuries of Popular Struggle	
1986	Co-Winner, Joyce Rothschild and J. Allen Whitt	The Cooperative Workplace: Potentials and Dilemmas of Organizational Democracy and Participation	
1987	William J. Wilson	The Truly Disadvantaged: The Inner City, The Underclass, and Public Policy	
1988	Co-Winner, Iván Szelényi	Socialist Entrepreneurs: Embourgeoisement in Rural Hungary	
1988	Co-Winner, John R. Sutton	Stubborn Children: Controlling Delinquency in the United States, 1640-1981	
1989	Co-Winner, Doug McAdam	Freedom Summer	
1989	Co-Winner, Alan Wolfe	Whose Keeper? Social Science and Moral Obligation	
1990	Patricia Hill Collins	Black Feminist Thought: Knowledge, Consciousness, and the Politics of Empowerment	
1991	Sharon Zukin	Landscapes of Power: From Detroit to Disney World	
1992	Roger Lancaster	Life is Hard: Machismo, Danger, and the Intimacy of Power in Nicaragua	
1993	David Wagner	Checkerboard Square: Culture and Resistance in a Homeless Community	
1994	Robert Thomas	What Machines Can’t Do: Politics and Technology in the Industrial Enterprise	
1995	Co-Winner, Philippe Bourgois	In Search of Respect: Selling Crack in El Barrio	
1995	Co-Winner, Melvin L. Oliver and Thomas M. Shapiro	Black Wealth/White Wealth: A New Perspective on Racial Inequality	
1996	Steven Epstein	Impure Science: AIDS, Activism, and the Politics of Knowledge	
1997	John L. Hagan and Bill McCarthy	Mean Streets: Youth Crime and Homelessness	
1998	Monica J. Casper	The Making of the Unborn Patient: A Social Anatomy of Fetal Surgery	
1999	Mitchell Duneier	Sidewalk	
2000	Michèle Lamont	The Dignity of Working Men: Morality and the Boundaries of Race, Class, and Immigration	
2001	Pierrette Hondagneu-Sotelo	Doméstica: Immigrant Workers Cleaning and Caring in the Shadows of Affluence	
2002	Co-Winner, Gordon Lafer	The Job Training Charade	
2002	Co-Winner, David Naguib Pellow	Garbage Wars: The Struggle for Environmental Justice in Chicago	
2003	Sharon Hays	Flat Broke With Children: Women in the Age of Welfare Reform	
2004	Mario Luis Small	Villa Victoria: The Transformation of Social Capital in a Boston Barrio	
2005	Pun Ngai	Made in China: Women Factory Workers in a Global Workplace	
2006	Sudhir Alladi Venkatesh	Off the Books: The Underground Economy of the Urban Poor	
2007	Daniel Jaffee	Brewing Justice: Fair Trade Coffee, Sustainability, and Survival	
2008	Martín Sánchez-Jankowski	Cracks in the Pavement: Social Change and Resilience in Poor Neighborhoods	
2009	Mario Luis Small	Unanticipated Gains: Origins of Network Inequality in Everyday Life	
2010	Mark Hunter	Love in the Time of AIDS: Inequality, Gender, and Rights in South Africa	
2011	Shamus Khan	Privilege: The Making of an Adolescent Elite at St. Paul's School	
2012	Cybelle Fox	Three Worlds of Relief: Race, Immigration, and the American Welfare State from the Progressive Era to the New Deal	
2013	Nancy DiTomaso	The American Non-Dilemma: Racial Inequality Without Racism	
2014	Laurence Ralph	Renegade Dreams: Living Through Injury in Gangland Chicago	
2015	Carla Shedd	Unequal City: Race, Schools, and Perceptions of Injustice	
2016	Roberto G. Gonzales	Lives in Limbo: Undocumented and Coming of Age in America	
2017	Claudia G. Cervantes-Soon	Juárez Girls Rising: Transformative Education in Times of Dystopia	
2018	Ranita Ray	The Making of a Teenage Service Class: Poverty and Mobility in an American City	
2019	Adia Harvey Wingfield	Flatlining: Race, Work, and Health Care in the New Economy	
2020	Danielle T. Raudenbush	Health Care Off the Books: Poverty, Illness, and Strategies for Survival in Urban America	
2021	Joseph C. Ewoodzie Jr.	Getting Something to Eat in Jackson: Race, Class, and Food in the American South	
2022	Michael L. Walker	Indefinite: Doing Time in Jail	
2023	Asad L. Asad	Engage and Evade: How Latino Immigrant Families Manage Surveillance in Everyday Life	
2024	Duana Fullwiley	Tabula Raza: Mapping Race and Human Diversity in American Genome Science	
2025	Christina J. Cross	Inherited Inequality: Why Opportunity Gaps Persist between Black and White Youth Raised in Two-Parent Families	

== See also ==
- List of social sciences awards
