= Ghetto =

Impoverished neighborhood inhabited by a certain group

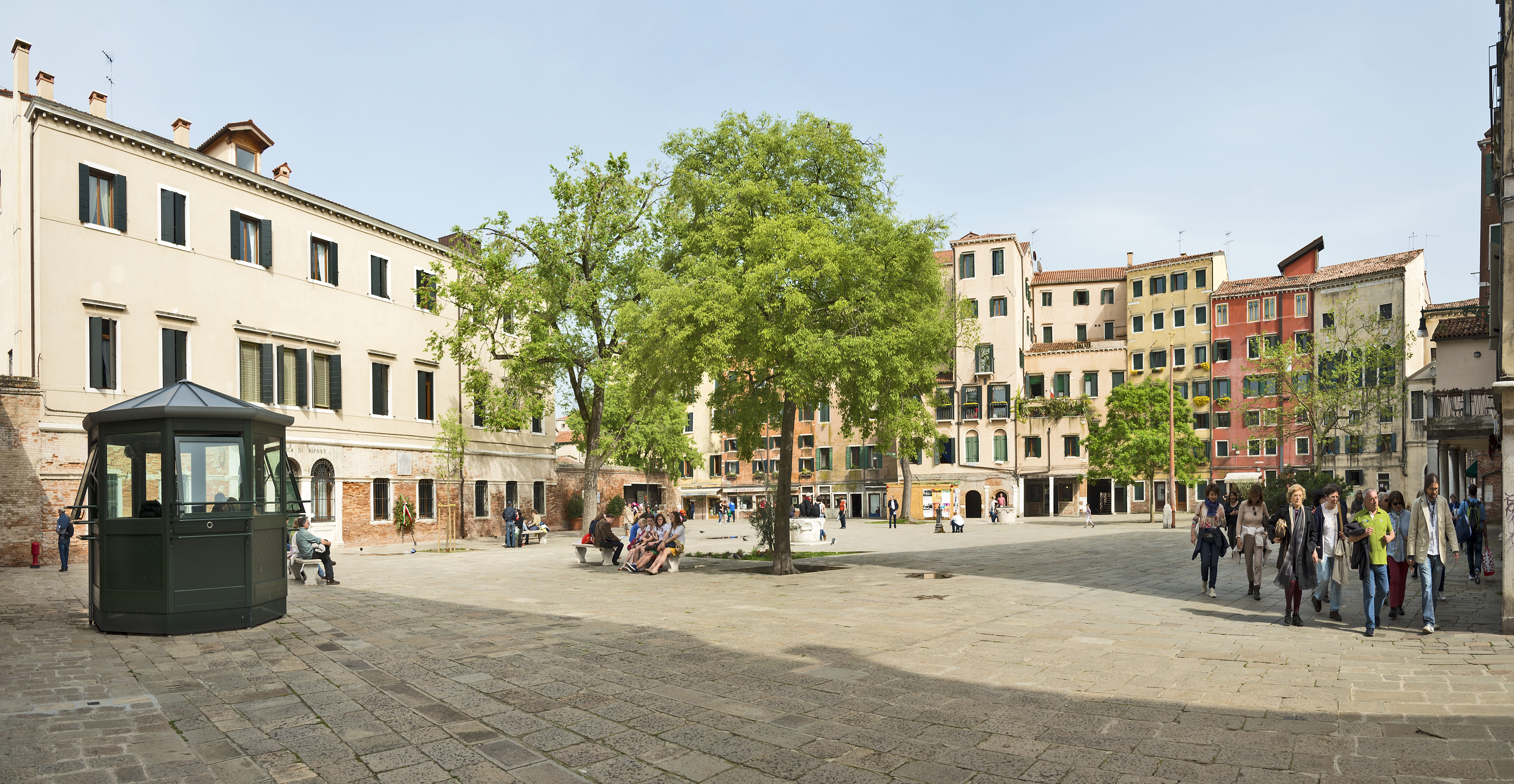
The main square of what was once the Venetian Ghetto in Italy (2013)

A ghetto is a part of a city where people of a particular race, religion and/or minority group live closely together and apart from other people, especially as a result of political, social, legal, religious, environmental, or economic pressure. Ghettos are often known for being more impoverished than other areas of the city. Versions of such restricted areas have been found across the world, each with their own names, classifications, and groupings of people.

The term was originally used for the Venetian Ghetto in Venice, Italy, as early as 1516, to describe the part of the city where Jewish people were restricted to live and thus segregated from other people. However, other early societies may have formed their own versions of the same structure; words resembling ghetto in meaning appear in Hebrew, Yiddish, Italian, Germanic, Polish, Corsican, Old French, and Latin. During the Holocaust, more than 1,000 Nazi ghettos were established to hold the Jewish populations of Europe, with the goal of exploiting and killing European Jews as part of the Final Solution of Nazi Germany.

The term ghetto acquired deep cultural meaning in the United States, especially in the context of segregation and civil rights. It has been widely used in the country since the 20th century to refer to poor neighborhoods of largely minority populations, especially African-American ones. It is also used in some European countries, such as Romania and Slovakia, to refer to poor neighborhoods largely inhabited by Romani people. The term slum is usually used to refer to areas in developing countries that suffer from absolute poverty, while the term ghetto is used to refer to areas of developed countries that suffer from relative poverty.

== Etymology and name ==
The word ghetto originates from the Venetian Ghetto, the Jewish quarter in Venice's Cannaregio district where Jews were legally confined following a 1516 decree. In the 16th century, Italian Jews, including those in Venice, commonly used the unrelated Hebrew term ḥāṣēr ('courtyard') to refer to a ghetto. By 1855, the term ghetto had been extended to refer to "any area occupied predominantly by a particular social or ethnic group, especially a densely populated urban area which is subject to social and economic pressures, tending to restrict its demographic profile."

The etymology of the Italian ghetto has long been debated among linguists, with no single theory achieving universal acceptance. Although often cited, the idea that it derives from the Hebrew gēṭ ('letter of divorce'; because the ghetto separated Jews from the rest of the population) is considered a folk etymology. Similarly, the Italian variant ghet, found in some Jewish notarial documents from the late 16th and early 17th centuries, seems to be a folk-etymological modification of ghetto, influenced by the Hebrew gēṭ.

Another commonly held hypothesis, mentioned by the Oxford English Dictionary, proposes that the term comes from an unattested Italian *gheto ('foundry'; cf. Italian getto 'the process of founding or casting metal'; 14th cent.), from post-classical Latin iectus or iactus (attested in a 1295 Venetian source referring to the locality), which could be compared to post-classical Latin ghetus or gettus (attested from 1306 in Venetian sources referring to the locality). However, linguist Anatoly Liberman argues that this explanation fails to account for the problematic phonetic change from Latin i- to Italian g- ~ gh-, and that there is no certainty that getto ever meant 'foundry' in the Venetian dialect. Alternatively, Liberman has suggested that in some Romance-speaking regions a slang borrowing from the Germanic gata ('street' or 'narrow street') may have existed in various forms, which eventually evolved into the Italian ghetto. Originally, the term may have carried a derogatory sense, referring to the impoverished quarters of exiled Venetian Jews. Over time, folk etymology further shaped its meaning, associating it with ideas like cannon foundries and separation.

Other suggestions, such as that the word is a shortening of Egitto ('Egypt') or borghetto ('small settlement'), or that it is related to the Old French guect ('guard'), are rejected by linguists as speculative and unconvincing. Additional proposals derive the term from ghectus (understood as the Latinized form of Yiddish gehektes 'enclosed') or from the Latin neuter Giudaicetum ('Jewish'), but they too lack sufficient phonetic support.

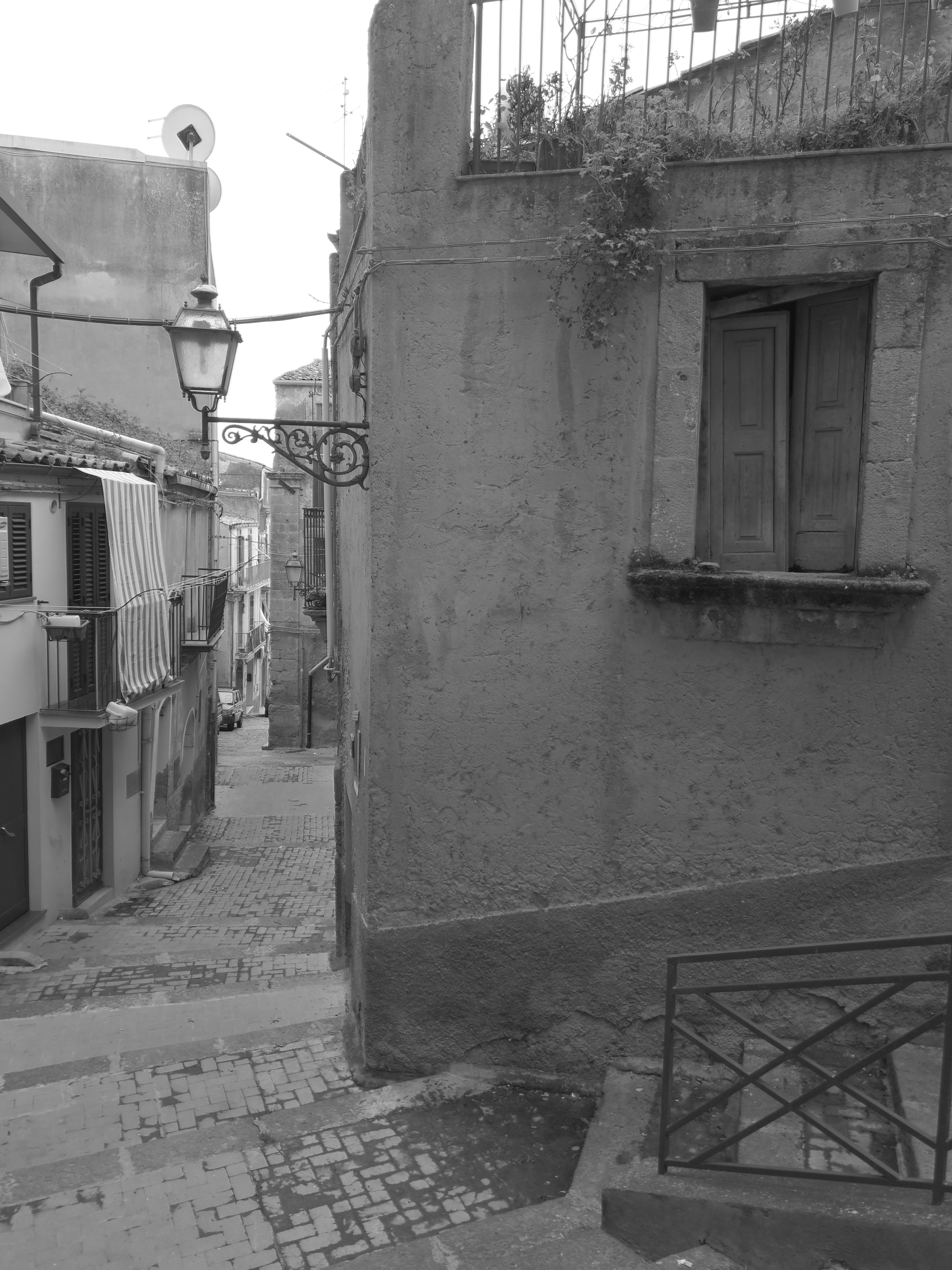
Jewish quarter of Caltagirone, Sicily

== Ghettos in Europe ==
=== Jewish ghettos ===
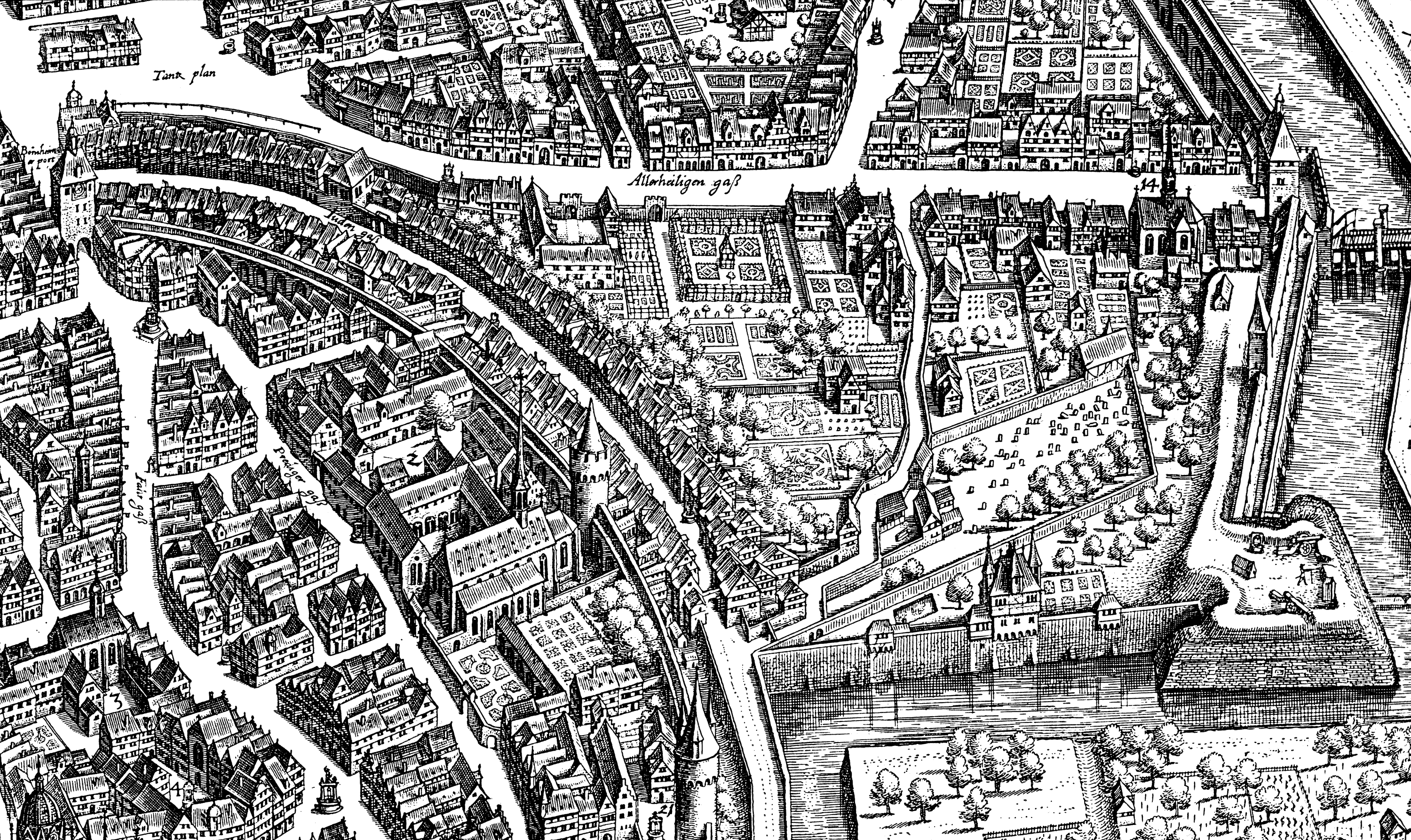
Plan of Jewish ghetto, Frankfurt, 1628

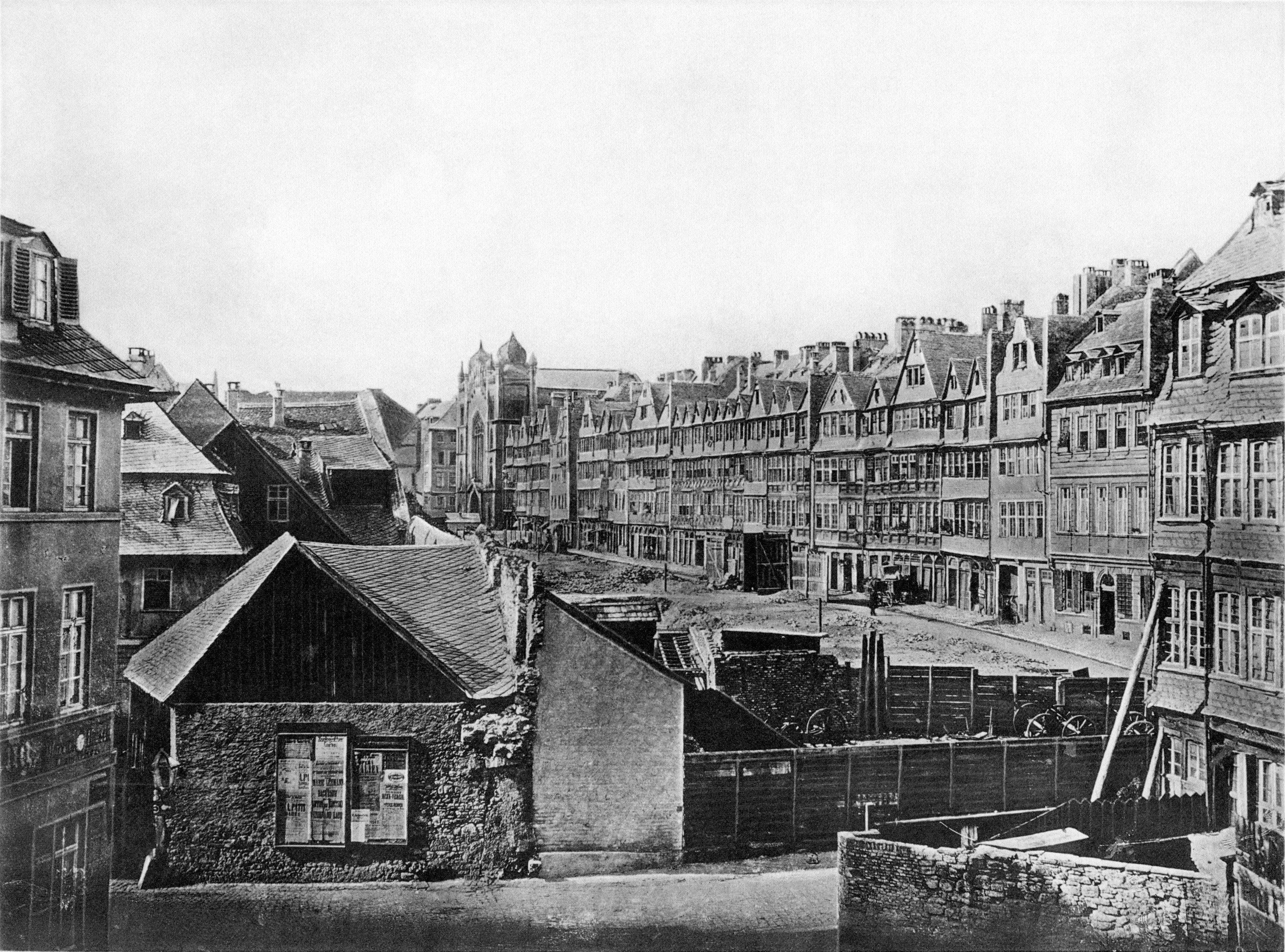
Demolition of the Jewish ghetto, Frankfurt, 1868

The character of ghettos has varied through times. The term was used for an area known as the Jewish quarter, which meant the area of a city traditionally inhabited by Jews in the diaspora. Jewish quarters, like the Jewish ghettos in Europe, were often the outgrowths of segregated ghettos instituted by the surrounding authorities. A Yiddish term for a Jewish quarter or neighborhood is Di yidishe gas (Yiddish: די ייִדישע גאַס), or 'The Jewish street'. Many European and Middle Eastern cities once had a historical Jewish quarter. Among the oldest and most noted are the so-called calls in Catalonia, specially those of Barcelona (Call jueu) and Girona.

Jewish ghettos in Christian Europe existed because of majority discrimination against Jews on the basis of religion, language and dated views on race: They were considered outsiders. As a result, Jews were placed under strict regulations throughout many European cities.

In some cases, the ghetto was a Jewish quarter with a relatively affluent population (for instance the Jewish ghetto in Venice). In other cases, ghettos were places of terrible poverty. During periods of population growth, ghettos (as that of Rome) had narrow streets and tall, crowded houses. Residents generally were allowed to administer their own justice system based on Jewish traditions and elders.

==== Nazi-occupied Europe ====
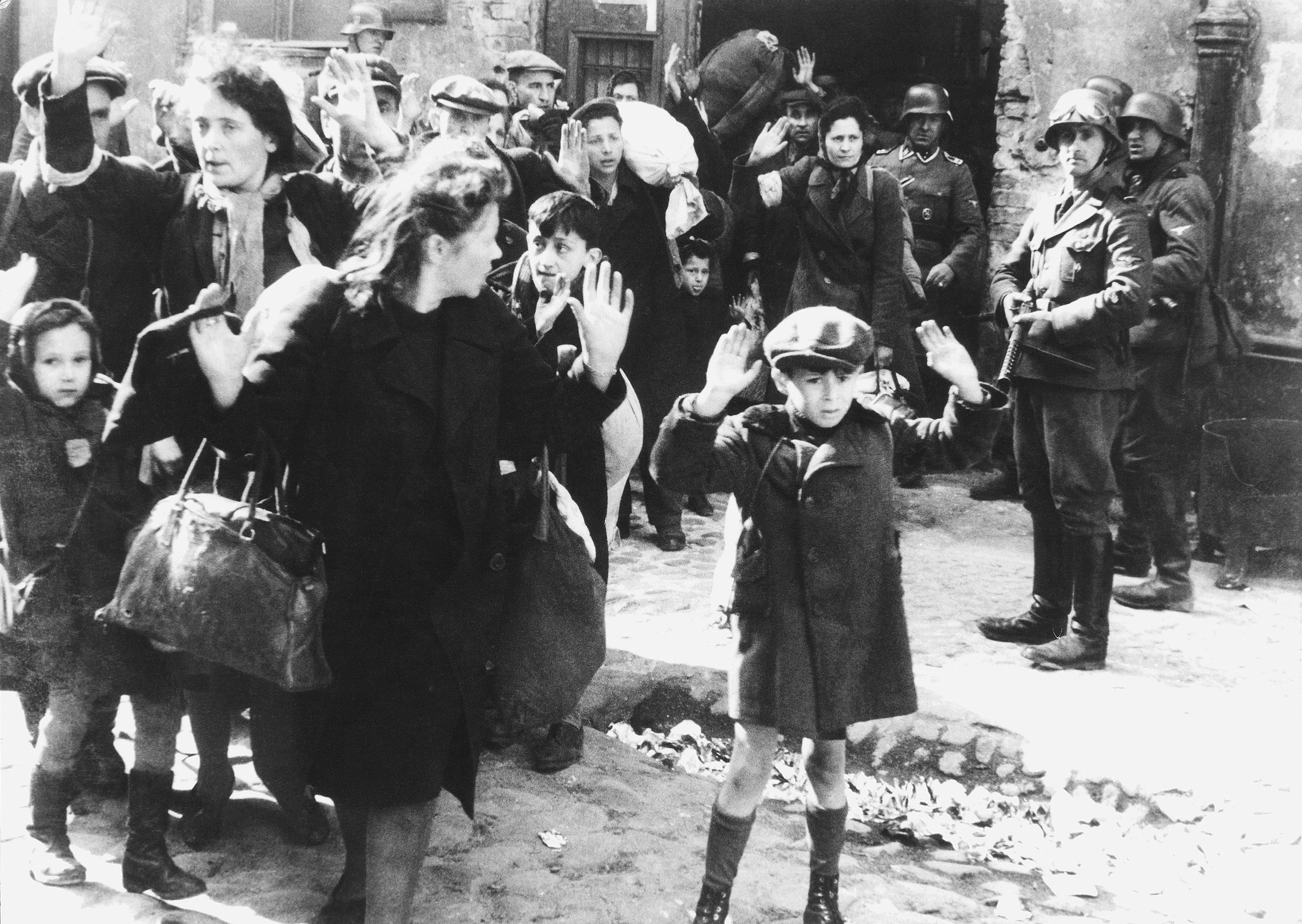
Liquidation of the Warsaw Ghetto, 1943

During World War II, the Nazis established new ghettos in numerous cities of Eastern Europe as a form of concentration camp to confine Jews and Romani into limited areas. The Nazis most often referred to these areas in documents and signage at their entrances as "Jewish quarter." These Nazi camps sometimes coincided with traditional Jewish ghettos and Jewish quarters, but not always. On June 21, 1943, Heinrich Himmler issued a decree ordering the dissolution of all Jüdische Wohnbezirke/ghettos in the East and their transference to Nazi concentration camps or their extermination.

The Nazi ghettos were an essentially different institution than the historical ghettos of European society. The historical ghettos were places where Jews lived for many generations and created their own culture – even if they were under social and political conditions of segregation and discrimination. The Nazi ghettos were part of The Final Solution; they were intended as a transitional stage – first confine each city's Jews in one easily accessible and controllable location, then "liquidate" the ghetto and send the Jews to an extermination camp. Most Nazi ghettos were liquidated in 1943; some, such as that of Łódź, persisted until 1944; very few, e.g. the Budapest Ghetto and the Theresienstadt Ghetto, existed until the end of the war in 1945.

=== Roma ghettos ===
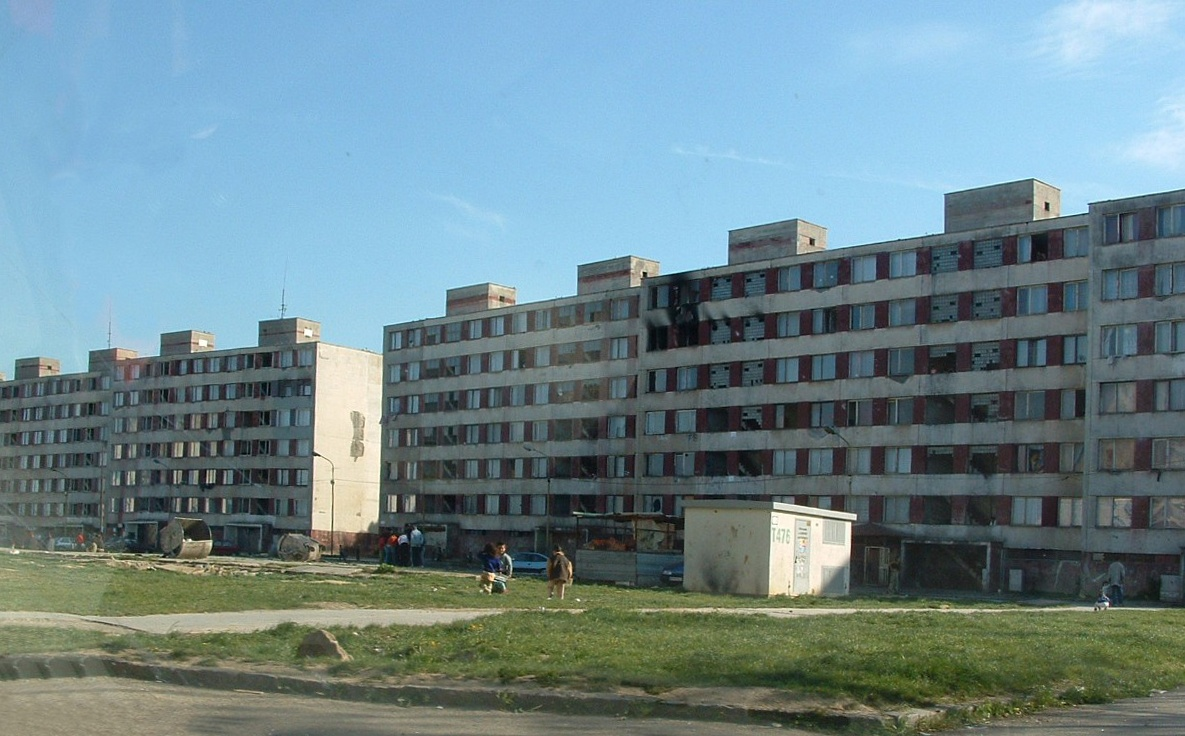
Roma settlement Luník IX near Košice, Slovakia

There are many Roma ghettos in the European Union. The Czech government estimates that there are approximately 830 Roma ghettos in the Czech Republic.

=== In Denmark ===
During the period 2010–2021, the word ghetto was used officially by the Danish government to describe certain officially designated vulnerable social housing areas in the country. The designation was applied to areas based on the residents' income levels, employment status, education levels, criminal convictions and proportion of non-Western immigrants and their descendants. The term was controversial during its period of use and was finally removed in 2021.

In 2010, the Danish Ministry of Transport, Building and Housing introduced an official listing of vulnerable social housing districts where the inhabitants fulfilled certain criteria. The list has informally and at times formally been called Ghettolisten (the 'List of Ghettos'). Since 2010, the list has been updated annually, with changes in the definition and/or terminology in 2013, 2018 and 2021.

In 2018, the Danish government at the time, led by Prime Minister Lars Løkke Rasmussen, announced its intention to "end the existence of parallel societies and ghettos by 2030." A number of measures was introduced to solve the issue of integration, including policies like 25 hours of obligatory daycare or corresponding parent supervision per week for children in the appointed areas starting age 1, lowering social welfare for residents, incentives for reducing unemployment, demolition and rebuilding of certain tenements, rights for landlords to refuse housing to convicts, etc. The policies have been criticized for undercutting 'equality before law' and for portraying immigrants, especially Muslim immigrants, in a bad light.

The term "ghetto" was controversial during the period of its usage, inhabitants feeling stigmatized by the wording and researchers pointing out that the areas in question were typically inhabited by 20-40 different ethnic minorities, hence being diametrically opposed to the ethnic homogeneity of the original ghettos, so that multi-ethnic residential areas would be a more appropriate term.

In June 2019 a new social democratic government was formed in Denmark, with Kaare Dybvad becoming housing minister. He stated that the new government would stop using the word "ghetto" for vulnerable housing areas, as it was both imprecise and derogatory. In a 2021 reform, the name was finally removed in legal texts by Parliament. Instead, a new category called "parallel societies" was instituted.

=== In France ===
In France, a banlieue (French: [bɑ̃ljø]) is a suburb of a large city. Banlieues are divided into autonomous administrative entities and do not constitute part of the city proper. For instance, 80% of the inhabitants of the Paris area live outside the city of Paris. Like the city centre, suburbs may be rich, middle-class or poor — Versailles, Le Vésinet, Maisons-Laffitte and Neuilly-sur-Seine are affluent banlieues of Paris, while Clichy-sous-Bois, Bondy and Corbeil-Essonnes are less so. However, since the 1970s, banlieues increasingly means, in French of France, low-income housing projects (HLMs) in which mainly foreign immigrants and French of foreign descent reside, often in perceived poverty traps.

=== In the United Kingdom ===
The existence of ethnic enclaves in the United Kingdom is controversial. Southall Broadway, a predominantly Asian area in Greater London, where less than 12 percent of the population is white, has been cited as an example of a 'ghetto', but in reality the area is home to a number of different ethnic groups and religious groups.

Analysis of data from Census 2001 revealed that only two wards in England and Wales, both in Birmingham, had one dominant non-white ethnic group comprising more than two-thirds of the local population, but there were 20 wards where whites were a minority making up less than a third of the local population. By 2001, two London boroughs—Newham and Brent—had "minority majority" populations, and most parts of the city tend to have a diverse population.

Historically, some parts of London have long been noted for the prevalence of a particular ethnic or religious group (such as the Jewish communities of Golders Green and other parts of the London Borough of Barnet, and the West Indian community of Notting Hill), but in each case these populations have been part of a broader multicultural population. In the late 19th and early 20th century, the East End of London was also noted for its Huguenot and Jewish population, but now has a significant British Bangladeshi populace.

==== In Northern Ireland ====
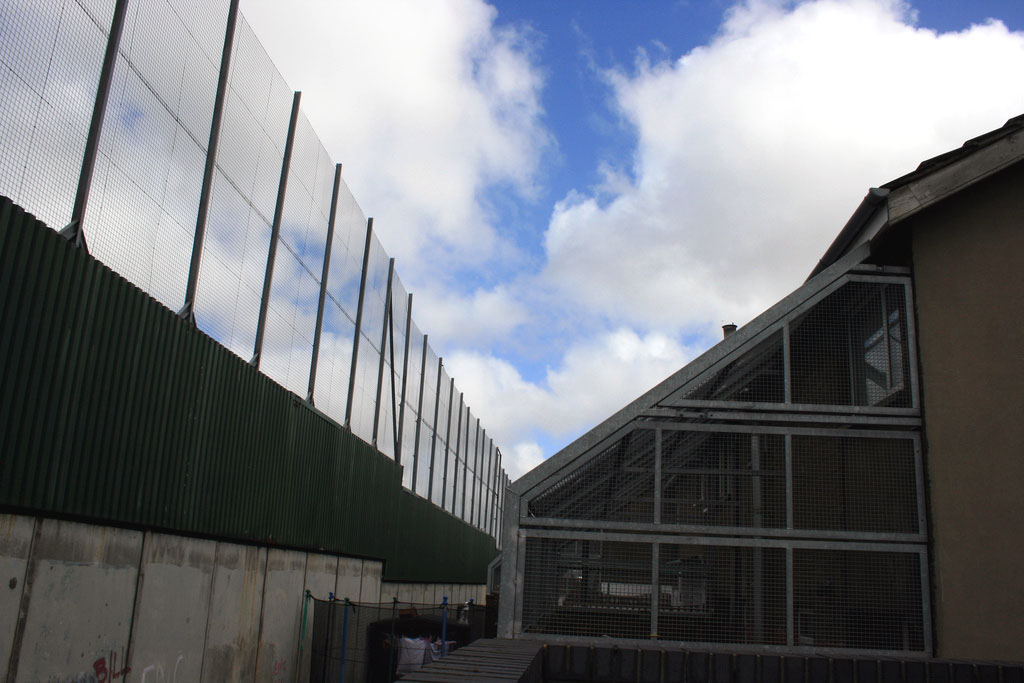
A "peace line" in Belfast, seen from the Irish nationalist/republican side. The small back row of houses are protected by cages as missiles are sometimes thrown from the other side.

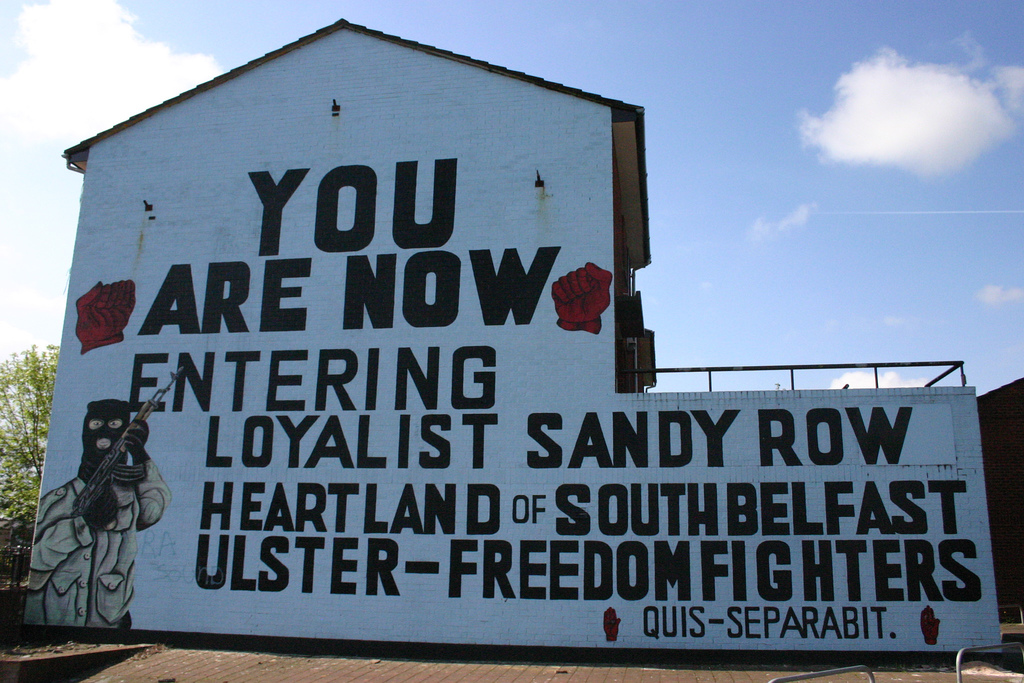
Mural at the edge of a loyalist ghetto in Belfast

In Northern Ireland, towns and cities have long been segregated along ethnic, religious and political lines. The two main communities of Northern Ireland are:

1. the Irish nationalist-republican community, who mainly self-identify as Irish or Catholic; and
2. the unionist-loyalist community, who mainly self-identify as British or Protestant.

Ghettos emerged in Belfast during the riots that accompanied the Irish War of Independence. For safety, people fled to areas where their community was the majority. Many more ghettos emerged after the 1969 riots and beginning of the "Troubles." In August 1969 the British Army was deployed to restore order and separate the two sides. The government built barriers called "peace lines." Many of the ghettos came under the control of paramilitaries such as the (republican) Provisional Irish Republican Army and the (loyalist) Ulster Defence Association. One of the most notable ghettos was Free Derry.

== Ghettos in the United States ==
=== Early ghettos ===
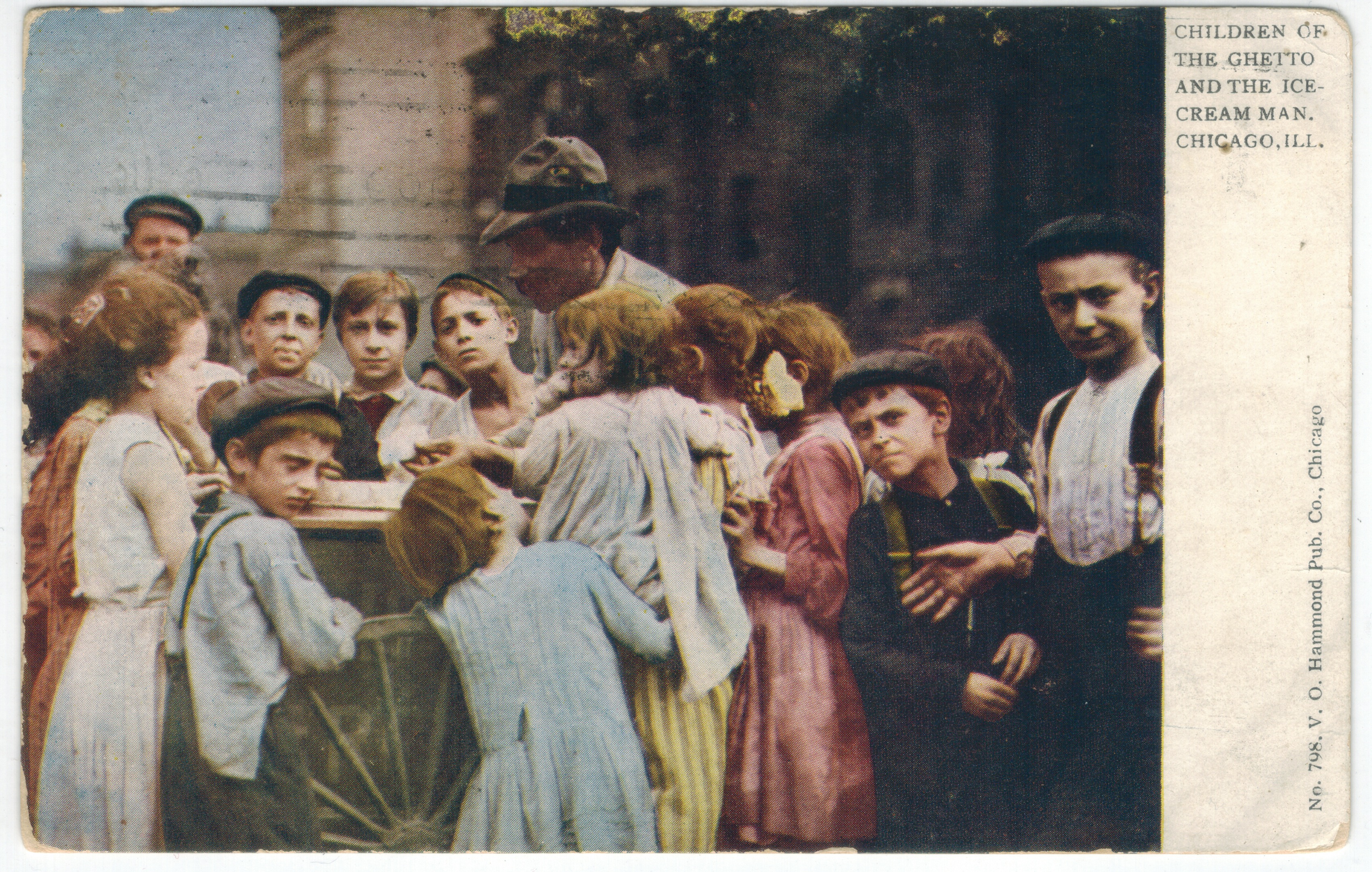
Children in the Ghetto and the Ice-Cream Man — postcard from 1909 in Maxwell Street, Chicago

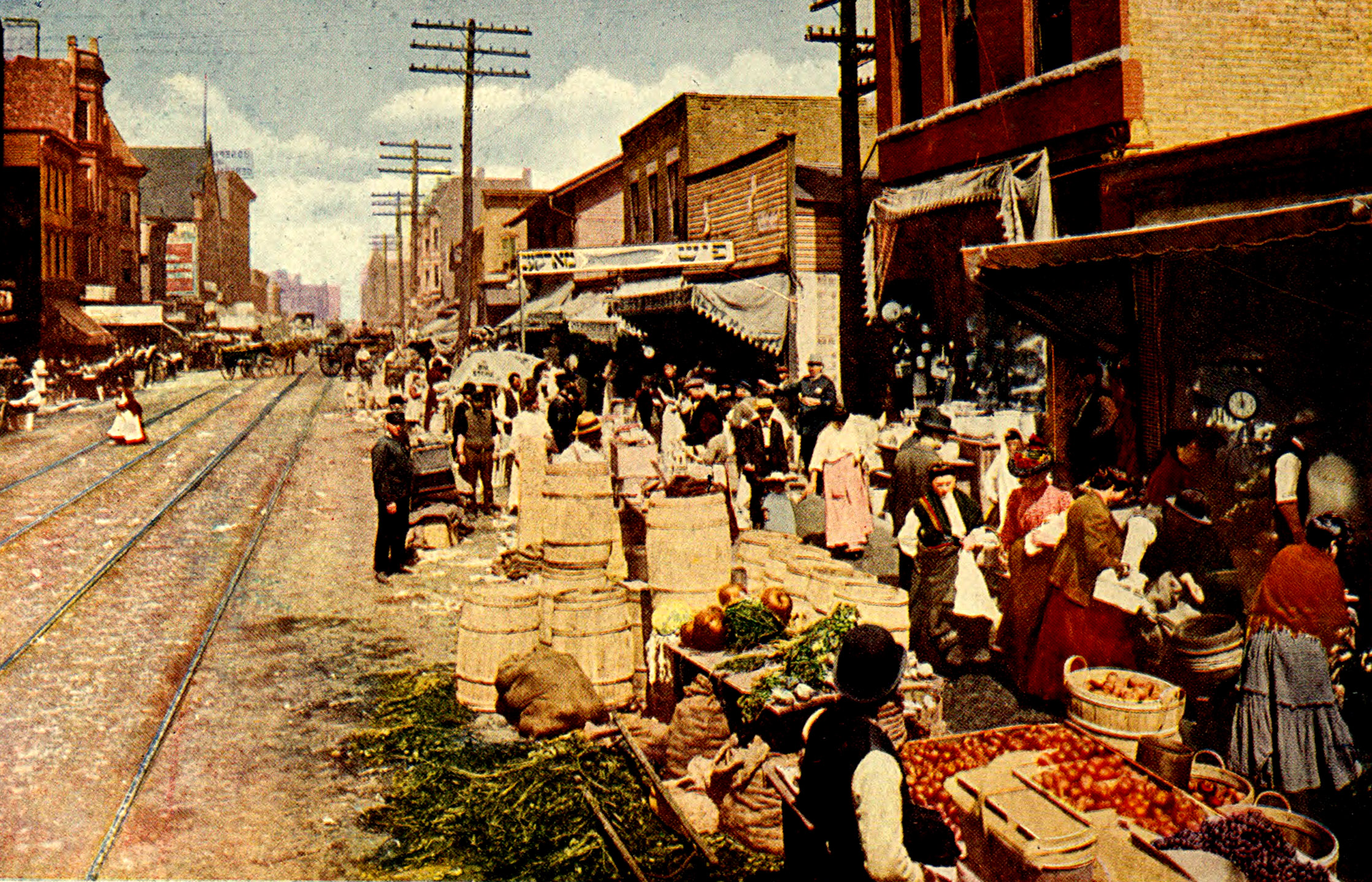
A scene of Maxwell Street in Chicago circa 1908. The title reads "THE GHETTO OF CHICAGO". The image has been colorized and is taken from a souvenir guide to Chicago printed in 1908. Note the signage in Yiddish that reads 'Fish Market'.

The development of ghettos in the United States is closely associated with different waves of immigration and internal urban migration. The Irish and German immigrants of the mid-19th century were the first ethnic groups to form ethnic enclaves in United States cities. This was followed by large numbers of immigrants from Southern and Eastern Europe, including many Italians and Poles and Russians between 1880 and 1920. Jewish immigrants were part of the earliest German wave, as well as comprising numerous immigrants from Eastern Europe, the Russian Empire at the time. Most remained in their established immigrant communities, but by the second or third generation, many families were able to relocate to newer housing built in the suburbs after World War II.

These ethnic ghetto areas included the Lower East Side in Manhattan, New York, which later became notable as predominantly Jewish, and later still as Chinese and Latino. East Harlem was once predominantly Italian and in the 1950s became home to a large Puerto Rican community. Many Little Italys across the country are predominantly Italian ghettos. Polish immigrants settled in areas of other nationals, such as Polish Downtown of Chicago and Polish Hill of Pittsburgh. Andersonville in Chicago is a famous Swedish ghetto. Since the late 20th century, Brighton Beach in Brooklyn has become the home of predominately Russian and Ukrainian immigrants, who left after the Soviet Union lifted some migration restrictions and later after its fall.

=== Black or African-American ghettos ===
A commonly used definition of a ghetto is a community distinguished by a homogeneous race or ethnicity. Additionally, a key feature that developed throughout the post-industrial era and continues to symbolize the demographics of American ghettos is the prevalence of poverty. Poverty constitutes the separation of ghettos from other, suburbanized or private neighborhoods. The high percentage of poverty partly justifies the difficulty of emigration, which tends to reproduce constraining social opportunities and inequalities in society.

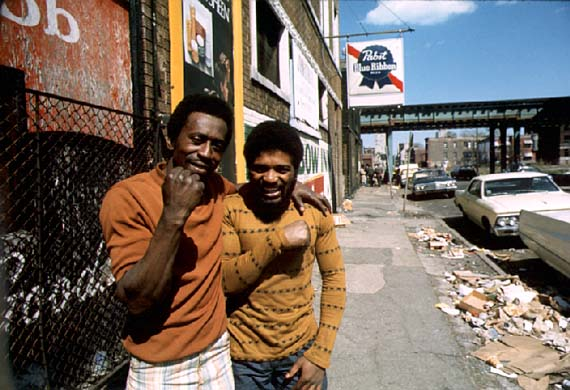
Chicago ghetto on the South Side, May 1974

The term ghettos has been commonly used for some time, but ghettos were around long before the term was coined. Urban areas in the U.S. can often be classified as "black" or "white", with the inhabitants primarily belonging to a homogenous racial grouping. This classification can be traced back as early as the year 1880 as African Americans were living in their own neighborhoods. Sixty years after the American civil rights movement of the 1950s and 1960s, most of the United States remains a residentially segregated society in which black people and white people inhabit different neighborhoods of significantly different quality.

Many of these neighborhoods are located in Northern and Western cities where African Americans moved during the Great Migration (1914–1970), a period when over a million African-Americans moved out of the rural southern United States to escape the widespread racism of the South; to seek out employment opportunities in industrial cities; and to pursue what was widely perceived to be a better quality of life in the North and West, such as New York City, Detroit, Cleveland, Chicago, Pittsburgh, Los Angeles, Oakland, Portland, and Seattle. African Americans found they had to struggle with white ethnic groups in Northern and Midwestern cities; many of them more recent European immigrants. Often they were restricted to areas of older and poor housing in the new cities where they settled.

The social disruption and economic competition following World War I, as veterans returned to the US, resulted in an outbreak of racial violence of whites against blacks in many of these Northern cities, such as Chicago, Omaha; Washington, DC, and others. Southern industrial cities were also affected. Such racist attacks were extremely violent, in some cases they included burning or bombing homes of African Americans; many innocent blacks were killed. African-American leaders described 1919 as the Red Summer because of the widespread racial outbreaks and white attacks on mainly African Americans.

Two main factors ensured further separation between races and classes, and ultimately the development of contemporary ghettos: the relocation of industrial enterprises, and the movement of middle to upper class residents into suburban neighborhoods. Between 1967 and 1987, economic restructuring resulted in a dramatic decline of manufacturing jobs, which had formerly provided good livings for unionized, working-class blacks and whites. The once thriving northern and western industrial cities survived by a gradual shift to service and financial occupations. Subsidized highways and suburban development in the postwar period had pulled many middle and upper-class families and related businesses to the suburbs. Those who could not afford to move were left with disrupted neighborhoods and economies in the inner cities. African Americans were disproportionately affected and became either unemployed or underemployed, with little wage and reduced benefits. A concentration of African Americans predominated in some inner city neighborhoods.

It is also significant to compare the demographic patterns between black people and European immigrants, according to the labor market. European immigrants and African Americans were both subject to an ethnic division of labor. Because of discrimination, African Americans were often restricted to the least secure division of the labor market. David Ward refers to this stagnant position in African-American or Black ghettos as the 'elevator' model, which implies that each group of immigrants or migrants takes turns in the processes of social mobility and suburbanization; and several groups did not start on the ground floor. The inability of black people to move from the ground floor, as Ward suggests, is dependent upon prejudice and segregationist patterns established in the South prior to World War I, where most African Americans were disenfranchised by the turn of the century and deprived of political power.

After the exodus of African Americans to the North during and after World War I, they had to compete with numerous European immigrants; thus, African-Americans were diminished to unskilled jobs. The slow rate of advancement in black communities outlines the rigidity of the labor market, competition and conflict, adding another dimension to the prevalence of poverty and social instability in African-American or Black ghettos.

==== Effect of World War II on development ====
In the years following World War II, many white Americans began to move away from inner cities to newer suburban communities, a process known as white flight. White flight occurred, in part, as a response to black people moving into white urban neighborhoods. Discriminatory practices, especially those intended to "preserve" emerging white suburbs, restricted the ability of black people to move from inner cities to the suburbs, even when they were economically able to afford it. In contrast to this, the same period in history marked a massive suburban expansion available primarily to whites of both wealthy and working-class backgrounds, facilitated through highway construction and the availability of federally subsidized home mortgages (VA, FHA, Home Owners' Loan Corporation). These made it easier for families to buy new houses in the suburbs, but not to rent apartments in cities.

The United States began restructuring its economy after World War II, fueled by new globalizing processes, and demonstrated through technological advances and improvements in efficiency. The structural shift of 1973, during the post-Fordist era, became a large component to the racial ghetto and its relationship with the labor market. Sharon Zukin declares the designated stratum of African-Americans in the labor force was placed even below the working class; low-skill urban jobs were now given to incoming immigrants from Mexico or the Caribbean. Additionally, Zukin notes, "Not only have social services been drastically reduced, punitive and other social controls over the poor have been increased," such as law enforcement and imprisonment. Described as the "urban crisis" during the 1970s and 1980s, the transition stressed regional divisions according to differences in income and racial lines—white "donuts" around black holes. Hardly coincidental, the steady separation occurred during the period of civil rights laws, urban riots and Black Power. In addition, the International Encyclopedia of Social Sciences stresses the various challenges developed by this "urban crisis", including:

[P]oorly underserviced infrastructures, inadequate housing to accommodate a growing urban populace, group conflict and competition over limited jobs and space, the inability for many residents to compete for new technology-based jobs, and tensions between the public and private sectors left to the formation and growth of U.S. ghettos.

The cumulative economic and social forces in ghettos give way to social, political and economic isolation and inequality, while indirectly defining a separation between superior and inferior status of groups.

In response to the influx of black people from the South, banks, insurance companies, and businesses began denying or increasing the cost of services, such as banking, insurance, access to jobs, access to health care, or even supermarkets to residents in certain, often racially determined, areas. The most devastating form of redlining, and the most common use of the term, refers to mortgage discrimination. Data on house prices and attitudes toward integration suggest that in the mid-twentieth century, segregation was a product of collective actions taken by non-black people to exclude black people from outside neighborhoods.

The "Racial" Provisions of the FHA Underwriting Manual of 1936 included the following guidelines which exacerbated the segregation issue:

Recommended restrictions should include provision for: prohibition of the occupancy of properties except by the race for which they are intended ... Schools should be appropriate to the needs of the new community and they should not be attended in large numbers by inharmonious racial groups.

This meant that ethnic minorities could secure mortgage loans only in certain areas, and it resulted in a large increase in the residential racial segregation and urban decay in the United States. The creation of new highways in some cases divided and isolated black neighborhoods from goods and services, many times within industrial corridors. For example, Birmingham, Alabama's interstate highway system attempted to maintain the racial boundaries that had been established by the city's 1926 racial zoning law. The construction of interstate highways through black neighborhoods in the city led to significant population loss in those neighborhoods and is associated with an increase in neighborhood racial segregation. Residential segregation was further perpetuated because whites were willing to pay more than black people to live in predominantly white areas. Some social scientists suggest that the historical processes of suburbanization and decentralization are instances of white privilege that have contributed to contemporary patterns of environmental racism.

Following the emergence of anti-discrimination policies in housing and labor sparked by the civil rights movement, members of the black middle class moved out of the ghetto. The Fair Housing Act was passed in 1968. This was the first federal law that outlawed discrimination in the sale and rental of housing on the basis of race, color, national origin, religion and later sex, familial status, and disability. The Office of Fair Housing and Equal Opportunity was charged with administering and enforcing the law. Since housing discrimination became illegal, new housing opportunities were made available to the black community and many left the ghetto. Urban sociologists frequently title this historical event as "black middle class exodus", or black flight. Elijah Anderson describes a process by which members of the black middle class begin to distance themselves socially and culturally from ghetto residents during the later half of the twentieth century, "eventually expressing this distance by literally moving away." This is followed by the exodus of black working-class families. As a result, the ghetto becomes primarily occupied by what sociologists and journalists of the 1980s and 1990s frequently title the "underclass." William Julius Wilson suggests this exodus worsened the isolation of the black underclass — not only were they socially and physically distanced from whites, they also became isolated from the black middle class.

==== Theories on the development of Black ghettos ====
Two dominant theories arise pertaining to the production and development of U.S. ghettos: race-based and class-based; as well as an alternative theory put forward by Thomas Sowell.

===== Race-based theories =====
First are the race-based theorists, who argue the importance of race in ghettos. Their analysis consists of the dominant racial group in the U.S. (White Anglo-Saxon Protestants) and their use of certain racist tactics in order to maintain their hegemony over black people and lengthen their spatial separation. Race-based theorists offset other arguments that focus on the influence of the economy on segregation. More contemporary research of race-based theorists is to frame a range of methods conducted by white Americans to "preserve race-based residential inequities" as a function of the dominantly white, state-run government. Involving uneven development, mortgage and business discrimination and disinvestment—U.S. ghettos then, as suggested by race-based theorists, are conserved by distinctly racial reasoning.

===== Class-based theories =====
The more dominant view, on the other hand, is represented by class-based theorists. Such theories confirm class to be more important than race in the structuring of U.S. ghettos. Although racial concentration is a key signifier for ghettos, class-based theorists emphasize the role and impact of broader societal structures in the creation of African-American or Black ghettos. Dynamics of low-wage service and unemployment triggered from deindustrialization, and the intergenerational diffusion of status within families and neighborhoods, for instance, prove the rise in socioeconomic polarization between classes to be the creator of American ghetto; not racism. Furthermore, the culture of poverty theory, first developed by Oscar Lewis, states that a prolonged history of poverty can itself become a cultural obstacle to socioeconomic success, and in turn can continue a pattern of socioeconomic polarization. Ghettos, in short, instill a cultural adaptation to social and class-based inequalities, reducing the ability of future generations to mobilize or migrate.

===== Alternative theory =====
An alternative theory put forward by Thomas Sowell in Black Rednecks and White Liberals asserts that modern urban black ghetto culture is rooted in the white Cracker culture of the North Britons and Scots-Irish who migrated from the generally lawless border regions of Britain to the American South, where they formed a redneck culture common to both black and white people in the antebellum South. Characteristics of this culture included lively music and dance, violence, unbridled emotions, flamboyant imagery, illegitimacy, religious oratory marked by strident rhetoric, and a lack of emphasis on education and intellectual interests. Because redneck culture proved counterproductive, "that culture long ago died out...among both white and black Southerners, while still surviving today in the poorest and worst of the urban black ghettos", which Sowell described as being characterized by "brawling, braggadocio, self-indulgence, [and] disregard of the future", and where "belligerence is considered being manly and crudity is considered cool, while being civilized is regarded as 'acting white'." Sowell blames liberal Americans who since the 1960s have embraced black ghetto culture as the only "'authentic' black culture and even glamorize it" while they "denounce any criticism of the ghetto lifestyle or any attempt to change it." Sowell asserts that white liberal Americans have perpetuated this "counterproductive and self-destructive lifestyle" among black Americans living in urban ghettos through "the welfare state, and look-the-other-way policing, and smiling at 'gangsta rap'."

==== U.S. characterizations of "ghetto" ====
Contemporary African-American or Black ghettos are characterized by an overrepresentation of a particular ethnicity or race, vulnerability to crime, social problems, governmental reliance and political disempowerment. Sharon Zukin explains that through these reasons, society rationalizes the term "bad neighborhoods." Zukin stresses that these circumstances are largely related to "racial concentration, residential abandonment, and de-constitution and reconstitution of communal institutions." Many scholars diagnose this poorly facilitated and fragmented view of the United States as the "age of extremes." This term argues that inequalities of wealth and power reinforce spatial separation; for example, the growth of gated communities can be interconnected with the continued "ghettoization" of the poor.

Another characteristic to African-American or Black ghettos and spatial separation is the dependence on the state, and lack of communal autonomy; Sharon Zukin refers to Brownsville, Brooklyn, as an example. This relationship between racial ghettos and the state is demonstrated through various push and pull features, implemented through government subsidized investments, which certainly assisted the movement of white Americans into the suburbs after World War II. Since the 1960s, after the de-constitution of the inner cities, African-American or Black ghettos have attempted to reorganize or reconstitute; in effect, they are increasingly regarded as public- and state-dependent communities. Brownsville, for instance, initiated the constitution of community-established public housing, anti-poverty organizations, and social service facilities—all, in their own way, depend on state resources. However, certain dependence contradicts society's desires to be autonomous actors in the market. Moreover, Zukin implies, "the less 'autonomous' the community—in its dependence on public schools, public housing and various subsidy programs—the greater the inequity between their organizations and the state, and the less willing residents are to organize." This should not, however, undermine local development corporations or social service agencies helping these neighborhoods. The lack of autonomy and growing dependence on the state, especially in a neoliberal economy, remains a key indicator to the production as well as the prevalence of African-American or Black ghettos, particularly due to the lack of opportunities to compete in the global market.

The concept of the ghetto and underclass has faced criticism both theoretically and empirically. Research has shown significant differences in resources for neighborhoods with similar populations both across cities and over time. This includes differences in the resources of neighborhoods with predominantly low income or racial minority populations. The cause of these differences in resources across similar neighborhoods has more to do with dynamics outside of the neighborhood. To a large extent the problem with the ghetto and underclass concepts stem from the reliance on case studies (in particular case studies from Chicago), which limit social scientist understandings of socially disadvantaged neighborhoods.

===== Internal characterizations =====
Despite mainstream America's use of the term ghetto to signify a poor, culturally or racially homogenous urban area, those living in the area often used it to signify something positive. The black ghettos did not always contain dilapidated houses and deteriorating projects, nor were all of its residents poverty-stricken. For many African-Americans, the ghetto was "home": a place representing authentic blackness and a feeling, passion, or emotion derived from rising above the struggle and suffering of being black in America.

Langston Hughes relays in his "Negro Ghetto" (1931) and "The Heart of Harlem" (1945) poems:

The buildings in Harlem are brick and stone
And the streets are long and wide,
But Harlem's much more than these alone,
Harlem is what's inside.

— "The Heart of Harlem" (1945)

Playwright August Wilson uses the term "ghetto" in Ma Rainey's Black Bottom (1984) and Fences (1985), both of which draw upon the author's experience growing up in the Hill District of Pittsburgh, a black ghetto.

==== Modern usage and reinterpretations of "ghetto" ====
Recently the word "ghetto" has been used in slang as an adjective rather than a noun. It is used to indicate an object's relation to the inner city and also more broadly to denote something that is shabby or of low quality. While "ghetto" as an adjective can be used derogatorily, the African-American or Black community, particularly the hip hop scene, has taken the word for themselves and begun using it in a more positive sense that transcends its derogatory origins.

In 1973, Geographical Review claimed "The degree of residential segregation of the black community is greater than for any other group in urban America, yet black people have not had the political power necessary to exercise any significant degree of control over the improvement of the basic services necessary for their health, education, and welfare." Scholars have been interested in the study of African-American or Black ghettos precisely for the concentration of disadvantaged residents and their vulnerability to social problems. American ghettos also bring attention to geographical and political barriers, and as Doreen Massey highlights, that racial segregation in African-American or Black ghettos challenge America's democratic foundations. However, it is still advocated that "One solution to these problems depends on our ability to use the political process in eliminating the inequities... geographical knowledge and theory to public-policy decisions about poor people and poor regions is a professional obligation."

== Ghettos elsewhere ==
=== Shanghai ghetto ===
Before and during World War II, many Jews fled from German-occupied Europe to Shanghai. After Japan invaded China, it established the Shanghai Ghetto, an area of approximately one square mile (≈ 2.6 km^{2}) in the Hongkou District of the Empire of Japan, to which it relocated about 20,000 Jewish refugees under its Proclamation Concerning Restriction of Residence and Business of Stateless Refugees.

== In popular culture ==
A number of songs and films have been written about/depicting the ghetto.

=== Film ===
- The Wall (1982), a TV Movie about the Warsaw ghetto uprising
- Boyz n the Hood (1991), a film about three young males living in Los Angeles' Crenshaw ghetto
- Menace II Society (1993), about a young street hustler who attempts to escape the ghetto in a quest for a better life
- Uprising (2001), a TV Movie in which Jews rise up in the Warsaw Ghetto against the Nazis in 1943.
- The Courageous Heart of Irena Sendler (2009), a TV movie about the titular Irena Sendler who saved the lives of hundreds of Jewish children by smuggling them out of the Warsaw ghetto in Poland
- Who Will Write Our History (2018), a film about Emanuel Ringelblum, and the secret archive that he created and led in the Warsaw Ghetto

=== Music ===
- "In the Ghetto" (originally titled "The Vicious Circle"), a 1969 song about birth and life in slum areas, written by Mac Davis and made famous by Elvis Presley
- "The Ghetto" (1970), soul song by Donny Hathaway
- "Ghetto Life " (1981), funk song by Rick James
- "The Ghetto" (1990), hip-hop song written by Too Short
- "Ghetto" (2001), a song by P.O.D. from Satellite
- "Ghetto" (2004) by Akon
- "Ghetto" (2007), R&B song written by American singer Kelly Rowland
- "Ghetto" (2011), a song by Junai Kaden featuring Mumzy Stranger from From Me to You.
- "Ghetto" (2014), an R&B song by August Alsina

== See also ==
- Balkanization
- Bantustan
- Blockbusting
- China town
- Gated community
- Ghetto fabulous
- Ghetto tax
- Indian reservation
- Islam in Europe
- Jewish quarter
- Poverty map
- Rural ghetto
- Shanty town
- Skid row
- Slum
- Township (South Africa)
- Trailer park
- Urbanization
- Urban vitality
