= Liebow =

Liebow is a surname. Notable people with the surname include:

- Averill A. Liebow (1911–1978), American pathologist
- Elliot Liebow (1925–1994), American anthropologist
