= Adolphe Quetelet =

Belgian astronomer, mathematician, and sociologist (1796–1874)

Adolphe Quetelet ForMemRS
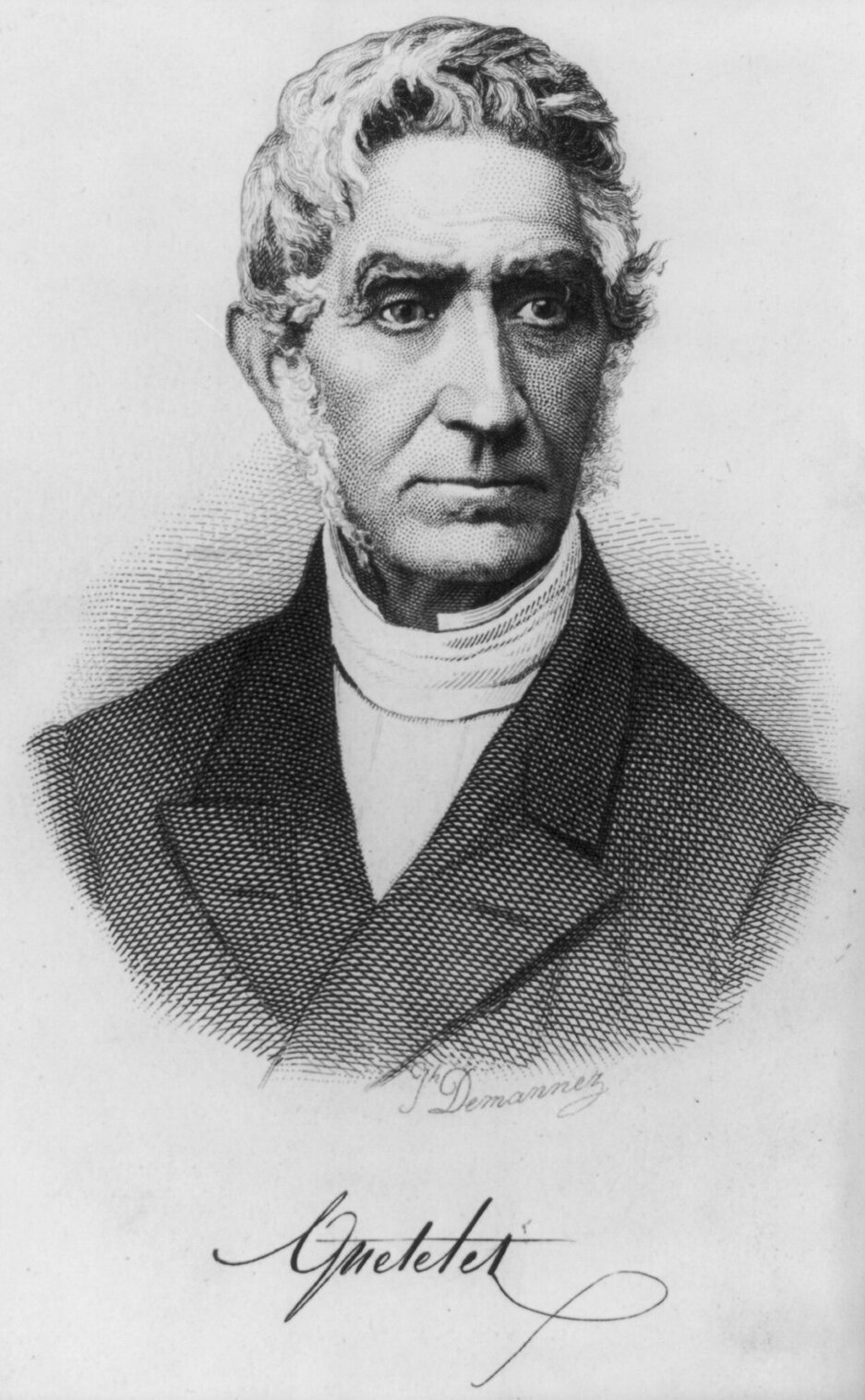
- Born: Lambert Adolphe Jacques Quetelet; 22 February 1796; Ghent, French Republic (now Ghent, Belgium)
- Died: 17 February 1874 (aged 77); Brussels, Belgium
- Education: University of Ghent
- Known for: Contributions to social physics
- Scientific career
- Fields: Astronomy; mathematics; statistics; sociology
- Workplaces: Brussels Observatory

Lambert Adolphe Jacques Quetelet (French: [kətlɛ]; 22 February 1796 – 17 February 1874) was a Belgian astronomer, mathematician, statistician, and sociologist who founded and directed the Brussels Observatory and was influential in introducing statistical methods to the social sciences. His name is sometimes spelled with an accent as Quételet.

He also founded the science of anthropometry and developed the body mass index (BMI) scale, originally called the Quetelet Index. His work on measuring human characteristic to determine the ideal l'homme moyen ("the average man") played a key role in the origins of eugenics.

== Life ==
Adolphe was born in Ghent (which, at the time, was part of the new French Republic). He was the son of François-Augustin-Jacques-Henri Quetelet, a Frenchman, and Anne Françoise Vandervelde, a Flemish woman. His father was born at Ham, Picardy, and being of a somewhat adventurous spirit, he crossed the English Channel and became a British citizen and the secretary of a Scottish nobleman. In that capacity, he traveled with his employer on the Continent, particularly spending time in Italy. At about 31, he settled in Ghent and was employed by the city, where Adolphe was born, the fifth of nine children, several of whom died in childhood.

Francois died when Adolphe was only seven years old. Adolphe studied at the Ghent Lycée, where he afterwards started teaching mathematics in 1815 at the age of 19. In 1819, he moved to the Athenaeum in Brussels and in the same year he completed his dissertation (De quibusdam locis geometricis, necnon de curva focal – Of some new properties of the focal distance and some other curves).

Quetelet received a doctorate in mathematics in 1819 from the University of Ghent. Shortly thereafter, the young man set out to convince government officials and private donors to build an astronomical observatory in Brussels; he succeeded in 1828. He became a member of the Royal Academy in 1820. He lectured at the museum for sciences and letters and at the Belgian Military School. In 1825, he became a correspondent of the Royal Institute of the Netherlands, in 1827 he became a member. In 1839, he was elected as a member of the American Philosophical Society. From 1841 to 1851, he was a supernumerary associate in the institute, and when it became Royal Netherlands Academy of Arts and Sciences he became foreign member. In 1850, he was elected a foreign member of the Royal Swedish Academy of Sciences.

In 1825, he married Cécile-Virginie Curtet.

Quetelet also founded several statistical journals and societies, and was especially interested in creating international cooperation among statisticians. He encouraged the creation of a statistical section of the British Association for the Advancement of Science (BA), which later became the Royal Statistical Society, of which he became the first overseas member. In 1853 he chaired both the International Maritime Conference and the first International Statistical Congress. He was a founding member of the first Société des douze.

In 1855, Quetelet developed apoplexy, which diminished but did not end his scientific activity.

He died in Brussels on 17 February 1874, and is buried in the Brussels Cemetery.

== Work ==
His scientific research encompassed a wide range of different scientific disciplines: meteorology, astronomy, mathematics, statistics, demography, sociology, criminology and history of science. He made significant contributions to scientific development, but he also wrote several monographs directed to the general public. He founded the Royal Observatory of Belgium, founded or co-founded several national and international statistical societies and scientific journals, and presided over the first series of the International Statistical Congresses. Quetelet was a liberal and an anticlerical, but not an atheist or materialist nor a socialist.

=== Optics ===
Adolphe Quetelet discovered the optical phenomenon Quetelet rings.

=== Social physics ===
The new science of probability and statistics was mainly used in astronomy at the time, where it was essential to account for measurement errors around means. This was done using the method of least squares. Quetelet was among the first to apply statistics to social science, planning what he called a "social physics". He was keenly aware of the overwhelming complexity of social phenomena and of the many variables that needed measurement. His goal was to understand the statistical laws underlying such phenomena as crime rates, marriage rates, or suicide rates. He wanted to explain the values of these variables by other social factors. These ideas were rather controversial among other scientists at the time who held that it contradicted the concept of freedom of choice.

His most influential book was Sur l'homme et le développement de ses facultés, ou Essai de physique sociale, published in 1835 (In English translation, it is titled Treatise on Man, but a literal translation would be "On Man and the Development of his Faculties, or Essay on Social Physics"). In it, he outlines the project of a social physics and describes his concept of the "average man" (l'homme moyen) who is characterized by the mean values of measured variables that follow a normal distribution. He collected data about many such variables. Quetelet wrote about these values as "ideals" with deviations from them as being less than or more than ideal. He saw the average body as an ideal beauty and something to be desired and his work was influential on Francis Galton who coined the term eugenics.

Quetelet's student Pierre François Verhulst developed the logistic function in the 1830s as a model of population growth; see Logistic function § History for details.

When Auguste Comte discovered that Quetelet had appropriated the term 'social physics', which Comte had originally introduced, Comte found it necessary to invent the term 'sociologie' (sociology) because he disagreed with Quetelet's notion that a theory of society could be derived from a collection of statistics.

Adolphe Quetelet also had a significant influence on Florence Nightingale who shared with him a religious view of statistics which saw understanding statistics as revealing the work of God in addition to statistics being a force of good administration. Nightingale met Quetelet in person at the 1860 International Statistical Congress in London, and they corresponded for years afterwards.

=== Criminology ===
Quetelet was an influential figure in criminology. Along with Andre-Michel Guerry, he helped to establish the cartographic school and positivist schools of criminology which made extensive use of statistical techniques. Through statistical analysis, Quetelet gained insight into the relationships between crime and other social factors. Among his findings were strong relationships between age and crime, as well as gender and crime. Other influential factors he found included climate, poverty, education, and alcohol consumption, with his research findings published in Of the Development of the Propensity to Crime.

=== Anthropometry ===
Mean body mass index bmi in adult males

In his 1835 text on social physics, he presented his theory of human variance around the average, showing human traits were distributed according to a normal curve. The existence of such variation provided the basis for later writers, including Darwin, to argue that natural populations contained sufficient variability for artificial or natural selection to operate.

In terms of influence over later public health agendas, one of Quetelet's lasting legacies was the establishment of a simple measure for classifying people's weight relative to an ideal for their height. His proposal, the body mass index (or Quetelet index), has endured with minor variations to the present day. Anthropometric data is used in modern applications and referenced in the development of every consumer-based product.

== Awards and honours ==
Quetelet was elected a Foreign Member of the Royal Society (ForMemRS) in 1839.

The asteroid 1239 Queteleta is named after him. The title of Quetelet professor at Columbia University is awarded in his name.

== Publications ==
- 1823. Relation d'un voyage fait à la grotte de Han au mois d'août 1822. With M.M. Kickx.
- 1827. Recherches sur la population, les naissances, les décès, les prisons, les dépôts de mendicité, etc., dans le royaume des Pays-Bas.
- 1830. Notes extraites d'un voyage scientifique, fait en Allemagne pendant l'été 1829, Bruxelles
- 1829. Recherches statistiques sur le royaume des Pays-Bas.
- 1831. The Propensity to Crime.
- 1834. Astronomie élémentaire.
- 1835. Sur l'homme et le développement de ses facultés, ou Essai de physique sociale. 2 volumes.
  - Translated into English under the direction of Robert Knox as A Treatise on Man and the Development of His Faculties (Edinburgh, William and Robert Chambers, 1842)
- 1838. De l'influence des saisons sur la mortalité aux différens âges dans la Belgique.
- 1839. Catalogue des principales apparitions d'étoiles filantes.
- 1843. Sur l'emploi de la boussole dans les mines.
- 1845–1851. Sur le climat de la Belgique. 2 volumes.
- 1848. Du système social et des lois qui le régissent.
- 1848. Sur la statistique morale et les principes qui doivent en former la base.
- 1850. Mémoire sur les lois des naissances et de la mortalité à Bruxelles.
- 1853. Mémoire sur les variations périodiques et non périodiques de la température, d'après les observations faites, pendant vingt ans, à l'observatoire royal de Bruxelles.
- 1864. Histoire des sciences mathématiques et physiques chez les Belges.
- 1867. Météorologie de la Belgique comparée à celle du globe.
- 1867. Sciences mathématiques et physiques au commencement du XIXe siècle.
- 1869. Sur la physique du globe en Belgique.
- 1870. Anthropométrie, ou Mesure des différentes facultés de l'homme.
