= Mario Luis Small =

Sociologist

- Born: Mario Luis Small; Cerro Viento, Panama
- Education: Carleton College (BA); Harvard University (PhD)
- Occupation(s): Professor, Sociologist
- Employer: Columbia University
- Known for: Research in urban poverty, inequality, culture, networks, case study methods, and higher education
- Notable work: Villa Victoria: The Transformation of Social Capital in a Boston Barrio Unanticipated Gains: Origins of Network Inequality in Everyday Life

Mario Luis Small is a sociologist and Quetelet Professor of Social Science at Columbia University. Small's research interests include urban poverty, inequality, personal networks, and qualitative and mixed methods. Small was previously a faculty member at Harvard University, University of Chicago, and Princeton University.

== Biography ==
Small was born in Cerro Viento, Panama. He earned a B.A. in 1996 from Carleton College and an M.A. and Ph.D from Harvard University. He is currently the Quetelet Professor of Social Science at Columbia University.

Small has received many awards for his research, writings, and mentoring. He is the only person to win the C. Wright Mills Award for best book twice for Villa Victoria: The Transformation of Social Capital in a Boston Barrio in 2005 and Unanticipated Gains: Origins of Network Inequality in Everyday Life in 2010. He was elected to the National Academy of Sciences in 2022.

== Books ==
Small, Mario L., & McCrory Calarco, Jessica. 2022. Qualitative Literacy: A Guide to Evaluating Ethnographic and Interview Research. Berkeley and Los Angeles: University of California Press.

Small, Mario L. 2017. Someone To Talk To. New York: Oxford University Press.

Small, Mario L. 2009. Unanticipated Gains: Origins of Network Inequality in Everyday Life, New York: Oxford University Press

Small, Mario L. 2004. Villa Victoria: The Transformation of Social Capital in a Boston Barrio, Chicago: University of Chicago Press

== Contributions to sociology ==
Small has published books and numerous articles on urban poverty, personal networks, social inequality, and the relationship between qualitative and quantitative social science methods.

He has shown that poor neighborhoods in commonly-studied cities such as Chicago are not representative of ghettos everywhere, that how people understand and make sense of their neighborhood shapes how it affects them, and that local organizations in poor neighborhoods often broker connections to both people and organizations. Small has also demonstrated that people’s social capital—including how many people they know and how much they trust others—depends on the organizations in which they are embedded.

His work on methods has shown that many practices used to make qualitative research more scientific are ineffective.

Small has investigated why ghettos differ from city to city and how people decide whom to turn to when seeking support.

In his 2017 book Someone To Talk To Small explores whom Americans confide in. Existing theories and common sense suggest that people confide in their intimates, yet Small finds evidence that Americans often turn to people who are not close to them when discussing difficult topics. For example, many people respond to the US General Social Survey (GSS) question 'what are the people with whom you discussed matters important to you?’ by naming their close friends and family. Yet Small suggests these people are not necessarily the ones with whom respondents actually discuss matters important to them. Rather, people often confide in those with whom they have "weak ties," as the need for understanding or empathy trumps their fear of misplaced trust. For example, people may find themselves confiding in acquaintances and even strangers unexpectedly, without having reflected on the consequences.
