= Elijah Anderson (sociologist) =

American sociologist (born 1943)

- Born: 1943 (age 82–83)
- Education: Indiana University (BA); University of Chicago (MA); Northwestern University (PhD)
- Occupation: Sociologist
- Employer: Yale University

Elijah Anderson is an American sociologist and a Stockholm Prize Laureate for his pioneering research in criminology. He is currently the Sterling Professor of Sociology and of Black Studies at Yale University, where he directs the Urban Ethnography Project. He is one of the leading urban ethnographers and cultural theorists in the United States.

Previously, Anderson taught at Swarthmore College (1973–75) as an assistant professor of sociology before joining the faculty of the University of Pennsylvania, where he taught for thirty-two years, rising from assistant professor to associate professor with tenure in 1981, to full professor as the Max and Heidi Berry Term Professor in 1989, the Charles and William Day Professor in 1991, and the Charles and William Day Distinguished Professor in 1995.

In 2007, Anderson joined the Yale faculty as the William K. Lanman, Jr., Professor of Sociology and in 2018, he was appointed the Sterling Professor of Sociology and of African American Studies.

== Biography ==
Anderson was born in the Mississippi Delta and his family was part of the Great Migration from the South to the North, first to Chicago, and then to South Bend, Indiana, where his stepfather, Leighton Hull Sr., secured employment in the foundry of the Studebaker Corporation and his mother Carrie Bell, initially worked as a domestic in the homes of well-to-do white folks and soon thereafter started and managed a grocery store that served the local Black community.

Anderson attended the public schools of South Bend, where he was a precocious reader, first at Oliver School, the gerrymandered predominantly white school on the edge of his segregated Black neighborhood on the South Side of the city. Over time, his parents saved their money and moved the family to the West Side of South Bend, to what was at the time a racially mixed neighborhood; Linden, his local elementary school, was segregated. By the time he graduated from high school, his neighborhood had become racially segregated and all Black.

By the ages of ten and eleven, intent on earning his own spending money, he sold the South Bend Tribune newspaper on downtown street corners and worked at a bowling alley, where he set pins alongside grown men who were troubled, alcoholic, and at times homeless.

When his earlier jobs became demanding, Anderson sought employment among downtown businesses. He was subsequently hired by Marion Forbes, the owner of a typewriter store, to assist with general maintenance and repair work. Throughout his high school years, Anderson continued working for Forbes, who mentored him in typewriter servicing and repair and encouraged his academic and professional development.

After graduating from South Bend's Central High School in 1962, Anderson enrolled in the local extension of Indiana University, and later won an Indiana State scholarship that allowed him to matriculate at Indiana University at Bloomington.

At Bloomington, mentored by professors Frank Westie, and Alden Miller, a former student of Hubert Blalock, he majored in sociology and graduated in 1969. His professors recommended him for graduate studies at the University of Chicago. He applied and was then recruited by Professors Morris Janowitz, the chair, and Gerald D. Suttles, who became his advisors. Janowitz and Suttles's mission was to reinvigorate what was called the “Chicago School” of sociology with members of Anderson's cohort of graduate students.

During this period of political turmoil in the nation, there was great interest in the study of urban Black communities. As a member of Suttles and Janowitz's Center for Social Organization Studies, Anderson decided to study Black street corner men for his dissertation.

For three years, he conducted an ethnographic study of the Black men who frequented a corner bar and liquor store on Chicago's South Side. His resulting PhD dissertation was based on extensive qualitative fieldwork and directed by Gerald D. Suttles and Howard S. Becker. Eventually, it was published by the University of Chicago Press in 1978 as A Place on the Corner: A Study of Black Street Corner Men and is considered a classic work in the field of sociology.

For this ethnographic study, Anderson became immersed in the lives of the men at "Jelly's," the fictitious name he gave to the bar and liquor store in the South Side ghetto. During his fieldwork, he became deeply concerned about the social organization of the setting and particularly how the men "made and remade their social order" in everyday life. He examined and analyzed the issues of status and identity along "the color line," work that ultimately became the germ of Anderson's body of work and his future contributions to the field of sociology.

Over his career, Anderson has written numerous articles and book chapters, produced five edited volumes, and conducted five major ethnographic studies, beginning with his PhD dissertation, which the University of Chicago Press published as A Place on the Corner (1978), a study of the ways in which Black street corner men came together night after night to make and remake their local social order.

This study was followed by ethnographic work he conducted in Philadelphia, including Streetwise (1990), Code of the Street (1999), The Cosmopolitan Canopy (2011), and Black in White Space (2022). Each of these works builds on findings of the previous ones, producing a “body of work” that serves as a virtual ethnographic history of the nation’s urban environment.

After completing his original study of the Chicago ghetto, Anderson conducted an ethnographic study of Philadelphia’s Powelton Village, a racially mixed, gentrifying neighborhood adjacent to the inner-city ghetto of Mantua in West Philadelphia. For this work, he wanted to understand why so many middle-class white people settled and remained in a neighborhood that most white people residing outside the area considered too close to concentrations of Black people many labeled as “dangerous.”

Anderson found that the white newcomers invested not only their financial capital in the neighborhood; the fact that they were white helped the area's value to appreciate, with these white newcomers usually expecting Black residents to depart relatively soon. Over time, the city services improved, especially the schools, and housing prices increased. Eventually, the newly arrived white residents became acclimated to the local conditions and especially the street life. In a word, many became "streetwise" but effectively manage themselves on the local streets among Black people. Meanwhile, as the cost of living in the neighborhood increased, many Black residents departed for lower-income neighborhoods of the city. Anderson's book Streetwise: Race, Class, and Change in an Urban Community (1990) documents these changes in the neighborhood as it became gentrified.

As Anderson completed the fieldwork for this project, he wondered why so many young Black people engaged in violence and street crime. Starting with Mantua, his investigation took him into some of the most dangerous neighborhoods of Philadelphia, including Southwest and North Philadelphia, where the murder and crime rates were extremely high. He found that in these areas, the city, and particularly the police, had all but abdicated their responsibility to serve the local Black residents, who had limited faith that the police were there to "protect and defend" them.

By and large, in matters of security, these residents felt they were "on their own" and needed to take matters of personal security into their own hands. In doing so, they developed a code of the street. This fieldwork resulted in the pathbreaking article "The Code of the Streets," which was published as a cover story in the Atlantic Monthly in May 1994. Over the next few years, Anderson continued his fieldwork, which later resulted in his next publication and another classic work entitled Code of the Street: Decency, Violence, and the Moral Life of the Inner City (1999).

At this point, after studying crime and violence among people of the inner city, Anderson became interested in studying public spaces that were ostensibly more tolerant and civil. This led him to relocate his young family to Philadelphia's Rittenhouse Square, one of the toniest neighborhoods of the downtown area of Center City. He began by conducting an ethnographic study of the square, which he found to be unusually diverse and relatively civil. Here, he introduced the concept of “the cosmopolitan canopy,” an island of racial civility located in a sea of segregated living. He noted that in this area, people from a wide variety of social backgrounds appeared to get along in public while expressing civility toward one another. But on occasion this civility became challenged by some of the setting's more ethnocentric visitors.

After running out of patience, these visitors were inclined to draw the color line, not only toward Black people, but occasionally anyone they opposed and felt was deserving of their wrath. This peculiar discrimination was rare, and most often made, ethnic, gender, and sexual preference lines. But the color line between Blacks and whites was most conspicuous and salient; especially when it was abruptly drawn in a "moment of acute disrespect." Black denizens called this "the nigger moment," which is examined in detail at the end of The Cosmopolitan Canopy: Race and Civility in Everyday Life (2011). Strikingly, how, where, and when such moments drew the color line formed the hypothesis and set the stage for Anderson’s most recent ethnographic study, which builds on all his previous work, Black in White Space: The Enduring Impact of Color in Everyday Life (2022).

== Career ==
Elijah Anderson is one of the leading urban ethnographers in the United States. Anderson worked as an assistant professor of sociology at Swarthmore College (1973–1975). In 1975, he joined the University of Pennsylvania faculty where he rose to associate professor in 1981, and to full professor in 1988. He was appointed to the Max and Heidi Berry Term Chair in the Social Sciences in 1989, to the Charles and William L. Day Professorship in 1991, and then to Distinguished Professor in 2001.

Anderson served for many years as the Charles and William L. Day Distinguished Professor of the Social Sciences and Professor of Sociology at the University of Pennsylvania, with a secondary appointment in the Wharton School; in 2008, he was awarded the Charles and William L. Day Distinguished Professor Emeritus of the Social Sciences at the University of Pennsylvania. He has also served as visiting professor at Swarthmore College, Princeton University, and Ecole des Etudes Hautes en Science Sociales in Paris, France.

He has served in an editorial capacity for a wide range of professional journals and special publications in his field, including Qualitative Sociology, Ethnography, American Journal of Sociology, American Sociological Review, City & Community, Annals of the Society of Political and Social Science, and the International Journal of Urban and Regional Research. He has also served as a consultant to a variety of government agencies, including the White House, the United States Congress, the National Academy of Sciences, and the National Science Foundation. Additionally, he was a member of the National Research Council’s Panel on the Understanding and Control of Violent Behavior.

== Views and opinions ==
Anderson's ethnographic work has consistently shown that racism in the United States is not merely a relic of the past but a lived reality embedded in everyday encounters. His view is that structural inequalities especially housing segregation, policing, economic disinvestment, and public policy combine with everyday micro-level interactions to reproduce persistent racial disparities in health, education, employment, and occasional racial insults in public. He rejects simplistic or individualistic explanations of urban problems, such as those advanced by "culture of poverty" theorists, who tend to "blame the victim," and instead highlights the interplay between institutional neglect and personal agency.

Anderson maintains that while civil rights reforms have allowed many Black Americans to rise socioeconomically, these gains remain vulnerable to backlash and symbolic racism, a primary source of which is the power of the "iconic ghetto." In his writing and public commentary, Anderson has expressed concern about the persistence of "symbolic racism" prejudices masked by respectability politics or color-blind rhetoric and how such attitudes undermine genuine racial tolerance and social integration.

He is a critic of the term "microaggressions," preferring to highlight how even seemingly minor slights can be part of broader systems of racial exclusion. Anderson emphasizes the significance of what he calls the "N-word moment" the moment of acute disrespect or episodes where Black individuals are reminded in visceral ways of their "place" or outsider status in white-dominated spaces, during which they are told emphatically that they "do not belong."

In interviews and essays, Anderson has noted the emotional toll that comes with being what he calls a "perpetual stranger" in white spaces. Despite personal success, many Black professionals must perform respectability to avoid suspicion or harassment, a condition rooted in the enduring legacy of slavery and segregation, manifested today in the "iconic ghetto." He uses the term "white skin as racial capital" to describe how whiteness confers social and economic advantages in real estate markets, professional settings, and public spaces.

He affirms the potential for multiracial civility and solidarity, especially in cosmopolitan urban zones. However, he cautions that such spaces are exceptional, not typical, and that deeper changes in social institutions and attitudes are required to dismantle the enduring color line in American life.

== Scholarly works ==
Anderson has written numerous books, book chapters, articles, and scholarly reports on race relations in American cities. His scholarly works also include five edited volumes and five major ethnographic studies: Code of the Street: Decency, Violence, and the Moral Life of the Inner City (1999), winner of the 2000 Komarovsky Award from the Eastern Sociological Society, Streetwise: Race, Class, and Change in an Urban Community (1990), winner of the American Sociological Association’s Robert E. Park Award for the best published book in the area of Urban Sociology, and the classic sociological work, A Place on the Corner: A Study of Black Street Corner Men.

In 2011, he published The Cosmopolitan Canopy: Race and Civility in Everyday Life.

In 2008, he edited Against the Wall: Poor, Young, Black, and Male], which is based on a national conference, "Poor, Young, Black, and Male: A Case for National Action?" which he organized at the University of Pennsylvania in 2006.

His most recent ethnographic work is Black in White Space: The Enduring Impact of Color in Everyday Life (2022).

== Awards and honors ==
In addition, Anderson has won the Lindback Award for Distinguished Teaching at the University of Pennsylvania, and he was named the Robin M. Williams Jr., Distinguished Lecturer for 1999–2000 by the Eastern Sociological Society. In 2006, he was awarded an honorary Doctor of Science degree from Northwestern University. Anderson has served on the board of directors of the American Academy of Political and Social Science and as vice-president of the American Sociological Association.

In 2021, he was awarded the Stockholm Prize in Criminology, the world's most prestigious honor, in the field of Criminology, for his pioneering research identifying the etiology of violence in inner-city African American communities. The prize was officially presented by the Queen of Sweden in June 2022 at Stockholm's City Hall. He has also received the Robert E. Park Award from the American Sociological Association for his book Streetwise: Race, Class, and Change in an Urban Community (1990), and the Mirra Komarovsky Book Award from the Eastern Sociological Society for Code of the Street: Decency, Violence, and the Moral Life of the Inner City (1999). He has also received the Cox-Johnson-Frazier Award and the W.E.B. Du Bois Career of Distinguished Scholarship Award and the 2021 Robert and Helen Lynd Award for Lifetime Achievement, all from the American Sociological Association, as well as the Merit Award from the Eastern Sociological Society. Additionally, he was honored with the William Julius Wilson Award for the Advancement of Social Justice by Washington State University. And most recently, he is the recipient of the 2025 Edwin H. Sutherland Award of the American Society of Criminology.

== Selected publications ==
- The Cosmopolitan Canopy: Race and Civility in Everyday Life (2011, W.W. Norton)
- Against the Wall: Poor, Black, and Male (editor, 2008) ISBN 978-0-8122-4097-9
- A Place on the Corner: A Study of Black Street Corner Men (2nd ed., 2003)
- Problem of the Century: Racial Stratification in the United States (co-editor with D. Massey, 2001)
- Code of the street: Decency, violence, and the moral life of the inner city. New York: W.W. Norton, 1999, pp. 150–154, ISBN 978-0-393-04023-4.
- Streetwise: Race, Class and Change in an Urban Community (1990)
- Being Here and Being There: Fieldwork Encounters and Ethnographic Discoveries. From series The Annals of the American Academy of Political and Social Science, 595 (September) (co-editor with Scott N. Brooks, Raymond Gunn, and Nikki Jones, 2004) ISBN 978-1-4129-1395-9
- The Study of African American Problems: W.E.B. Du Bois's Agenda, Then and Now. From series The Annals of the American Academy of Political and Social Science, 568 (March) (co-editor with Tukufu Zuberi, 2000). ISBN 978-0-7619-2227-8
