= Quetelet professor =

The title of Quetelet Professor is a distinction awarded to professors at Columbia University. It is named after Adolphe Quetelet, the Belgian astronomer, mathematician, statistician, sociologist, and founder of the Royal Observatory of Belgium.

== Current recipients ==
The prize is currently held by:

- Paul Lazarsfeld, Q.p. of Social Science (1963, emeritus 1971); Lazarsfeld died in 1976.
- Peter Blau, Q.p. of sociology (1977, emeritus 1988); Blau died in 2002.
- Jonathan Cole, Q.p. of Social Science (1989)
- Jeffrey Sachs, Q.p. of sustainable development (2002)
- Mario Luis Small, Q.p. of Social Science (2022)
