= Quetelet rings =

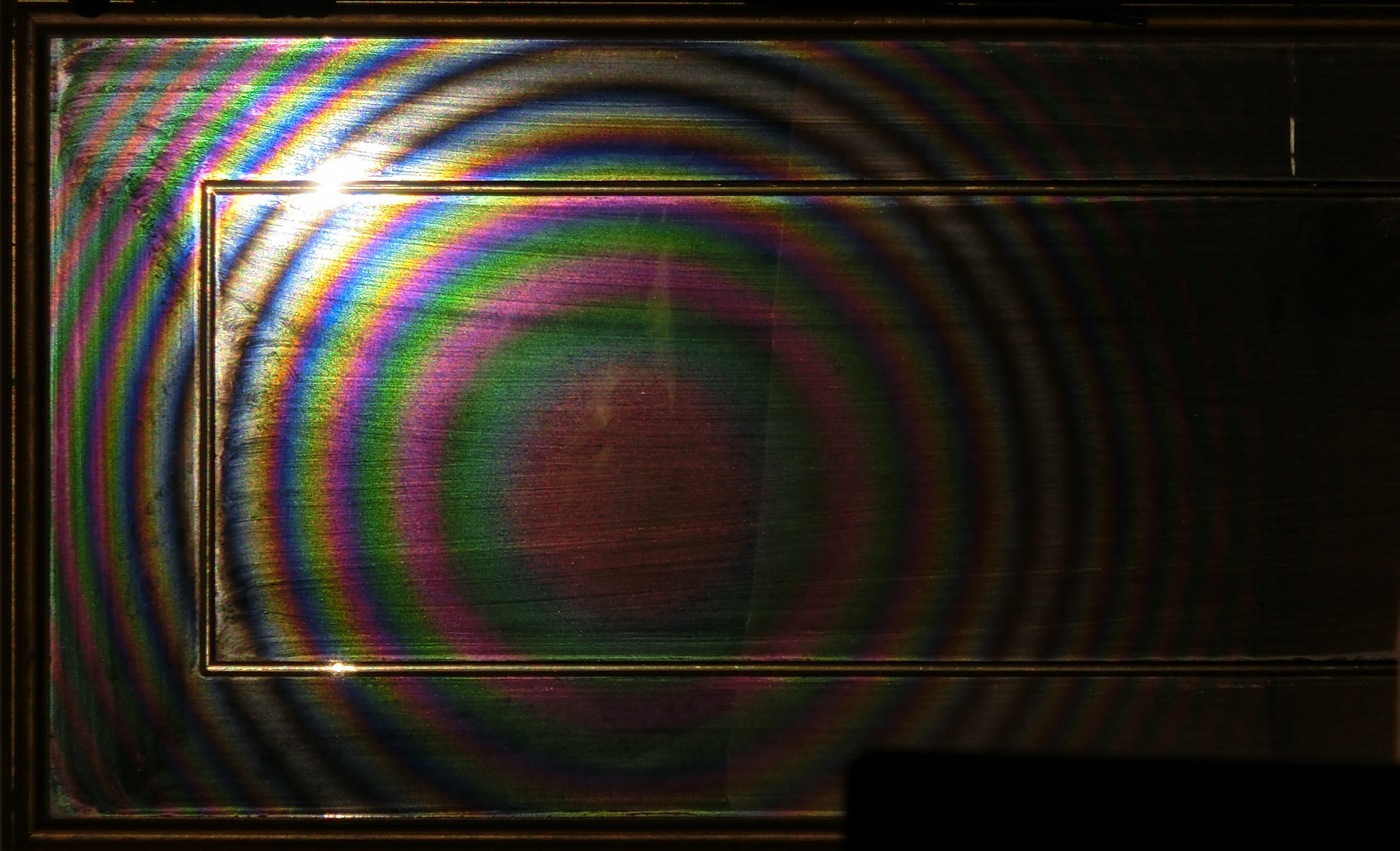
Quetelet rings on a dusty mirror

Quetelet rings are an optical interference pattern that appears on an illuminated reflective surface covered by fine particles, such as dust on a mirror. The phenomenon is named after the astronomer Adolphe Quetelet, who observed and explained it. A slight variation of this setup is sometimes called Newton's dusty mirror experiment, as Isaac Newton had also discovered the rings by the late 17th century, though he did not fully interpret or explain them.

Quetelet rings form due to wave interference between light that is first scattered by a particle and then reflected off the surface, and light that is first reflected by the surface and then scattered by the particle. The interference between these two light paths depends on the wavelength and the angles of light incidence and scattering. Constructive interference results in bright bands, while destructive interference leads to dark bands. When illuminated by white light, the patterns for different wavelengths become slightly misaligned, producing colored rings. These rings are most visible around the reflection of the light source, and their size depends on the proximity of the light source and observer to the surface, as well as the distance between the particles and the reflective surface.

== Gallery ==
Photographs of Quetelet rings on a mirror covered with talcum powder. The camera and light source are positioned five meters from the mirror, with the distance between the camera and the light source increasing up to 50 cm. The camera is focused at infinity.

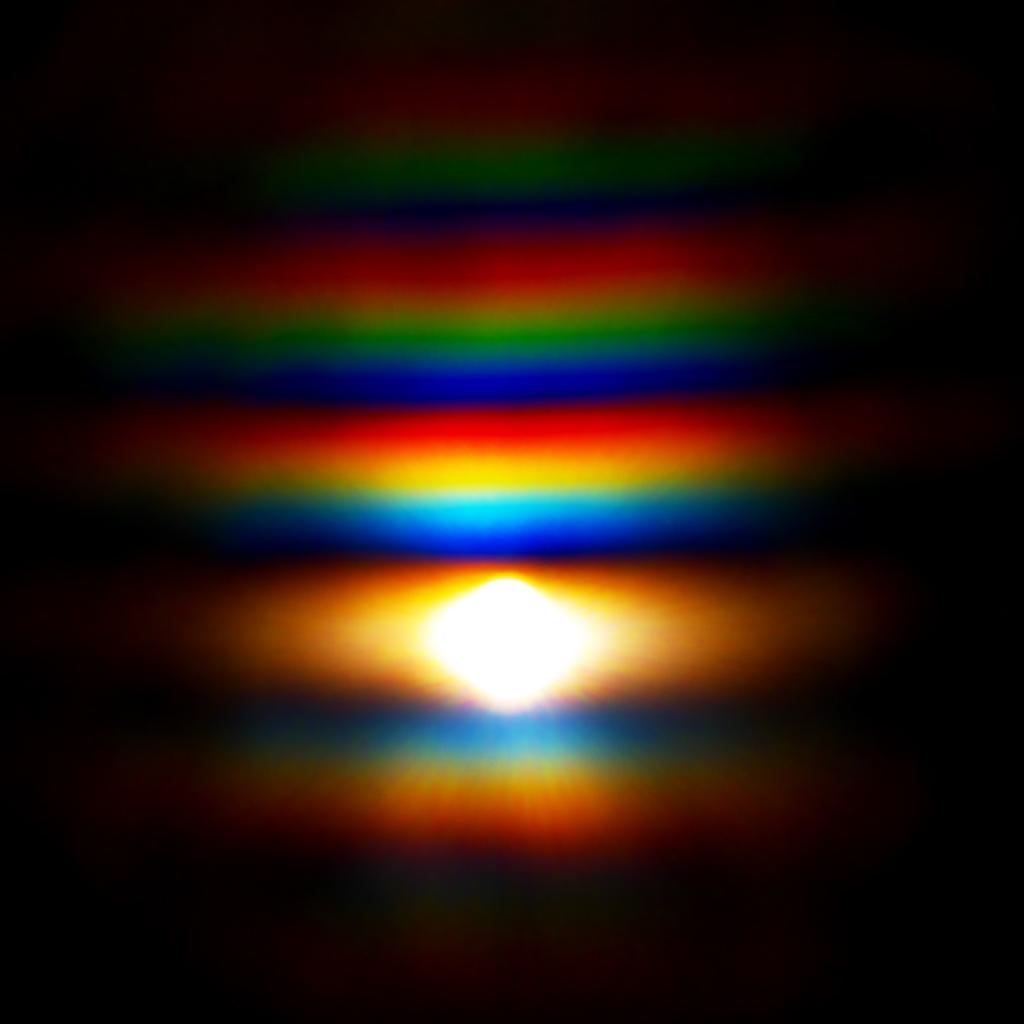
Light source positioned directly next to the camera lens.

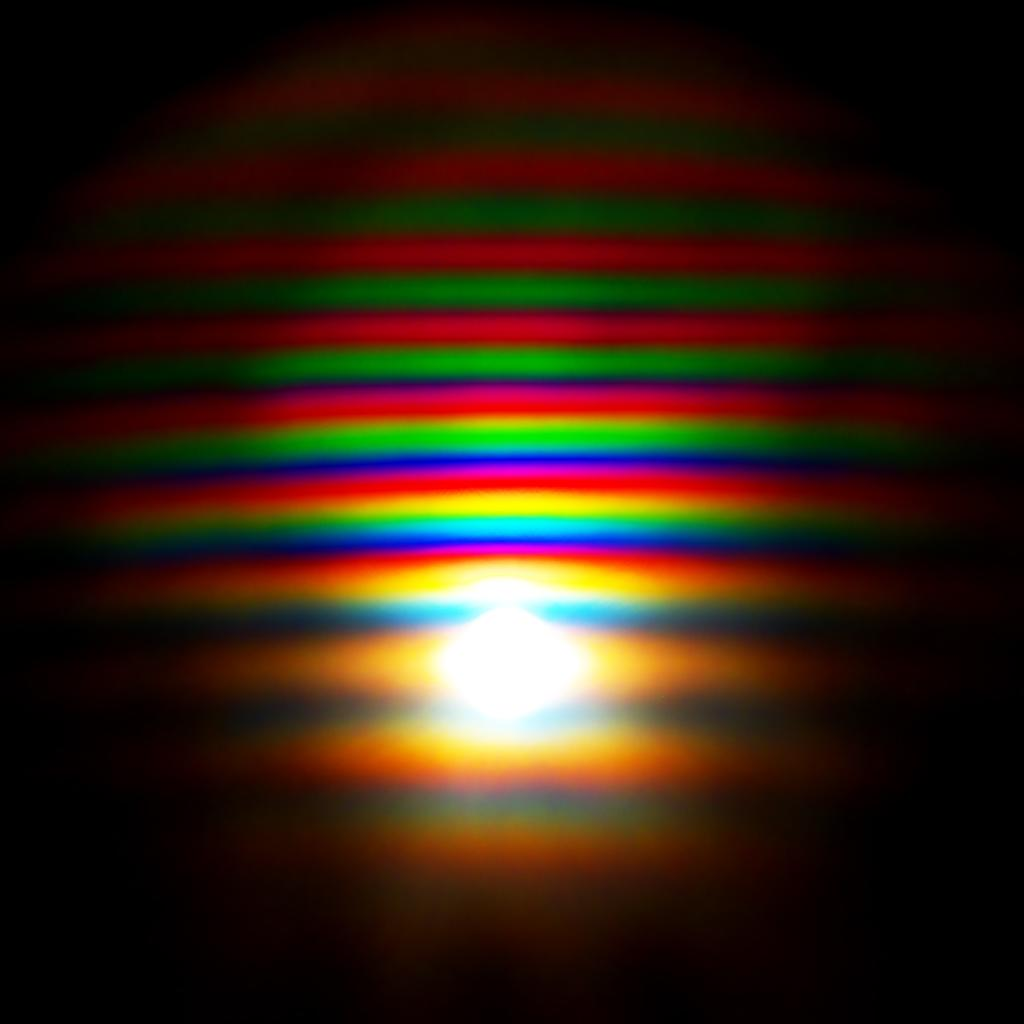
Light source positioned 10 cm away from the camera lens.

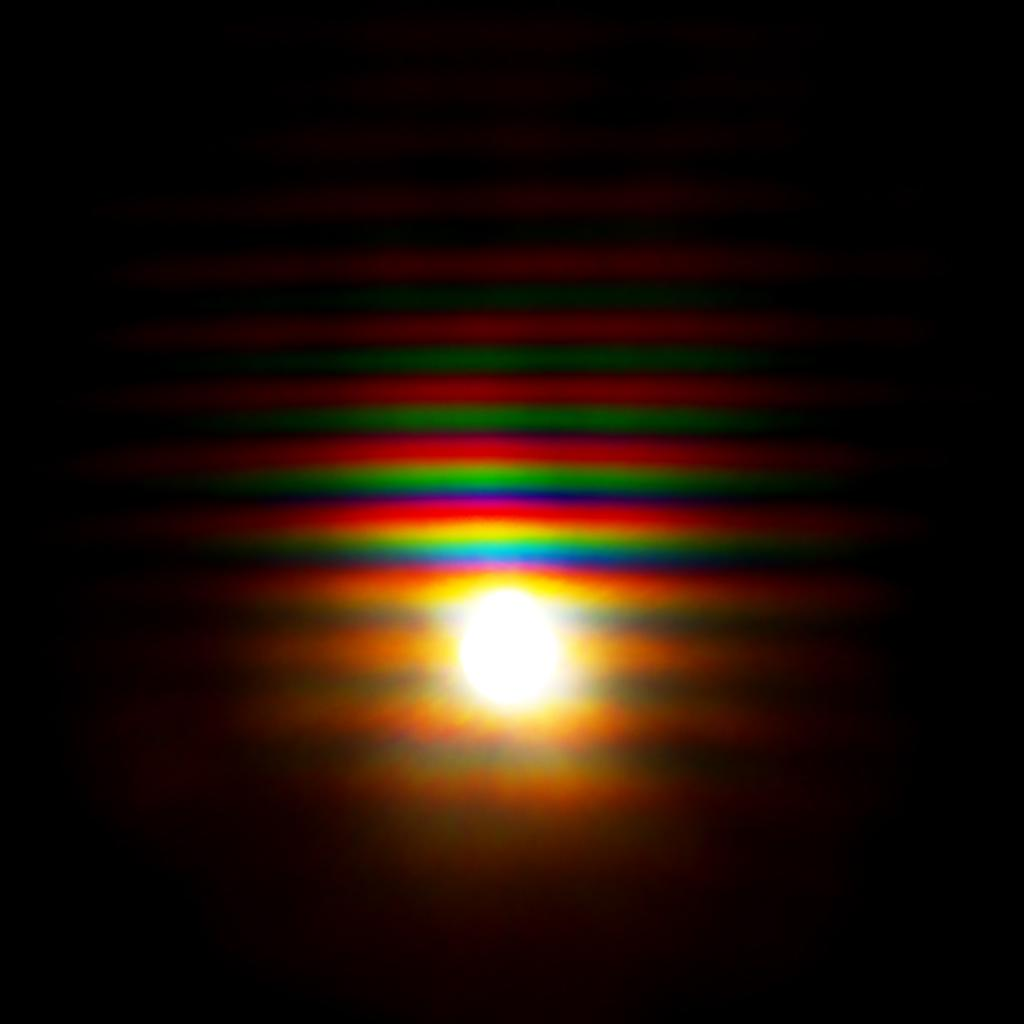
Light source positioned 25 cm away from the camera lens.

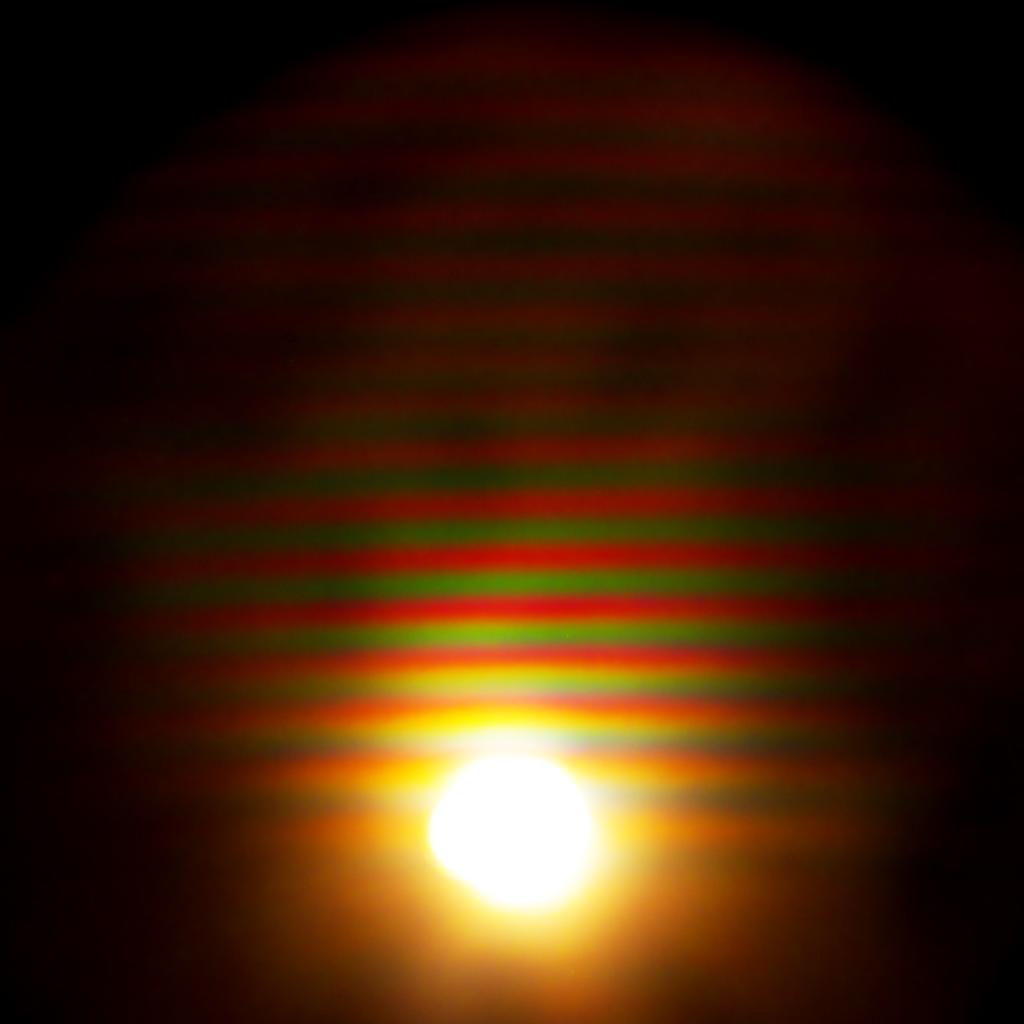
Light source 50 cm from the camera lens.

A video demonstrating Quetelet rings on a mirror covered in flour, with the flashlight moving around the observer.

Quetelet rings in motion
