= Laurence Ralph =

American anthropologist

- Occupations: Researcher, writer and filmmaker
- Awards: Guggenheim Fellowship; Fellowship, Center for Advanced Study in the Behavioral Sciences; Andrew Carnegie Fellowship, Carnegie Corporation

Academic background
- Education: B.S. in History, Technology, and Society; M.A. Anthropology; PhD, Anthropology
- Alma mater: The University of Chicago
- Website: https://laurenceralphauthor.com/

Laurence Ralph is an American writer, filmmaker and researcher. He is a professor of anthropology at Princeton University and the Director of Center on Transnational Policing.

Ralph's research interests include urban ethnography, disability studies, social inequality, African American studies, race, policing, theories of violence, popular culture and hip-hop. He authored the books Renegade Dreams: Living Through Injury in Gangland in 2014 and The Torture Letters: Reckoning with Police Violence in 2020. He is also writer and director of the animated short film, The Torture Letters.

Ralph has received the Guggenheim and Carnegie Fellowships, and is a fellow of the Radcliffe Institute for Advanced Study. He also received a fellowship from Center for Advanced Study in the Behavioral Sciences, Stanford University, and a Trustees Fellowship from the University of Chicago. He has received grants from the National Science Foundation, the Wenner Gren Foundation, and the National Research Council of the National Academies and is a member of the Institute for Advanced Study and the Center for Advanced Study in the Behavioral Sciences. He is the Editor in Chief at Current Anthropology and has been the Associate Editor at Transforming Anthropology.

== Education ==
Ralph received his Bachelor of Science degree in history, Technology and Society from the Georgia Institute of Technology in 2004. He then earned his M.A. and PhD in anthropology from The University of Chicago in 2006 and 2010 respectively.

== Career ==
Ralph began his academic career at the University of Michigan in 2010, where he was a Visiting Faculty member and a Mandela-Rodney-Dubois Postdoctoral fellow at the Center for African and Afro American Studies. He was an assistant professor in the Departments of African and African American Studies and Anthropology at Harvard University from 2011 to 2015, after which he became the John L. Loeb Associate Professor of the Social Sciences till 2017 and subsequently became the Professor of Anthropology and African American Studies there. Since 2018, he has been the Professor of Anthropology at Princeton University.

Since 2015, he has been the Director at the Center of Transnational Policing and since 2017, he has been on the Advisory Council of the Wenner Gren Foundation.

== Works ==
Ralph's work focuses on the way police abuse, mass incarceration and the drug trade have historically normalized disease, disability and the premature death of black urbanites as they are often perceived as being expendable. The research he does lies at the junction of critical medical and political anthropology, African-American studies and the emerging scholarship on disability and he combined the literature on these to show for black urban residents, violence and injury plays a central role in their day-to-day lives. He has explored these themes in Disability Studies Quarterly, Transition, Anthropological Theory, and Identities: Global Studies in Culture and Power.

In an article, Ralph examines the life and career of a Chicago police detective, Richard Zuley, who tortured criminal suspects in the United States and Guantánamo Bay. He builds on the scholarship on white supremacy, as he discusses the schema of racism that informs state-sanctioned violence which is often subconsciously used as a rationale for fighting terrorism as it is deeply ingrained in people's minds and cannot be "unthought." His findings in the Torture without Torturers paper concluded that the legal categorization of trauma is problematic as it rationalizes the inequality of police brutality on black victims because of the allowances that are given which betray the implicit assumption that they are debilitated because of their racialized status before any reprieve can be offered by the law. In The logic of the slave patrol: the fantasy of black predatory violence and the use of force by the police, he studied the 2014 shootings and discovered that in the instance McDonald shooting, the gun helped in reproducing the fantasy of Black predatory violence that stems from slavery. While examining the mechanisms used by African American residents in a low-income community in the Westside of Chicago, he gained valuable insights in the ways in which they face a dearth of institutional resources, differ from popular expectations of mourning and thus develop the concept of "becoming aggrieved" which is not just mourning death but also about affirming life. In his article on The Qualia of pain, he considers the relationship between the qualitative experience, enactments of violence and the intense silences that obscure its recognition. He argued that black urbanites could convert their experiences of injury into communal narratives by coming to terms with the qualia of pain. In another study, he detailed what wounds revealed about diversity in stigmatized groups and ethnographically examined anti-gang forums hosted by disabled ex-gang members, enabling them to save lives, making a point about it being politically strategic to inhabit the role of a "defective body" as to make claims about a violent society.

=== Books ===
In 2014, Ralph published his book, Renegade Dreams: Living Through Injury in Gangland Chicago with the University of Chicago Press. The book won the Society for the Study of Social Problems: C. Wright Mills Award and the J.I. Staley Award from the School for Advanced Research. Renegage Dreams emphasizes on the aftermath of the "war-on-drugs" along with mass incarceration, the consequences of heroin trafficking for teenagers that are HIV positive, the danger of gunshot violence and the subsequent injuries sustained by gang-members. This allowed him to detail the social forces that make black residents susceptible to diseases and disability. William Julius Wilson praised it: "Renegade Dreams is a tour de force―extremely well written and engaging, and replete with original insights. Once I began reading Ralph’s book I had a difficult time putting it down. His field research is fascinating. And his explicit discussion of the interconnections of inner-city injury with government, community institutions, as well as how it is related to historical and social processes, is a major contribution." The Times Higher Education said that "Although it lacks the easy narrative of many traditional ethnographies, this is precisely the book’s strength. There is no convenient valorisation of the ordinary extraordinariness of the lives portrayed here. Their dreams are shown to be chaotic, complex and contradictory. Just like life in 'Eastwood.'"

Ralph published another book in 2020, The Torture Letters: Reckoning with Police Violence, also with the University of Chicago Press. The Torture Letters won the Robert Textor Prize for Excellence in Anticipatory Anthropology This book explores Chicago police torturing more than 125 black people over more than a decade as well as the physical and emotional scars it left and the political dynamics surrounding the scandal. Henry Louis Gates, Jr. described the book: "Devastatingly powerful, The Torture Letters is one of those extraordinary volumes whose contents are accessible to all readers. It is a necessary and important book that measures both the economic and, more importantly, human cost of police violence." Publishers Weekly called it "[a] deeply caring work. . . An essential primer on the roots of police violence" and Kirkus Reviews said, "Ralph brings necessary light to the problem of police torture. A damning indictment of the senseless and seemingly unceasing violence committed by those charged with serving the public."

Ralph adapted the book into an animated short film, also called The Torture Letters which was featured in The New York Times Opinion Documentary series. It won Best in Show at Spark Animation Film Festival, the Diversity Award at Women in Animation, and the Social Impact Award at the Black in Animation. The Torture Letters also qualified for an Academy Award in the animated short category. According to WIA President Marge Dean The Torture Letters uses the medium of animation in the best way possible by telling a story that is not often heard but is critical for the advancement of humanity."

Ralph's most recent book, Sito: An American Teenager and the City that Failed Him, was published in February of 2024. It was described as a "readable, empathic portrayal of a Hispanic teenager whose promising life was cut short because of failures in the criminal justice system and violence in the streets." Sito had a personal connection to Ralphs life, in that the titular teenager was the younger half brother of Laurence Ralph's stepson. Despite Ralph and Sito only having met once, The New York Times described the book as being "too close" to the subject matter, as the perspective of the family that villainized Sito before his death was not included.

== Awards and honors ==
- 2004 – Andrew W. Mellon Fellowship in Humanistic Studies, Woodrow Wilson National Fellowship Foundation
- 2004 – Trustees Fellowship, University of Chicago
- 2005 – National Science Foundation Graduate Research Fellowship Award
- 2009 – Mellon Dissertation Year Fellowship, University of Chicago
- 2009 – Erskine Peters Dissertation Year Fellowship, University of Notre Dame
- 2010 – Du Bois-Mandela-Rodney Post-Doctoral fellowship, University of Michigan
- 2012 – Ford Foundation Diversity Postdoctoral Fellowship, National Research Council of the National Academies
- 2015 – Visiting Fellow, Radcliffe Institute for Advanced Study, Cambridge, MA
- 2015 – Andrew Carnegie Fellowship, Carnegie Corporation of New York
- 2019 – Humanities Council Magic Grant, David A. Gardner ’69 Fund, Princeton University
- 2021 – Fellowship, Center for Advanced Study in the Behavioral Sciences, Stanford University
- 2021 – John Simon Guggenheim Fellowship

== Bibliography ==
=== Books ===
- Renegade Dreams: Living through Injury in Gangland Chicago (2014) ISBN 9780226032719
- The Torture Letters: Reckoning with Police Violence (2020) ISBN 9780226729800
- Sito: An American Teenager and the City that Failed Him (2024) ISBN 9781538740323
