= Brewing Justice =

Book by Daniel Jaffee

Brewing Justice: Fair Trade Coffee, Sustainability, and Survival
- Author: Daniel Jaffee
- Language: English
- Publisher: University of California Press
- Publication date: April 2007; updated edition with new preface September 2014.
- Publication place: United States
- Pages: 331
- ISBN: 978-0-520-24958-5 (first edition, hardcover), ISBN 978-0-520-24959-2 (US paperback edition), ISBN 978-0-520-28224-7 (revised edition).
- OCLC: 70668618
- Dewey Decimal: 382/.41373091724 22
- LC Class: HD9199.D442 J34 2007

Brewing Justice: Fair Trade Coffee, Sustainability, and Survival is a book by American academic Daniel Jaffee, Professor of Sociology at Portland State University. It received the C. Wright Mills Book Award in 2008.
