= Pierrette Hondagneu-Sotelo =

American sociologist

- Born: Pierrette Hondagneu; Redwood City, California, United States

Academic background
- Education: University of California, San Diego (B.A.); University of California, Berkeley (M.A. and Ph.D.)

Academic work
- Institutions: University of Southern California
- Main interests: Gender studies, Migration studies, Latino studies
- Website: http://www.hondagneu-sotelo.org/

Pierrette Hondagneu-Sotelo is an American sociologist. Her main areas of research are gender, migration studies, and Latino studies. She has authored several books, received numerous awards and honors, and contributed to the field through various talks, publications, and mentoring. In 2015, she received the Distinguished Career Award from the American Sociological Association, International Migration Section, and in 2018 she received the Julian Samora Distinguished Career Award from the American Sociological Association, Latina/o Sociology Section.

== Biography ==
Since 1992, Hondagneu-Sotelo has worked as a professor of sociology at the University of Southern California. Her work has been funded by the Rockefeller Foundation for the Humanities, the UCLA Chicano Studies Research Center, UCSD's Center for U.S.-Mexican Studies, the Getty Research Institute, and the School for Advanced Research. She has been cited more than 13,000 times. Hondagneu-Sotelo lives in South Pasadena, CA with her husband Michael Messner, a sociologist and author. They have two sons, Miles and Sasha.

== Works (selection) ==
=== Books ===
- Hondagneu-Sotelo, P. (1994). Gendered Transitions: Mexican Experiences of Immigration. University of California Press.
- Romero, M, Hondagneu-Sotelo, P., and Ortiz, V. (Ed.). (1997). Challenging Fronteras: Structuring Latina and Latino Lives in the U.S.
- Hondagneu-Sotelo, P. (2001). Domestica: Immigrant Workers Cleaning and Caring in the Shadows of Affluence. University of California Press. (New edition, with new preface "The Domestic Goes Global," in 2007.)
- Hondagneu-Sotelo, P. (Ed.). (2003). Gender and U.S. Immigration: Contemporary Trends. University of California Press.
- Hondagneu-Sotelo, P (Ed.). (2007). Religion and Social Justice for Immigrants. Rutgers University Press.
- Hondagneu-Sotelo, P. (2008). God's Heart Has No Borders: Religious Activism for Immigrant Rights. University of California Press.
- Gutierrez, D., Hondagneu-Sotelo (Eds.), P. (2009). Nation and Migration. Johns Hopkins University Press.
- Hondagneu-Sotelo, P. (2011). Domestica: Trabajadoras Inmigrantes a Cargo de la Limpieza y el Cuidado a la Sombra de la Abundancia. Mexico, DF: Editorial Porrua y Instituto Nacional de Migracion.
- Hondagneu-Sotelo, P. (2014). Paradise Transplanted: Migration and the Making of California Gardens. University of California Press.
- Baca Zinn, M. B., Hondagneu-Sotelo, P., and Messner, M. A., Denissen, A.M. (Ed.). (2016). Gender Through the Prism of Difference (fifth edition). Oxford University Press.

=== Articles ===
- Hondagneu-Sotelo, P. (1992). "Overcoming Patriarchal Constraints: The Reconstruction of Gender Relations Among Mexican Immigrant Women and Men". Gender & Society. Vol. 6, pp. 393–415.
- Hondagneu-Sotelo, P. (1994). "Regulating the Unregulated: Domestic Workers' Social Networks". Social Problems. Vol. 41, pp. 201–215.
- Hondagneu-Sotelo, P. (1995). "Women and Children First: New Directions in Anti-Immigrant Politics". Socialist Review. Vol. 25, pp. 160–180.
- Hondagneu-Sotelo, P., Avila, E. (1997). "'I'm Here but I'm There': The Meanings of Latina Transnational Motherhood". Gender & Society. Vol. 11, pp. 548–571.
- Huisman, K., Hondagneu-Sotelo, P. |. (2005). Dress Matters: Change and Continuity in the Dress Practices of Bosnian Muslim Refugee Women. Gender and Society. Vol. 19(1), pp. 44–65.
- Ramirez, H., Hondagneu-Sotelo, P. (2009). "Mexican Immigrant Gardeners: Exploited Workers or Entrepreneurs?". Social Problems. Vol. 56 (1), pp. 70–88.
- Hondagneu-Sotelo, P. (2010). "Cultivating Questions for a Sociology of Gardens". Journal of Contemporary Ethnography. Vol. 39, pp. 102–131.
- Estrada, E., Hondagneu-Sotelo, P. (2011). "Intersectional Dignities: Latina Immigrant Adolescent Street Vendors in Los Angeles". Journal of Contemporary Ethnography. Vol. 40 (1), pp. 102–131.
- Hondagneu-Sotelo, P., Estrada, E., Ramirez, H. (2011). "Mas alla de la Domesticidad: Un analisis de genero de los trabajos inmigrantes del sector informal". Papers: Revista de Sociologia (Spain). Vol. 96 (3), pp. 805–824.
- Golash-Boza, T., Hondagneu-Sotelo, P. (2013). "Latino Immigrant Men and the Deportation Crisis: A Gendered Racial Removal Program". Latino Studies. Vol. 11 (3), pp. 476–490.
- Flores, E. O., Hondagneu-Sotelo, P. (2013). "Chicano Gang Members in Recovery: The Public Talk of Negotiating Chicano Masculinities". Social Problems. Vol. 60 (4), pp. 476–490.
- Flores, G. M., Hondagneu-Sotelo, P. (2014). "The Social Dynamics Channeling Latina College Graduates into the Teaching Profession". Gender, Work & Organization. Vol. 21 (6), pp. 491–515.
- Hondagneu-Sotelo, P. (2014). "Paradise Transplanted, Paradise Lost?". Boom: A Journal of California. Vol. 4 (3), pp. 86–94.
- Hondagneu-Sotelo, P. (2017). Place, Nature, and Masculinity in Immigrant Integration: Latino Immigrant Men in Inner-city Parks and Community Gardens. Norma: International Journal for Masculinity Studies. Vol. published on-line June 2017
- Hondagneu-Sotelo, P. (2017). "At Home in Inner-City Immigrant Community Gardens". Journal of Housing and the Built Environment. Vol. 32 (1), pp. 13–28.
