= Gerald D. Suttles =

Gerald Dale Suttles (1932–2017) was an American urban sociologist.

Gerald Suttles was born in North Carolina to parents Gertrude and Berlin Suttles. He served in the United States Navy from 1951 to 1955 before attending Reed College. Suttles earned his doctorate from the University of Illinois at Urbana–Champaign. While researching his first book, Suttles moved to what became the Tri-Taylor area of Chicago's Near West Side, where he lived for three years. The Social Order of the Slum was published in 1968, and won the C. Wright Mills Award from the Society for the Study of Social Problems that year, followed by the University of Chicago's Gordon J. Laing Award in 1970. Suttles began teaching at the University of Chicago in 1967. He left Chicago for a position at Stony Brook University in 1971. Suttles returned to Chicago in 1976. In 1993, the American Sociological Association bestowed upon Suttles its Robert and Helen Lynd Award for Lifetime Achievement. He remained on Chicago's faculty until retirement in 1997. Suttles and his wife Kirsten Gronbjerg moved to Bloomington, Indiana, where Suttles accepted an adjunct professorship at Indiana University. He died in Bloomington on May 11, 2017. His "Ethnobiography," A Journey Through Social Change: From the Mountains of Western North Carolina to the Slums of Chicago, edited by Kirsten Gronbjerg, his wife, was published in 2020.

== Books ==
- Suttles, Gerald D. (2020). A Journey Through Social Change: From the Mountains of North Carolina to the Slums of Chicago, Edited by Kirsten A. Gronbjerg. Lulu Press, 424 pages, $24.95. ISBN 979-1716626868.
- Suttles, Gerald D. (2011). Front Page Economics. University of Chicago Press. p. 253. ISBN 9780226781983.
- Gronbjerg, Kirsten; Street, David; Suttles, Gerald D. (1978). Poverty and Social Change. University of Chicago Press. pp. 248. ISBN 9780226309620.
- Suttles, Gerald D. (1990). The Man-Made City: The Land-Use Confidence Game in Chicago. University of Chicago Press. p. 326. ISBN 9780226781938.
- Suttles, Gerald D. (1972). The Social Construction of Communities. University of Chicago Press. pp. 278. ISBN 9780226781907.
- Suttles, Gerald (1968). The Social Order of the Slum: Ethnicity and Territory in the Inner City. University of Chicago Press. pp. 243. ISBN 9780226781921.
