= John R. Sutton =

John Raymond "Jack" Sutton (born 1949) is a professor of sociology at the University of California, Santa Barbara. Sutton specializes in organizations, the sociology of law, and crime and punishment. His research has established relationships among unemployment, economic inequality, social welfare, race, and incarceration in modern Western democracies. He has also used quantitative analysis of complex networks to develop dynamic relational models of legal policies and management practices of employers in the United States.

== Education and career ==
Sutton received his B.A. in literature and sociology from the University of California, Santa Cruz, in 1971; his M.A. in religion (social ethics) from the University of Southern California in 1973; and his Ph.D. in sociology from the University of California, Davis, in 1981. He did postdoctoral work at the Organizations Research Training Program in the Department of Sociology at Stanford University from 1981 to 1983 and taught in the Department of Sociology at Princeton University from 1983 to 1988.

Sutton's first book, Stubborn Children: Controlling Delinquency in the United States, 1640-1981, won the C. Wright Mills Award and was recognized for its integration of theory, quantitative analysis, and primary research. Reviewers described it as a corrective to aspects of Karl Marx, Michel Foucault, and Max Weber, and also as having described previously unexplored features of the history of American legal institutions. Sutton's textbook, Law/Society: Origins, Interactions, and Change, is also noted for the breadth of its theoretical scope and the integration of that theory with empirical examples. It filled a gap in the subfield of sociology of law when it was written, and it continues to be widely used in sociology of law and other law school classes.

Sutton has been awarded multiple National Science Foundation grants and a Lilly Endowment grant. He currently teaches at the University of California, Santa Barbara. His courses include Sociology of Crime and Delinquency; Sociology of Law; the Structure and Dynamics of Organizations; and Race, Crime, and Punishment.

== Selected bibliography ==
=== Books ===
- Sutton, John R. (1988). Stubborn Children: Controlling Delinquency in the United States, 1640-1981. Berkeley and Los Angeles: University of California Press. ISBN 978-0520084520
- Sutton, John R. (2001). Law/Society: Origins, Interactions, and Change. Thousand Oaks, CA: Pine Forge Press. ISBN 978-0761987055

=== Articles and essays (sole author) ===
- Sutton, John R. (1991). “The Political Economy of Madness: The Expansion of the Asylum in Progressive America,” American Sociological Review 56: 665-678.
- Sutton, John R. (2000). “Imprisonment and Social Classification in Five Common-Law Democracies, 1955-1985,” American Journal of Sociology 106: 350-386.
- Sutton, John R. (2004). “The Political Economy of Imprisonment in Affluent Western Democracies, 1960-1990,” American Sociological Review 69: 170-189.
- Sutton, John R. (2012). “Imprisonment and Opportunity Structures: A Bayesian Hierarchical Analysis,” European Sociological Review 28: 12-27.
- Sutton, John R. (2013). "Symbol and Substance: Impacts of California's Three Strikes Law on Felony Sentencing," Law & Society Review 47: 37-71.
- Sutton, John R. (2013). "Structural Bias in the Sentencing of Felony Defendants," Social Science Research 42: 1207-21.
- Sutton, John R. (2013). "The Transformation of Prison Regimes in Late Capitalist Societies," American Journal of Sociology 119: 715-746.

=== Articles in collaboration with others ===
- Dobbin, Frank; Sutton, John R.; Meyer, John W. & Scott, W. Richard. (1993). "Equal Opportunity Law and the Construction of Internal Labor Markets," American Journal of Sociology 99: 396-427. JSTOR 2781683
- Sutton, John R.; Dobbin, Frank; Meyer, John W. & Scott, W. Richard. (1994). "The Legalization of the Workplace," American Journal of Sociology 99: 944-971. JSTOR 2781736
- Sutton, John R. & Dobbin, Frank. (1996). “The Two Faces of Governance: Responses to Legal Uncertainty in American Firms, 1955-1985,” American Sociological Review 61: 794-811.
- Dobbin, Frank & Sutton, John R. (1998). "The Strength of the Weak State: The Employment Rights Revolution and the Rise of Human Resource Management Divisions," American Journal of Sociology 104: 441-476. JSTOR 210044
