= Elliot Liebow =

American urban anthropologist (1925–1994)

Elliot Liebow (1925–1994) was an American urban anthropologist, ethnographer, and author.

== Career ==
His best-known books were Tally's Corner: A Study of Negro Streetcorner Men (1967) and Tell Them Who I Am: The Lives of Homeless Women (1993), both of which were participant observer studies of people in impoverished urban areas. In addition to his microsociological writings, Liebow worked for more than 25 years at the National Institute of Mental Health, where he was chief of the Center for the Study of Work and Mental Health. He also authored poetry and children's books. From 1990 until his death, he held the Patrick Cardinal O'Boyle Professorship at the National Catholic School for Social Service at Catholic University of America in Washington, D.C.

Tally's Corner grew out of Liebow's Ph.D. dissertation in anthropology at Catholic University. Rather than rely on questionnaires, structured interviews, and other standard data collection tools, Liebow immersed himself in the streetcorner subculture of downtown Washington, D.C., during an 18-month period in 1962–63. As he described it:

The great bulk of the material is drawn from two dozen Negro men who share a corner in Washington's Second Precinct as a base of operations. These men are unskilled construction workers, casual day laborers, menial workers in retailing or in the service trades, or are unemployed. They range in age from the early twenties to the middle forties. Some are single, some married men; some of the latter are living with their wives and children, some not. The main body of the data comprises a record of the day-by-day routines of these men as they frequented the streetcorner, the alleys, hallways, poolrooms, beer joints and private houses in the immediate neighborhood.

Tally's Corner is considered a classic work of ethnography as Liebow was able to get the men to speak candidly to him about their work, wives, children, friends and themselves. The book was a surprise success, eventually selling more than a million copies. However, Tally's Corner has also been widely criticized for failing to explore or acknowledge the constraints of systemic, institutional racism on the lives and social conditions of African Americans.

Tell Them Who I Am chronicles the struggles of homeless women in Washington D.C., using data that Liebow collected at soup kitchens and homeless shelters. He said his principal aims for the book were "to write a straightforward description of shelter life", "to see the world of homelessness as homeless women see and experience it", and "to explain both to myself and others how these women remained human in the face of inhuman conditions."
