= Sharon Zukin =

American professor of sociology (born 1946)

Sharon L. Zukin is an American professor of sociology who specializes in modern urban life. She is a professor emerita at Brooklyn College and the Graduate Center, City University of New York. She has been a fellow of the Advanced Research Collaborative at the CUNY Graduate Center and chair of the sections on community and urban sociology and consumers and consumption of the American Sociological Association Consumers and Consumption Section, as well as a visiting professor at Tongji University (Shanghai), the University of Amsterdam, and the University of Western Sydney.

== Career and thought ==
=== Early career ===
Zukin's academic training was focused on political sociology. She had not taken any specific courses in urban sociology before being hired to teach the subject to undergraduates at Brooklyn College. In an interview, she describes how she first immersed herself in urban sociology literature to aid her teaching, and was later inspired to carry out field research by reading a newspaper article about manufacturers who were being forced out of their loft space in Lower Manhattan.

I said, I could help them—I'm a sociologist. Their landlord should not throw them out of their space. So I went to down to see them and did a little survey about their situation. I wound up advocating in support of their cause with the local community board and the city government, and eventually that turned into the research I did for my first urban book, Loft Living. And that's really how I became an urban sociologist—by doing research.

Other early influences include Walter Benjamin's 1931 essay "Paris, Capital of the 19th Century" and anthropologist Sidney Mintz's 1986 book Sweetness and Power: The Place of Sugar in Modern History.

=== Theoretical and political orientation ===
Zukin's research interests and analytical framework place her in the broad category of Neo-Marxist social thinkers. She began teaching urban sociology just as the “new urban sociology” was emerging, partly in response to a series of urban riots (many of which involved African-Americans reacting to police brutality or other manifestations of systemic racism) that took place in U.S. cities in the late 1960s. Widespread urban unrest in the U.S. and Europe prompted worried governments and agencies to increase the funding for urban research. Sociologist Manuel Castells and geographer David Harvey were two of the theorists influential in developing the new urban sociology.

Zukin's view, at least in 1980, was that “For most of their history, urban sociologists seemed to serve the interests of the state as much as industrial sociologists served the interests of capital.” She and other sociologists influenced by the new urban sociology intended to take a different course. In contrast to the prevailing Chicago School and its ethnographic focus on communities, immigrants and settlement patterns, practitioners of this new, more interdisciplinary approach were concerned with the role of the state and with analyzing how "urban space is produced deliberately and in response to the needs of capital."

=== Contributions ===
Zukin's research and publications focus on cities, how they change and why, culture (especially consumer culture and art markets) and real estate markets, particularly in New York City. Her books trace how cities have been reshaped through deindustrialization, gentrification, immigration, and innovation. She also writes about the rise of the symbolic economy, which is based on cultural production and consumption.

==== Loft Living ====
Her first urban book, Loft Living (1982, 1989), is considered groundbreaking. In their 2013 book Gentrification, Loretta Lees, Tom Slater and Elvin Wyly call Loft Living the most influential study of the development of “loft identity” and praise Zukin for developing the concept of the “artistic mode of production.” This refers to the way in which major local elites and investors have tried to use artists and culture industries to attract capital and stabilize precarious real estate markets.

==== Authenticity ====
In her most translated book, Naked City (2010), Zukin develops the concept of authenticity, the roots of which she traces back to ideas about an authentic self (meaning a self that is close to nature) found in Shakespeare and in the Romantic philosophy of Jean-Jacques Rousseau. More recently, she says a craving for authenticity developed as a reaction to the modernist standardization and homogenization of cities that took place in the 1950s and '60s.

While Zukin understands the craving for the authentic and admits to acting on it herself, she says the problem is that instead of being attributed to people, authenticity is now understood as an attribute of things (such as beer and cheese) and even experiences, which can be consumed. This leads to authenticity being "used as a lever of cultural power for a group to claim space and take it away from others without direct confrontation, with the help of the state and elected officials and the persuasion of the media and consumer culture." Through these processes of displacement and gentrification, she argues, New York City "lost its soul" in the early 21st century. The solution she proposes is to redefine authenticity and connect it back to the idea of "origins," then use it to support "the right to inhabit a space, not just consume it as an experience." Nodding to Henri Lefebvre and David Harvey's "right to the city" concept, she argues that "authenticity can suggest a 'right to the city,' a human right, that is cultivated by longtime residence, use, and habit.”

==== Praise and criticism of Jane Jacobs ====
While Zukin is often called a critic of the work of Jane Jacobs, she is also an admirer. Zukin has called Jacobs “the iconic urban writer, against whom other urban writers must measure themselves” and “the person who, against all odds in the mid-twentieth century, extolled the messiness, the grittiness, the tentativeness, but also the firm friendships of city life.” Zukin categorizes Jacobs, like Herbert Gans, as a “socially conscious intellectual” who “defended the right of poor people not to be displaced.” But Zukin differs from Jacobs in whom she considers the main antagonists when it comes to creating livable, equitable cities. Especially in her book The Death and Life of Great American Cities, Jacobs blames planners and the planning profession for destroying healthy, functional neighborhoods through forced urban renewal programs and for generally inflicting a "Great Blight of Dullness." Zukin sees this focus on planners as largely misguided and unhelpful because for her, planners are “a relatively powerless group compared to developers who build, and banks and insurance companies who finance the building that rips out a city's heart.” But “for one reason or another,” Zukin writes, Jacobs “chose not to criticize the interests of capitalist developers who profit from displacing others.” Zukin also parts company from Jacobs on the role of the state. Jacobs was communitarian, according to Zukin, looking to the community rather than the state for solutions to social problems. Zukin, on the other hand, is a strong believer in the need for government to promote and protect equity measures, saying, “I can't emphasize enough how important laws are, zoning laws, rent controls, commercial rent controls”.

==== The Innovation Complex ====
Zukin's recent book The Innovation Complex traces the emergence of the urban tech economy in the 2010s, relating it to the efforts of local governments to find a new growth engine after the 2008 financial crisis as well as to the rise of software, the increased importance of mobile apps, and tech companies’ decisions to locate near young people who were both producers and users of new digital technology. Although these processes have led to the construction of an idealized “innovation complex” in many cities around the world, the book shows in detail how these developments were carried out in New York and what they mean for the city's historical diversity.

== Selected awards ==
Jane Jacobs Urban Communication Award for Naked City, Urban Communication Foundation (2012)

Robert and Helen Lynd Award for Career Achievement in Urban Sociology from the Community and Urban Sociology section of the American Sociological Association. (2007)

C. Wright Mills Award from the Society for the Study of Social Problems for Landscapes of Power (1991)

== Selected works ==
- Beyond Marx and Tito (Cambridge University Press, 1975)
- Loft Living: Culture and Capital in Urban Change (Johns Hopkins University Press, 1982, rev. ed. Rutgers University Press, 1989)
- Landscapes of Power: From Detroit to Disney World (University of California Press, 1991)
- The Cultures of Cities (Blackwell, 1995)
- Point of Purchase : How Shopping Changed American Culture (Routledge, 2004)
- Naked City: The Death and Life of Authentic Urban Places (Oxford University Press, 2010)
- The Innovation Complex: Cities, Tech, and the New Economy (Oxford University Press, 2020)

Edited books:

- Industrial Policy: Business and Politics in the United States and France (Praeger, 1985)
- Structures of Capital (with Paul DiMaggio, Cambridge University Press, 1990)
- After the World Trade Center (with Michael Sorkin, Routledge, 2002)
- Global Cities, Local Streets: Everyday Diversity From New York to Shanghai (with Philip Kasinitz and Xiangming Chen, Routledge, 2016)

=== Education ===
AB (Bachelor of Arts), Barnard College, 1967

PhD, Columbia University, Political Science, 1972

== See also ==
- Greenwich Village
- Loft
- Real estate
- Soho
- The City as a Growth Machine (theory)
