= Mixed-income housing =

Type of housing development

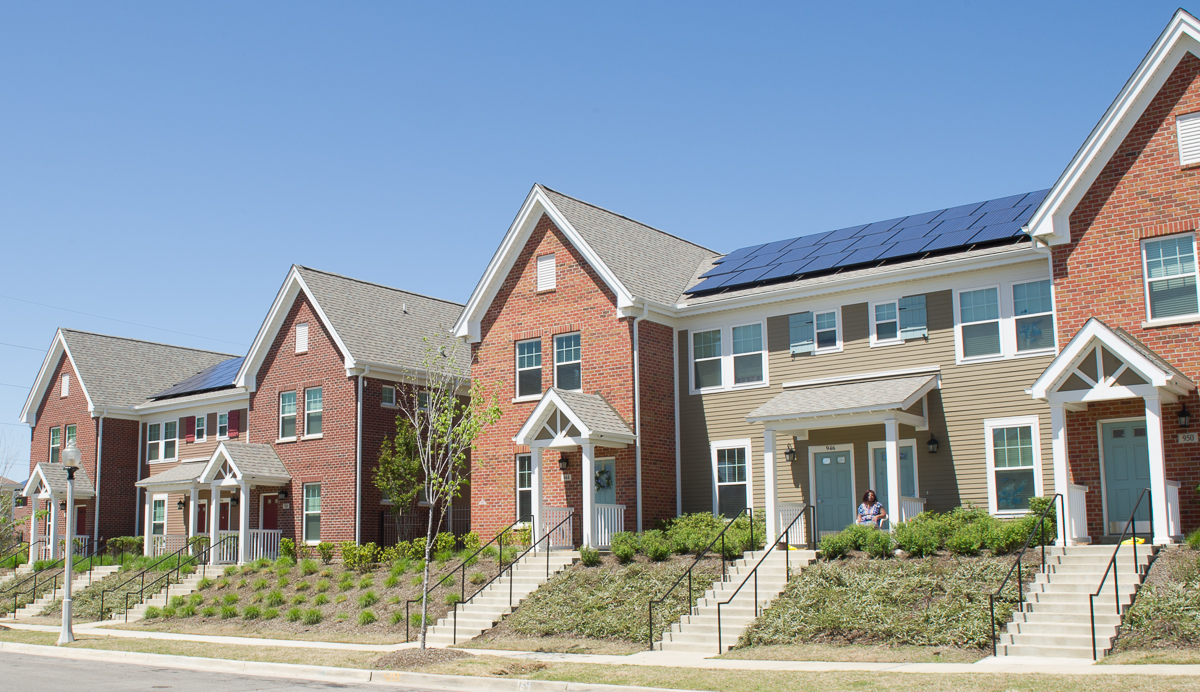
Legends Park West is a mixed-income and affordable housing development located in Memphis, Tennessee.

The definition of mixed-income housing is broad and encompasses many types of dwellings and neighborhoods. Following Brophy and Smith, the following will discuss “non-organic” examples of mixed-income housing, meaning “a deliberate effort to construct and/or own a multifamily development that has the mixing of income groups as a fundamental part of its financial and operating plans” A new, constructed mixed-income housing development includes diverse types of housing units, such as apartments, town homes, and/or single-family homes for people with a range of income levels. Mixed-income housing may include housing that is priced based on the dominant housing market (market-rate units) with only a few units priced for lower-income residents, or it may not include any market-rate units and be built exclusively for low- and moderate-income residents. Calculating Area Median Income (AMI) and pricing units at certain percentages of AMI most often determine the income mix of a mixed-income housing development. Mixed-income housing is one of two primary mechanisms to eliminate neighborhoods of concentrated poverty, combat residential segregation, and avoid the building of public housing that offers 100% of its housing units to those living in poverty. Mixed-income housing is built through federal-, state-, and local-level efforts and through a combination of public-private-non-profit partnerships.

== Overview ==
=== Definition ===
The definition of mixed income housing is broad and encompasses many types of dwellings and neighborhoods. Generally speaking, a mixed income housing development includes diverse types of housing units, such as apartments, townhomes, and/or single-family homes for a people with a range of income levels. Mixed income housing may include housing that is priced based on the dominant housing market (market-rate units) with only a few units priced for lower-income residents, or it may not include any market-rate units and be built exclusively for low- and moderate-income residents.

In the field of housing, there exists no single definition of mixed income housing or a mixed income neighborhood. Berube argues that mixed income housing mirrors an organic process in urban America, and that most often “most mixed-income environments do not result from new housing construction, but instead arise organically from migration, income, and household changes at the neighborhood level.” The level of organic economic integration in neighborhoods is contested, however, particularly given significant discrimination against minorities (particularly African Americans) in housing location decisions. There exists no clear metric to determine a neighborhood as "mixed income." This article will focus on non-organic mixed income developments that are built as part of a particular policy intervention.

Mixed income housing is one of two primary mechanisms to eliminate neighborhoods of concentrated poverty, combat residential segregation, and avoid the building of public housing that offers 100% of its housing units to those living in poverty. Mixed income housing development is a project-based subsidy, that is the subsidy is tied to the housing unit, not the tenant, while tenant-based assistance, such as Section 8 (housing) comes in the form of vouchers, which provide a housing subsidy that individuals can use on the open market and move to neighborhoods where landlords will take the voucher subsidy as rent payment. Calculating Area Median Income (AMI) and pricing units at certain percentages of AMI most often determine the income mix of a mixed income housing development.

=== How mixed income housing gets built ===
Mixed income housing developments are built through a number of mechanisms. Schwartz and Tajbakhsh have identified four main avenues for the development of mixed income housing.

- State and local governments use density bonuses, inclusionary zoning policies, and other land use regulations to require and/or encourage housing developers to build a certain percentage of new housing units at a particular level of affordability. For example, inclusionary zoning will require developers to build a certain percentage (often 10-20%) of new units for low-income families. Density bonuses serve as an incentive, and offer developers the opportunity to build higher density buildings than they would be allowed under normal zoning regulations if they build new units at a certain level of affordability.
- Public housing authorities across the country have used the federal HOPE VI program to rehabilitate distressed public housing and revitalize surrounding neighborhoods by building mixed income housing developments.
- Some state and local housing finance programs offer incentives or have prerequisites for certain levels of affordability, such as in Massachusetts and New York
- Private developers and/or non-profit community development corporations build some mixed income housing. Diverse tax credits, tax abatement programs, and funding streams available from local, state, and federal governments support them.

== History ==
The promotion of safe and adequate housing has persisted since the late 1800s in the United States, when early interventions focused on tenement reforms. These efforts were primarily the purview of local governments, however, and the federal government did not enter into housing questions until 1937 when Congress passed the Wagner-Steagall Housing Act, which launched the federal public housing program that still exists today. Historically, public housing authorities sought to achieve the goals that efforts of mixed income housing developments seek today, including the mixing of diverse residents, improved neighborhood services, and creating a ladder out of public housing.

Mixed income housing started to emerge in the mid-1960s and 1970s with some federal programs and when local jurisdictions initiated inclusionary zoning. In 1983, the New Jersey State Supreme Court determined that the inclusion of affordable housing would satisfy a municipality’s state constitutional obligations to house the poor, and then in 1986, U.S. Congress authorized the Low Income Housing Tax Credit (LIHTC) program, which provided a tax credit to private developers who included affordable housing in their developments. As evidenced by the LIHTC passage, mixed income housing became a popular policy strategy in the 1980s and 90s in an effort to de-concentrate poverty and redevelop urban neighborhoods. The 1992 the HOPE VI program emerged as the pinnacle of this interest.

With rising poverty rates and increased concentration of poverty in inner city neighborhoods in the 1970s and 80s, mixed income housing captured the imagination of federal policy makers. While the federal government, and specifically the Department of Housing and Urban Development (HUD), had ongoing housing programs, the beginning of the Bill Clinton administration brought renewed attention to the housing needs of the poor.

Three specific movements and sets of scholarship converged to influence HUD's specific strategies, policies, and programs: the scholarship of William Julius Wilson in his book, The Truly Disadvantaged: The Inner City, the Underclass, and Public Policy; the National Commission on Severely Distressed Public Housing report that called for a significant portion of the nation’s public housing be repaired; and the emergence of New Urbanism. Over time, incremental federal policy set the stage for the mixed income housing developments today.

=== William Julius Wilson and "The Truly Disadvantaged" ===
In 1987, a prominent scholar William Julius Wilson in his book "The Truly Disadvantaged: The Inner City, the Underclass, and Public Policy," outlined the problems for those living in neighborhoods of concentrated poverty. Wilson highlights the prevalence of violence out-of-wedlock births, female-headed households, and welfare dependency in inner-city neighborhoods, and the lack of role models with sustainable jobs and advanced education. He also draws connections between these problems and the restructuring of the urban economy and changes in the family and community structure of inner city communities. The deindustrialization of the urban economy and a shift to service sector jobs, have left those without a college degree at a marked disadvantage facing unemployment with little opportunity for additional education. Wilson aims to connect the plight of those living in the inner city to larger macro-economic forces and calls for public policy interventions that impact the economic organization of the United States. Wilson uses the term underclass to describe those living in the inner city, and identifies a set of “collective differences in behavior and outlook” that constitute a specific culture. Since Oscar Lewis identified a culture of poverty in his seminal 1959 work, scholars have grappled with whether those living in poverty exhibit distinctive characteristics as a subculture or simply demonstrate adaptive coping mechanisms given their situation. Wilson’s bridging of the culture of poverty with macro-economic structures offered a new framework; he also called for “a comprehensive program that combines employment policies with social welfare policies.”

=== The National Commission on Severely Distressed Public Housing ===
In 1992, the National Commission on Severely Distressed Public Housing published a report to Congress and the Secretary of the Department of Housing and Urban Development that detailed the state of public housing. The report called for the demolition and/or rehabilitation of public housing sites across the country. The negative impacts of living such distressed and segregated public housing were further highlighted in a seminal book called American Apartheid. Massey and Denton highlighted the hypersegregation of African-Americans in the inner city in America, traced the roots of the underclass to residential segregation, facilitated by federal policies of suburbanization through mortgage subsidies, highway construction, urban renewal, and public housing construction. Massey and Denton’s work tied questions of housing and federal housing policy directly to poverty alleviation and the elimination of the underclass.

=== Congress for New Urbanism ===
The same year that American Apartheid was published, the Congress for New Urbanism was founded. The Congress for New Urbanism “advocates the restructuring of public policy and development practices to support the restoration of existing urban centers and towns within coherent metropolitan regions.” As an urban design movement, New Urbanism seeks to develop vibrant, walkable, and connected communities, based on traditional neighborhood structures, street layout, and architectural design. This design and planning strategy stands in direct opposition to both sprawled suburban development and large high-rise towers of public housing.

The convergence of this scholarship, national need, and new planning paradigm resulted in the federal HOPE VI program (among other policy mechanisms). While HOPE VI is the most well known federally funded mixed income effort, the following describes the theory of how mixed income housing works as poverty alleviation, regardless of funding and/or management structure.

== Neighborhood effects, poverty alleviation, and housing ==
Housing is seen as a key stabilizing force for those living in poverty, particularly as the challenges of living in neighborhoods of concentrated poverty have become increasingly well documented. Neighborhoods of concentrated poverty suffer from lack of investment in both the physical infrastructure and human resources. Empirical research has shown that living in poor, inner-city neighborhoods results in lower levels of educational attainment, higher participation in criminal activities and other anti-social behavior, more negative health outcomes, more exposure to violence, higher likelihood of teenage pregnancy, and social isolation from good-paying work; in other words – place matters. As the Kirwan Institute highlights, “Neighborhood racial and economic segregation is segregation from opportunities critical to quality of life, financial stability, and social advancement.”

This impact of place has come to be known as "neighborhood effects," and scholars continue to grapple with the specific ways that neighborhood impact life outcomes. Family, peer, and neighborhood influences are entangled and difficult to empirically analyze in isolation. Ellen and Turner conducted an exhaustive review of theoretical and empirical work (as of 1997 publication) on “neighborhood effects” and developed a framework that identifies six mechanisms by which neighborhood influences individual outcomes:

1. quality of local services

2. socialization by adults

3. peer influences

4. social networks

5. exposure to crime and violence

6. physical distance and isolation

They draw on the seminal work of sociologist William Julius Wilson and describe the ways that adults serve as role models for children and youth through demonstrating work skills and the value of education. Choice of peer group is often influenced where you live. Likewise, social networks that provide emotional support and/or facilitate word-of-mouth information about jobs and other opportunities may be neighborhood based.

Those who live in neighborhoods with high incidences of crime and violence are more likely to be victims of this crime, and also may suffer trauma from living in a heightened state of stress. Regular exposure to violence also makes violent behavior seem normal for youth.

Finally, living in segregated neighborhoods geographically isolates residents from employment opportunities.

=== Shortcomings ===
Proving neighborhood effects and the positive impact of new housing is very difficult. First, studies are looking at people over time and there are great differences between impacts on young children, adolescents, and adults. Impacts on females and males may also differ. Research also suffers from issues of selection bias. Next, researchers can not clearly isolate what causes what given the very dynamic combination of people and institutions and individuals' development. Finally, researchers can not agree on the definition of neighborhood, which makes it hard to compare across study.

These methodological challenges lead to variable empirical findings thus may offer “scant guidance for policy makers" who lack clarity on the specific causal relationships between particular neighborhood characteristics and individual outcomes over time. Five potential strategies for addressing these challenges include:

"1. redefining neighborhood boundaries in ways that are more consonant with social interactions and children’s experiences,

2. collecting data on the physical and social properties of neighborhood environments through systematic social observations,

3. taking account of spatial interdependence among neighborhoods,

4. analyzing the dynamics of change in neighborhood social processes, and

5. collecting benchmark data on neighborhood social processes."

== Purpose: A framework for mixed income housing as poverty alleviation ==
While Wilson highlighted the macroeconomic forces at the root of joblessness and urban poverty, mixed income housing as a market-based strategy, seeks to address residential segregation as describe by Massey and Denton, and by extension address the “cultural” explanations of persistent poverty, not these larger structural forces related to employment and wages. Proponents of mixed income housing suggest that building mixed income housing can improve the neighborhood and also support lower income residents by changing anti-social behaviors to pro-social ones.

There are four proposed mechanisms by which mixed income housing serves as a poverty alleviation strategy: (1) social networks, (2) social control, (3) behavioral modification, (4) political economy of place. These elements link to Ellen & Turner’s six ways that the neighborhood influences individuals’ life outcomes.

- Social networks: Through interaction with residents of other incomes, mixed income housing will provide lower income residents with new social networks, enhanced social capital, and access to new networks for employment. Based on theories of social capital, this notion suggests that residents will acquire additional social capital, which links them to people outside of their immediate social circle and thus may experience increased opportunities for employment.
- Social control: Higher income residents will call for an increased level of accountability around particular rules and norms in the neighborhood, yielding more order and safety.
- Behavioral modification: Higher income residents will serve as role models for lower income residents around home ownership, work ethic, and other individual actions.
- Political economy of place: The mere presence of higher income residents will bring in additional and higher quality services and amenities that were previously not available because of market forces and/or political power.

Others highlight that mixed income housing also serves to improve neighborhoods and catalyze additional private investments and real estate development in otherwise neglected areas of a city. Vale, citing Marcuse articulates a tri-fold goal of neighborhood revitalization, better housing quality, and support of low-income residents. He also comments that the way policies are structured seem to privilege the private investment in neighborhoods, as policy makers implicitly ask “What, politically speaking, is the minimum number of very low income households that need to be accommodated to make redevelopment financially appealing to private developers and investors?”

== In the international context ==
Many countries also engage in mixed income housing strategies. Research draws attention to explicit policy goals of neighborhood diversification in the Netherlands, the United Kingdom, France, Germany, Sweden, and Finland.

The goals and type of mixing vary by country. For example, the United Kingdom is more focused on tenure mix - that is the number of owners and renters - as opposed to a greater focus on income mixing. This tenure mix presumably works in ways similar to mixed income housing the U.S. It provides a housing ladder for renters to move up, which also creates stability by allowing for changes in residential preferences by offering renters to move to owning without having to leave the neighborhood. Further, "upwardly mobile residents moving or buying within the same area are considered as potential role models." Mixed tenure may improve problems of turnover and vacancy where there is less demand for public housing. Mixed tenure also serves to deconcentrate poverty. Increased numbers of homeowners also increases residents' financial stake in a neighborhood which can have ancillary benefits. In the Netherlands, the attention is often on mixing incomes in rental units, with the goals of providing a housing ladder in the neighborhood and encouraging middle- and higher-income residents to stay in the city.

Research from these countries emphasizes both dynamics of the housing market (providing people with a housing ladder) and the goals of social cohesion and role modeling. Particularly in the United Kingdom and the Netherlands, policy has specifically distanced itself from social engineering, staying focused on issues of the housing market. Like the United States, the exact causal model of how mixed income or mixed tenure housing will impact individuals and/or the housing market are not clear and require further study.

Similar to the United States, research has found that social mixing is limited across income groups and tenure types, but that the stigma of living in “public housing” is reduced. Benefits to the physical environment are demonstrable. Overall, the research from abroad reinforces the findings from the United States experience: mixed income housing provides an important level of stability for low-income residents, but is not sufficient to lift people out of poverty in the absence of additional support systems.

== Success ==
=== Necessary pre-conditions ===
In cases where mixed income housing developments require bringing in higher income residents to inner city neighborhoods, success depends on certain conditions, including desirability of location, design and condition of development, management and maintenance, and financial viability. Schwartz & Tajbakhsh also identify “racial and ethnic composition of the development and the surrounding neighborhood and the state of the regional housing market” as important preconditions. A tighter housing market helps attract residents who in a weaker housing market may have more choices and can be pickier about their location and neighbor choice. Gray highlights the importance of the perceptions of a particular neighborhood in attracting middle-income residents. A number of factors should be taken into account:

1. To ensure day-to-day needs are taken care of and the development is well-maintained, good management is critical.

2. To support the upward mobility of the low-income residents, income-mixing and good management needs to be coupled with other support services to assist low-income residents in their professional life.

3. To meet the goals of mixed income housing - specifically to deconcentrate poverty - a sufficient number of units must be aimed at the higher income population to create a critical mass.

4. Mixed-income housing works best when the income mix is not emphasized in marketing. Additionally, all units should have the same amenities and be of the same quality.

5. To integrate a singular housing project by income is much easier than in a neighborhood.

6. Attention to not only income mix but also tenure mix is important. The mix of owners and renters, and the range of incomes in different type of rental units matters to effective management and integration.

=== Assessment in the United States ===
The multifold goals of mixed income housing make assessing success a challenging endeavor. First and foremost, researchers and policymakers need better clarity around the goals so that they can develop good measures of success for mixed income developments and neighborhoods. Otherwise, as Joseph, et al. comments, “policy implementation has gotten well ahead of conceptual clarity and empirical justification.”

==== Benefits ====
A few benefits are evident today.

First, by measure of creating and/or maintaining an affordable housing stock in the United States, mixed income housing can be considered a success. Mixed income housing developments are a more politically palatable option to housing lower income members of society, particularly in communities with deep resistance to building affordable housing or having public housing relocated through a scattered sites policy. Therefore, mixed income housing as a policy strategy has taken hold in the United States not because it is expected to alleviate poverty, but rather because of many ancillary benefits that accrue to the neighborhood, city, and all residents.

Second, many projects successfully have people of diverse income groups living adjacent, which is facilitated by good location, design, and management.

Third, the benefits for neighborhood revitalization are demonstrable – housing quality improves, crime decreases, property values and tax bases increase, and public goods and services are enhanced. Likewise, mixed income housing in stable neighborhoods offer access to safer communities and potentially higher quality schools.

==== Questions of efficacy ====
Ultimately housing is an important starting point, but not sufficient to lift people out of poverty; additional support programming, job training, and other social services are needed to achieve these broader goals.

===== Poverty alleviation =====
As a market-based approach, mixed income housing has been less successful improving outcomes for lower income residents, and rather demonstrate more benefits at the neighborhood level. As Brophy & Smith articulate, the goals of “upward mobility of lower income residents” require additional programming, job training, and social service intervention; these services are not necessarily part and parcel of all mixed income developments. Rosenbaum, et al. have found in their evaluation of one specific project, Lake Parc Place in Chicago, that success is demonstrated through well-managed buildings and a mix of incomes in their residents; the project has not seen increased employment and improved public safety, however.

Further, many mixed income housing projects that are part of public housing revitalization efforts do not offer a one-to-one replacement rate on the units, causing some public housing residents to be displaced. In this way, mixed income housing serves not as poverty alleviation, but rather as way to move poverty around. Most often, those displaced include the hardest-to-house, that require the most intensive services due to substance abuse, mental health issues, criminal backgrounds, physical disability, or complicated family and childcare structures. In this way, mixed income housing developments may just be moving problems around a metropolitan area and not actually lifting people out of poverty or offering them more opportunity. As Fraser & Nelson ask, “Are we satisfied with moving poverty around cities and metropolitan areas, or can we develop innovative and geographically informed community-based approaches for the integration of housing needs with other domain areas that affect our quality of life?” Further, many mixed income housing developments have strict regulations and background checks for new residents, making some of the hardest-to-house without options to move back into the community.

===== Social networks, control, and cohesion =====
Joseph finds limited and inconclusive evidence on enhanced social networks. Evidence for increased social control is inconclusive, but compelling; there remains question as to the cause of social control – good management or the income mix of neighbors. Given the controversial scholarship of culture of poverty, measuring changes in behavior or norms through role modeling is rather difficult. Joseph calls into serious question the notion that role modeling from middle-income people is a valid goal/outcome of mixed income housing. Finally, the improvements brought by higher income residents’ political clout have not borne out empirically, but remain compelling given greater “participation in community organizations, likelihood of voting, and spending power.". The level of social cohesion and meaningful interaction in these new mixed income neighborhoods is an open question to achieving these broader goals of building social capital.

===== Cost efficiency =====
In addition to questions about the empirical evidence for social benefits of lifting people out of poverty, some criticize mixed income housing developments as too costly and not the most economically efficient way to de-concentrate poverty. Some argue that tenant-based housing vouchers offer greater possibility for social integration and cost less than project-based mixed income housing endeavors. According to Ellickson, “most housing economists…assert that, as a general matter, portable tenant-based subsidies are markedly more efficient and fairer than project-based subsidies.” Further, Ellickson argues that the goals of economic integration are better suited to a neighborhood, rather than project level scale, which would suggest that tenant-based subsidies would provide more opportunities for moving people out of neighborhoods of concentrated poverty and for building social contacts beyond their immediate circles.

Ellickson contends that mixed income housing projects are economically inefficient: “Housing economists have consistently found that, all else equal, the development of housing units in subsidized projects, whether publicly or privately sponsored, costs significantly more than the development of unsubsidized units.” Likewise, Schwartz suggests that further research is needed to understand if it is cheaper to build and subsidize mixed income housing developments than other forms of subsidy. Mixed income housing developments can also cost more in terms of time and effort from developers and local governments. Because funding comes from diverse sources, developer-permitting applications are more complex. Further, new affordable housing development can raise concerns among existing residents, which at times can also slow progress. Ellen & Turner also echo concerns about scale in their review of “neighborhood effects” research, commenting that researchers “may not measure relevant neighborhood conditions accurately if they are unable to define the relevant neighborhood boundaries.” Thus, measuring the success of a singular mixed income project may not be the right scale, and understanding the impacts of the development on the neighborhood poses its own methodological challenges.

== Criticism and controversy ==
Some of the above questions are part of serious debate and controversy.

First, mixed income housing is a market-based approach, achieved through public-private partnerships characteristic of neoliberalism. Some have argued that this is a devolution of the government, as the private sector is now providing a service of the public sector, which will hinder the ability to serve those most in need.

Second, when mixed income housing projects are part of public housing revitalization, they do not always offer a one-to-one replacement rate on the units, causing some public housing residents to be displaced.

Third, the notion that role modeling by upper income residents should improve behaviors of lower income residents may be grounded in assumptions around a culture of poverty, which asserts that those living in poverty actually have an alternative value system, separate from mainstream, middle- and upper-class values. This concept is very contested and thus some question whether this type of outcome is a valid goal for mixed income housing.

== Directions for policy and research ==
The questions that research and case studies raise suggest a few directions for future research.

=== Planning and design ===
Policy makers must clearly articulate their goals for a particular project and clarify by what metric they will measure success. Also, measuring impacts along short, medium, and long-term measures is important to fully understand the life cycle of a development or neighborhood and its residents.

Prior to choosing sites and/or implementation, good analysis on financial feasibility, neighborhood characteristics, and potential market demand for goods, services, and amenities would be necessary. Also understanding the potential impacts on communities receiving new affordable housing and the concerns of residents living there, if any, is important to integrate new lower income residents smoothly and to ensure that they maintain their rights as residents in this new community.

In planning a development site, the income mix is a key issue; understanding what kind of income mix – both the “spread” of mix (super low-, low-, moderate-, and/or high-income) and the number of units per income level – is necessary for particular results. Sometimes, a narrower gap between income levels may foster greater interaction and promote social cohesion. In cases where mixed income housing is renovating public housing, decisions about replacement of public housing units is critical. Further, the type of unit mix – singles, families, etc. – is an important factor in promoting social cohesion, as “the gaps between very low income transit-dependent long-term public housing tenants with children versus childless auto-equipped transient households with market-rate apartments or owned homes may simply be too vast for any form of social capital to bridge.”

Architectural and urban design elements can enable or inhibit a feeling of social cohesion, and so carefully choosing design elements that match the goals of mixed income development are key. Some of these may include placing higher income and lower income units adjacent to each other; ensuring that all units have the same features, amenities and aesthetic; and providing accessible common space.

=== Community empowerment ===
In both planning and ongoing management, broad community empowerment and participation is key, across all income levels of residents. Fraser & Nelson recommend community empowerment to accompany mixed income housing developments, in large part to help foster neighborhood relations, identify key assets and needs of the community, and ultimately to maximize the “neighborhood effects” of the new development. Vale also suggests that empowering lower income residents to meaningfully engage in the management of their developments can help foster positive outcomes for individuals and the neighborhood as a whole through formal and informal social controls. Community engagement can be fostered or inhibited by certain design elements; creating central, shared community spaces with interesting programming may be one way to provide opportunities for mingling and socialization among diverse residents. Duke suggests that participation is about more than just developing positive outcomes for integrated communities; participation and the ability to effect change in a place is fundamental to The Right to the City that needs to be protected. Physical integration is not enough to ensure that lower income residents have as much control over management, maintenance, and subsequent transformation – other programmatic or governance structures may be needed as well: “If any true transformation and integration is to occur in mixed income housing, marginalized groups would have to be involved in the process of relocation and have infrastructure in place for participation."

=== Poverty alleviation ===
While the growing body of literature suggests that economically diverse and integrated neighborhoods support residents’ opportunities and life chances, more research is needed to understand the mechanisms by which this happens. Joseph begins to examine this in the case of Chicago, and further qualitative research could examine dynamics of neighbor interactions, level of social ties and integration, amount and quality of services, and lived experiences of the lowest income residents. Additional research is also needed on ways to overcome NIMBY attitudes as a way to achieve meaningful social integration. While mixed income housing offers one strategy for moving people out of neighborhoods of concentrated poverty, the underlying causes of poverty and segregation, such as issues of discrimination and labor market dynamics are not addressed. Finally, better comparative research on unit-based housing subsidy, such as mixed income housing, and tenant-based subsidy (such as the Moving to Opportunity program, Section 8 housing vouchers, etc.) could assess the financial efficiency and social efficacy of these respective strategies for de-concentration of poverty to determine the best continued policy strategy and public investment.

== See also ==
- Concentrated poverty
- Section 8 (housing)
- Public housing
- HOPE VI
- Subsidized housing
- McCormack Baron Salazar
