= James Rosenbaum =

American sociologist

James E. Rosenbaum
- Born: December 1943 (age 82)
- Education: Yale University; Harvard University
- Known for: Gautreaux Project
- Scientific career
- Fields: Sociology of Education
- Workplaces: Yale University; Northwestern University
- Doctoral advisor: Lee Rainwater

James E. Rosenbaum (born December 1943), is a Professor of Sociology, Education, and Social Policy at Northwestern University.

He is most well known for his study of the Gautreaux Project the Chicago housing desegregation program which led to the federal Moving to Opportunity program, and for his work on improving vocational education programs.

== Gautreaux ==
The Gautreaux project is notable for being one of the few bipartisan social programs based in a randomized experiment. The Reagan, Bush, and Clinton administrations lauded the program's dramatic results on the lives of its participants, and used it as a model for housing projects nationwide; it has been featured on Oprah, the Today Show and in major publications such as the New York Times and the Economist.

The Gautreaux project was an experiment in which 7000 black families on welfare were given the chance to move to either suburban or urban locations. The Chicago Housing Authority designated a day on which Section 8 vouchers are distributed to the first several hundred callers. Applicants were screened by two standards—basic apartment maintenance and lack of a serious criminal record—and two-thirds of the applicants were accepted. Successful applicants were offered placement in private market apartment units in either city or suburban locations chosen at random by the CHA, and most accepted the placement. The program was intentionally low-profile: only a few participants are moved into each suburb in order to prevent white flight, and because the residents moved into private units, they had no external markers of being on welfare.

The suburban and urban participants started out identical: all were selected from the same pool of callers, and were randomly placed into private apartments in either suburban or urban locations. After several years, the suburban and urban participants had very different outcomes. The urban participants were likely to remain on the welfare rolls, but their suburban counterparts were very likely to find employment and leave welfare. The urban participants' children were likely to drop out of high school, but their suburban counterparts are likely to graduate from high school and even college. In fact, Rosenbaum relates that he met the daughter of a Gautreaux participant attending Northwestern University, where he teaches.

The Gautreaux project has become a model for similar programs in Boston, Cincinnati, Dallas and Hartford, Conn., and inspired the national MTO program in five U.S. cities.

== School-to-work transition ==
Rosenbaum has studied the incentives for students to work hard in high school, and how these incentives translate into post-high school educational and employment outcomes.

=== Community colleges ===
Rosenbaum's surveys have found that students know that community colleges are open to all, and students say that they have little incentive to study. Due to the lack of incentives to study in high school, most community college students are required to enroll in remedial courses before beginning courses which give them college credit: after semesters of paying for remedial courses without earning any college credits, high numbers of students drop out with few or no college credits.

=== Vocational education ===
Rosenbaum has evaluated the adequacy and extent of American vocational education programs and compared them with successful models in other countries such as Japan and Germany. American schools are uncomfortable with creating a substantial vocational education system and instead offer a college-preparatory curriculum to nearly all students, which does not give all students the means to get a job.

Rosenbaum has surveyed work-bound high school students, and found that high school students know that employers don't look at high school grades, and so students say they have little incentive to study. Rosenbaum has studied model vocational education programs which give incentives to students to work hard: teachers develop relationships with employers and employers trust teachers' opinions of students, so students see that their performance in the classroom has a direct effect on their employability. Vocational education curriculum is clearly relevant to the real world, and students gain self-esteem from learning real world job skills such as auto mechanics or computer assembly. Students in vocational education programs also attain higher levels of competence at the same skills than they would in college preparatory courses.

== Publications ==
=== Books ===
- Making inequality: the hidden curriculum of high school tracking, 1976
- Career mobility in a corporate hierarchy, 1984
- Crossing the class and color lines: from public housing to white suburbia, University of Chicago press, 2000
- Beyond college for all: career paths for the forgotten half, Russell Sage Foundation, 2001
- After admission: from college access to college success, 2006
