= Gautreaux =

Gautreaux, also Gautreau, is a surname of French origin. Notable people with the surname include:

- Butch Gautreaux (1947-2020), American politician
- Dorothy Gautreaux, litigant in the U.S. Supreme Court case Hills v. Gautreaux
- Pierre Gautreau, husband of Virginie Amélie Avegno Gautreau
- Sid Gautreaux, catcher for the Brooklyn Dodgers baseball team
- Tim Gautreaux, Southeastern Louisiana University professor and American novelist
- Virginie Amélie Avegno Gautreau, Louisiana-born Parisien socialite known as "Madame X" from a portrait painting by John Singer Sargent

== See also ==
- Gautreaux Project
