= Gautreaux Project =

The Gautreaux Project is a US housing-desegregation project initiated by court order. It is notable both for being one of the only social programs based in a randomized experiment, and the only anti-poverty housing program endorsed by the Reagan, Bush, and Clinton administrations.

== Chronology ==
The ACLU-initiated 1966 class action lawsuit Dorothy Gautreaux v. Chicago Housing Authority (CHA) alleged that the CHA engaged in racial discrimination in public housing policy, as prohibited by the Civil Rights Act of 1964. The lawsuit alleged that the CHA built public housing solely in areas with high concentrations of poor minorities, in violation of the federal Department of Housing and Urban Development (HUD) guidelines and the Civil Rights Act. The goal of the lawsuit was to begin building public housing in predominantly white neighborhoods.

HUD entered as a party to the lawsuit, and the case went to the U.S. Supreme Court in 1976 as Hills v. Gautreaux (425 U.S. 284).

In a consent decree, the court ordered the CHA to provide scattered-site housing for public housing residents currently residing in isolated public housing projects in concentrated areas of poverty.

The CHA distributed Section 8 housing vouchers to 7500 African American families on welfare in either suburban or urban locations. The Chicago Housing Authority designated a day on which Section 8 vouchers were distributed to the first several hundred callers. Applicants were screened by two standards—basic apartment maintenance and lack of a serious criminal record—and two-thirds of the applicants were accepted. Successful applicants were offered placement in private market apartment units in either city or suburban locations chosen at random by the CHA, and most accepted the placement. The program was intentionally low-profile: only a few participants were moved into each suburb in order to prevent white flight, and because the residents moved into private units, they had no external markers of being on welfare.

== Results ==
The suburban and urban participants started out identical: all were selected from the same pool of callers, and were randomly placed into private apartments in either suburban or urban locations. After several years, the suburban and urban participants had very different outcomes. The urban participants were likely to remain on the welfare rolls, but their suburban counterparts were very likely to find employment and leave welfare. The urban participants' children were likely to drop out of high school, but their suburban counterparts are likely to graduate from high school and even college. The program participants' children were initially below the academic level of their classmates, but because only a few families were moved to each suburbs, the suburban teachers could take time with each new child and tutor each child individually until the children were at the same level as their classmates.

The sociologist James Rosenbaum who studied the Gautreaux project testified before the US Congress on the success of the program, and it has become a model for similar programs in 33 metropolitan areas and inspired the national Moving to Opportunity (MTO) program.

Some housing departments misinterpreted the results of the Gautreaux project, and used it as justification for emptying and demolishing public housing, as a result of which thousands of public housing residents at a time moved to the same suburbs and overwhelmed the suburbs' resources with urban problems. Gautreaux intentionally moved only a few public housing residents to each suburb.
