= ULW =

ULW or ulw may refer to:

- Universal Living Wage (ULW), a project which was launched by Richard R. Troxell
- ulw, the ISO 639-3 code for Ulwa language, Nicaragua and Honduras
