= Concentrated poverty =

Concept in sociology

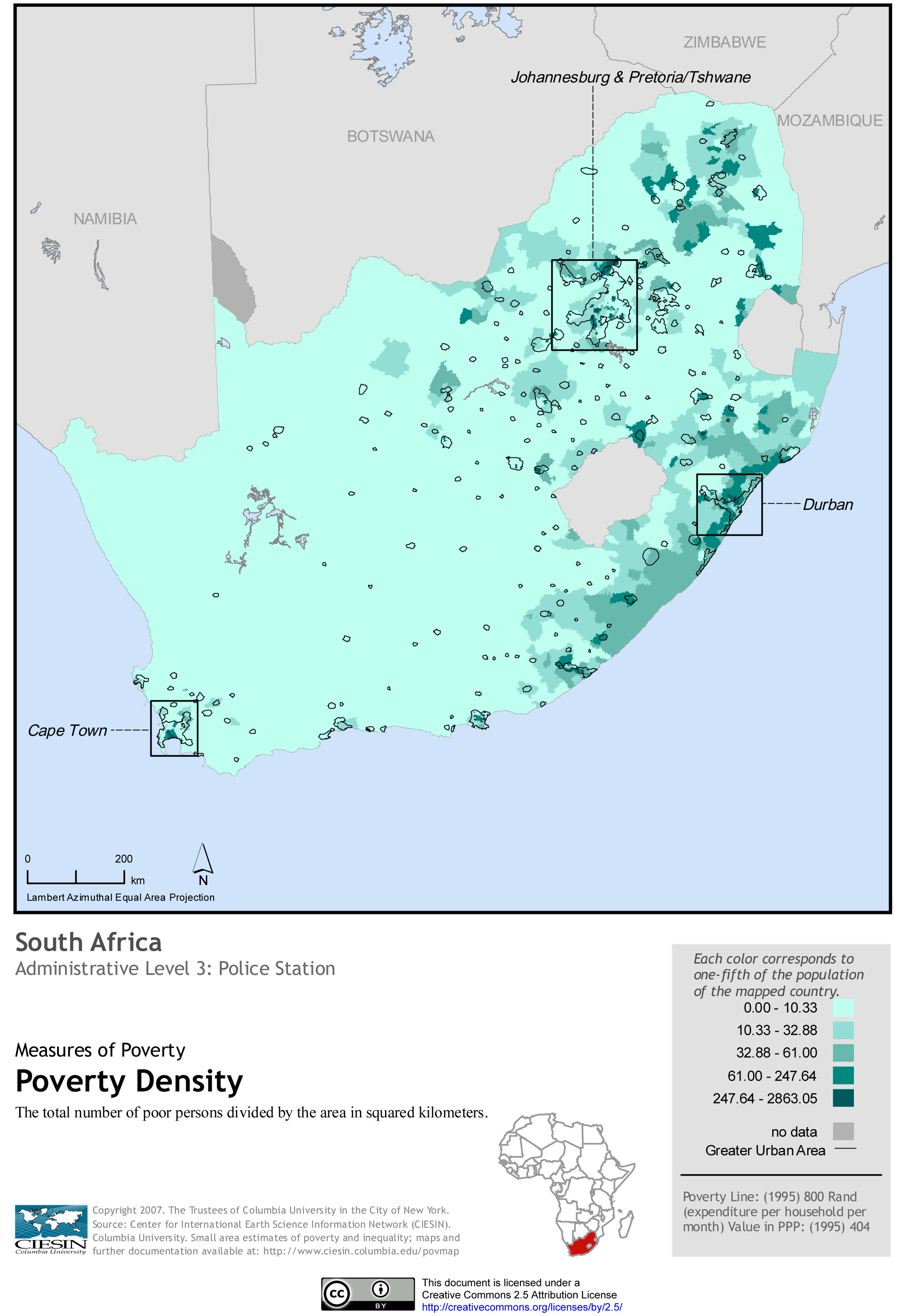
South African poverty density

Concentrated poverty concerns the spatial distribution of socio-economic deprivation, specifically focusing on the density of poor populations. Within the United States, common usage of the term concentrated poverty is observed in the fields of policy and scholarship referencing areas of "extreme" or "high-poverty." These are defined by the US census as areas where "40 percent of the tract population [lives] below the federal poverty threshold."

A large body of literature argues that areas of concentrated poverty place additional burdens on poor families residing within them, burdens beyond what these families' individual circumstances would dictate. Research also indicates that areas of concentrated poverty can have effects beyond the neighborhood in question, affecting surrounding neighborhoods not classified as "high-poverty" and subsequently limiting their overall economic potential and social cohesion.

Concentrated poverty is a global phenomenon, with prominent examples world-wide. Despite differing definitions, contributing factors, and overall effects, global concentrated poverty retains its central theme of spatial density. Multiple programs have attempted to ameliorate concentrated poverty and its effects within the United States, with varying degrees of progress and to sometimes detrimental effect.

== History in the United States ==
A long-standing issue, concentrated poverty creates distinct social problems, exacerbating individual impoverishment and standing as the grounds of reform movements and studies since the mid-19th century. An analytical conception and measure for concentrated emerged in the United States around the 1970s, sparked by concern for its inner cities following deindustrialization, late-1960s civil unrest, rapid suburbanization, and subsequent out-migration. Most inner-city areas of concentrated poverty contained predominantly minority populations, featuring expansive public housing developments. The Bureau of the Census developed the first definition of "low-income areas" as part of its work for the newly established Office of Economic Opportunity, an organization designed to administer President Lyndon B. Johnson's War on Poverty programs, part of his Great Society legislative agenda. Overall, these programs were intended to identify major poverty concentrations within large metropolitan areas. An attribute-based criterion formed the original definition, with census tracts ranked by the following:

1. Income
2. Average level of education
3. Number of single-parent households
4. Percentage of low-skilled workers
5. Quality of housing stock

Of these, the lowest quartile were designated "low income." Following the 1970 census, attribute-based measures were translated to purely statistical ones, defining "low-income areas" as census tracts with 20%–39% of inhabitants falling under the poverty line, and labeling areas with 40% or more impoverished inhabitants as "high" or "extreme" poverty. Calibration of household income statistics most closely approximating the 1960 census lower quartile lead to the adoption of the 20% threshold adopted in 1970. The 40% threshold designating "high-poverty" areas was set by doubling the low-income threshold, becoming the common definition of "concentrated poverty" in policy and scholarly research.

Paul Jargowsky later developed an alternative measure for concentrated poverty, used more specifically for larger geographical areas. His rate expresses the proportion of all poor individuals in a certain area (e.g., city, metropolitan region, or county) who live in census tracts of high poverty. Jargowsky further refined the concept of concentrated poverty to more specifically describe the "proportion of the poor in some region city or region that resides in high-poverty neighborhoods," as opposed to a simple territorial designation of high-poverty neighborhoods.

William Julius Wilson's book The Truly Disadvantaged: The Inner City, The Underclass, and Public Policy was the first major scholarly work utilizing the census measure to study changing spatial trends in poverty, as well as its causes and effects. According to his findings, tracts of concentrated poverty increased dramatically throughout metropolitan areas of the United States during the 1970s, alongside the population of poor people residing within them. These trends related specifically to an African American "underclass" in America's inner cities (see trends below). In this work, Wilson utilizes concentrated poverty as an analytic measure to gauge the changing spatial organization and intensification of poverty, as a territorial category to designate an object of analysis, and also as a causal factor in and of itself, effecting life chances among the poor. All three conceptualizations have since served as the basis for a wide range of social science research, as well as policy interventions and prescriptions.

=== Analytic measure ===
Wilson's study both set the precedent of using the census' 40% threshold and has been adopted as the standard measure for the study of poverty trends and poor neighborhoods. Its standardization is largely credited to the measure's convenience, as opposed to any conceptual justifications, and is employed to compare degrees of poverty concentration between areas, as well as the growth or decline in total number of tracts fitting such qualifications within a given city, region, or country.

Both the federal definition of poverty and the census definition of concentrated poverty (40% threshold) have received criticism. The overall discussion for both cases has labeled the use of bureaucratic categories intended to facilitate both the routine collection of statistics and public assistance eligibility as unfit for comprehensively capturing urban social structures and strategies. Many criticisms revolve around the poverty threshold, the most prominent including the inability to fully consider the needs of different family types (e.g.: childcare services, health insurance, etc.), the non-cash benefits from public sources, the cash and non-cash resources (or lack thereof) from social and familial networks, and the consideration of regional variations in cost of living expenses.

Concurrently, the 40% benchmark used by the census and various scholars to define concentrated poverty does not refer to any adequately specific objective or subjective criteria. Jargowsky and Bane (1991) assert “...that the 40 percent criterion came very close to identifying areas that looked like ghettos in terms of their housing conditions.” They contend that “the areas selected by the 40 percent criterion corresponded closely with the neighborhoods that city officials and local Census Bureau officials considered ghettos.” Thus, these scholars argued that although “any fixed cutoff is inherently arbitrary...the 40 percent criterion appropriately identifies most ghetto neighborhoods.” Here we observe the threshold's justification on the basis of general personal impressions and impressions of city officials rather than any rigorous objective criteria.

In addition to contentious debate regarding the selection of particular percentage thresholds as accurate descriptive measures (i.e. 30% vs. 60% threshold of residents in poverty), other scholars criticized the use of an absolute indicator of poverty concentration as an analytic measure and tool for trend tracking. In one instance, researchers Massey and Eggers contend that a relative, segregation-based indicator is more rigorous and meaningful, claiming that "...levels and trends in poverty concentration are best studied with well-established measures of segregation that use complete information on the spatial distribution of income instead of an ad hoc and arbitrary definition of 'poverty neighborhoods' and 'poverty concentration'" Based on a recent growth of working poor populations and emergence of inner-suburban poverty, Jennifer Wolch and Nathan Sessoms have challenged the utility of the traditional 40% threshold concept of concentrated poverty. Their study shows that several areas in Southern California, which meet the 40% threshold, do not demonstrate the characteristics traditionally associated with areas of concentrated poverty, and do not suffer from extreme levels of dysfunction, crime, and blight. Additionally, they are often reasonably clean, safe, well-maintained, and home to several commercial/retail establishments, public facilities, etc. They also argue that the term has become conflated with "areas of social problems" and argue that the concept should be unhooked from behavioral definitions and stigma.

=== Territorial category ===
Areas of concentrated poverty as a territorial category have become both key targets of place-specific policy interventions and the object of analysis for comparative studies within policy research and the social sciences. Its use as a territorial category has also resulted in several critiques, beginning with the question of whether census tracts are good spatial categories for social-scientific analysis. Systematic field observations in various inner-city areas reveal that census tracts serve as poor proxies of what residents construe and construct as neighborhoods in their daily routines. Sociologist Loic Wacquant criticized the measure when used to denote or define “ghettos," a reference first made by Bane and Jargowsky and William Julius Wilson (see above). Scholars increasingly conflate areas of concentrated poverty and ghettos, something Wacquant claims camouflages the constitutive role of ethnoracial domination in the ghetto and hyperghetto.

According to Wacquant, this income-based notion of the ghetto is "ostensibly deracialized" and largely a product of policy-geared research fearful of the "strict taboo that weighs on segregation in the political sphere". Massey and Denton similarly question the use of a purely income-based measure to define areas of deprivation, showing strong empirical evidence and theorizing that high levels of racial segregation (defined by an index of dissimilarity above 60) produce distinct socio-economic constellations and processes. Additional questions by Wacquant include why rural communities and suburban tracts are often left out of social science analyses focusing on concentrated poverty.

=== Causal factor ===
Concentrated poverty is increasingly recognized as a "causal factor" in compounding the effects of poverty by isolating residents from networks and resources useful for realizing human potential (explored further in the effects section). William Julius Wilson coined these processes in The Truly Disadvantaged as "concentration effects." He termed the primary effect "social isolation", defined as the lack of contact or sustained interaction with individuals and institutions representing mainstream society. This isolation makes it much more difficult for those looking for jobs to be tied into the job network, also generating behavior not conducive to good work histories. A key in Wilson's idea of social isolation is the linking of behavioral outcomes of the ghetto poor to the structural constraints of the job market and historical discrimination. This contradicts the theory of a "culture of poverty," which stipulated that basic values and attitudes of the ghetto subculture have been internalized, placing a strong emphasis on the autonomous character of these cultural traits once they come into existence.

Many scholars have called to question this causal framing. For Wilson, concentrated poverty stood as a link between structural factors and social behaviors produced through the "concentration effects" of poverty. Subsequent policy and scholarly research have ignored such causes. According to Agnew, "one can start out using spatial concepts as shorthand for complex sociological processes but slip easily into substituting the spatial concepts for the more complex argument". Steinberg has claimed that this amounts to misdiagnosing the symptom as the disease, as the structural factors are severed from the spatial outcome, policy prescriptions to address concentrated poverty have shifted from economic policies to encourage full-employment to simply deconcentrating poverty (see section below). As Goetz observed, “Over time, focus has shifted away from the causes of concentrated poverty toward the behavior of the poor in response to concentrated poverty," which ultimately has led to reproducing the "culture of poverty" thesis in severing the theory from its structural roots.

== Causes ==
The shifting spatial distribution of poverty is attributed to various structural factors, primarily of an economic nature. According to William Julius Wilson in the 1987 book The Truly Disadvantaged: The Inner City, The Underclass, and Public Policy, the driving forces of American concentrated poverty date back to the 1970s. The following are some causes outlined in Wilson's book:

- Racial discrimination and segregation: In the early twentieth century, black people were discriminated against far more severely than white immigrants. Restrictive covenants, municipal policies, and federal housing programs forced black people, unlike other immigrant groups, into particular areas within inner cities. Concurrently, discrimination against black people was far more severe than against other groups in the labor market, leading to disproportionate poverty and concentration in low-paying jobs, particularly in industrial sectors. Collectively, these forms of racial and spatial discrimination laid the initial foundation for many areas of contemporary concentrated poverty.
- Deindustrialization: Black people's discrimination-driven concentration in low-wage sectors led to greater adverse effects and overall increased vulnerability during economic shifts in advanced industrial society. Their heavy concentration in the automobile, rubber, steel, and other smokestack industries meant that they were especially impacted by deindustrialization occurring in American cities from the 70s onward. Such disparities reveal the overall vulnerability of minorities to economic changes such as recessions, structural shifts, cutbacks, and other events driving job shifts, due to their disproportionate concentration in low-wage, often manual/industrial sectors.
- Increasing gaps between skilled and unskilled workers: Many new jobs in the post-1970s economy have disproportionately emerged in the service and knowledge sectors. Large wage inequalities characterize these sectors, which have lowered average household income compared to those holding better paying industrial jobs in the past (see Working Poor)
- Spatial mismatch: Suburban expansion shifted economic growth from the inner cities to suburbs. Spatial distance from places of employment, among other locations, prevented inner-city poor families from taking advantage of these new opportunities.
- White flight: Large scale migrations of wealthier white people from the inner-city were driven by increased fears and anxieties directed against minority populations. Construction of the federal highway system and expansions of federal mortgage programs facilitated these patterns. In turn, the proportion of both poor and black people in urban populations increased concurrently with the erosion of municipal tax bases, leading toward a downward spiral in the provision of public services, job opportunities, and economic development.
- Flight of the black middle class: Black inner-city middle-class families, taking advantage of increased opportunities for socioeconomic mobility following the end of several institutional racial restrictions after the civil rights movement, such as within federal housing loans and programs, moved to mixed neighborhoods or satellite suburbs. This increased the proportion of poor people within the ghetto, weakening civic institutions and investment in the local economy.
- Changes in age demographics: A simultaneous increase in the proportion of inner-city black youth accompanied increases in concentrated poverty. Populations of central-city black people aged 14 to 24 rose by 78% from 1960 to 1970, compared with an increase of 23% for whites of the same age. This demographic imbalance is often considered a contributing factor to increases in crime, teenage pregnancy, unemployment, and other factors associated with poverty.
- Changes in family structure: In 1965, 25% of all black families were headed by women. The proportion surpassed 28% in 1970 and reached 40% by 1979. Trends continued, with 43% in 1984 and 72% by 2010. Because poverty is measured at the household level, rather than the individual level, these demographic changes inevitably resulted in an "on-paper" increase in poverty rates. Furthermore, this data implies an increase in single-mother households, a demographic which several studies show faces disproportionate poverty.

== Effects ==
Several studies have pointed to the role of "neighborhood effects" caused by concentrated poverty. These studies indicate that neighborhood characteristics, particularly the concentration of poverty, affect crime and delinquency, education deficiencies, psychological distress, and various health problems, among many other issues. Thresholds, or tipping points, also prove important. In a recent review of research, George C. Galster notes that studies suggest “that the independent impacts of neighborhood poverty rates in encouraging negative outcomes for individuals like crime, school leaving, and duration of poverty spells appear to be nil unless the neighborhood exceeds about 20 percent poverty, whereupon the externality effects grow rapidly until the neighborhood reaches approximately 40 percent poverty; subsequent increases in the poverty population appear to have no marginal effect.”

Housing values and rents show similar patterns. Using data from the 100 largest U.S. metro areas from 1990 to 2000, Galster et al. find little relationship between neighborhood poverty rates and declines in neighborhood housing values and rents until poverty exceeds 10 percent, at which point values decline rapidly before becoming shallower at very high poverty levels.

The Pew Economic Mobility Project conducted one of the largest studies examining concentrated poverty's effects, tracking 5,000 families since 1968. The study found that no other factor, including parents' education, employment, or marital status, was as important as neighborhood poverty in explaining why African-American children were disproportionately more likely to have lower incomes than their parents as adults. Thus, the concentrated poverty rate aims to capture the extent of a possible “double burden” imposed on poor families living in extremely poor communities; both being poor and living in a poor community. The study also found negative effects on the better-off children raised in such areas. While initial research failed to isolate the direct effects of "concentrated poverty" itself, more recent work has shifted to identifying its primary mechanisms. This scholarship us primarily focused on examining the social-interactive and institutional aspects produced through concentrated poverty, rather than a sole focus on the socioeconomic characteristics of neighborhoods. Below is an overview of these effects and mechanisms.

=== Mechanisms ===
(From George C. Galster, "The Mechanism(s) of Neighborhood Effects: Theory, Evidence, and Policy Implications").

==== Social interactive effects ====
This set of mechanisms refers to social processes endogenous to neighborhoods. These processes include:

- Social contagion: Behaviors, aspirations, and attitudes may be changed by contact with peers who are neighbors. Under certain conditions these changes can take on contagion dynamics that are akin to “epidemics.”
- Collective socialization: Individuals may be encouraged to conform to local social norms conveyed by neighborhood role models and other social pressures. This socialization effect is characterized by a minimum threshold or critical mass being achieved before a norm can produce noticeable consequences for others in the neighborhood.
- Social networks: Individuals may be influenced by the interpersonal communication of information and resources of various kinds transmitted through neighbors. These networks can involve either “strong ties” and/or “weak ties.”
- Social cohesion and control: The degree of neighborhood social disorder and its converse, “collective efficacy" may influence a variety of behaviors and psychological reactions of residents.
- Relative deprivation: This mechanism suggests that residents who have achieved some socioeconomic success will be a source of disamenities for their less-well off neighbors. The latter, it is argued, will view the successful with envy and/or will make them perceive their own relative inferiority as a source of dissatisfaction.
- Parental mediation: The neighborhood may affect (through any of the mechanisms listed under all categories here) parents’ physical and mental health, stress, coping skills, sense of efficacy, behaviors, and material resources. All of these, in turn, may affect the home environment in which children are raised.

==== Environmental effects ====
Environmental mechanisms refer to natural and human-made attributes of the local space that may affect directly the mental and/or physical health of residents without affecting their behaviors. As in the case of social-interactive mechanism, the environmental category can also assume distinct forms:

- Exposure to violence: If people sense that their property or person is in danger they may suffer psychological and physical responses that may impair their functioning or sensed well-being. These consequences are likely to be even more pronounced if the person has been victimized.
- Physical surroundings: Decayed physical conditions of the built environment (e.g., deteriorated structures and public infrastructure, litter, graffiti) may impart psychological effects on residents,

==== Geographical effects ====
Geographic mechanisms refer to aspects of spaces that may affect residents’ life courses yet do not arise within the neighborhood but rather purely because of the neighborhood's location relative to larger-scale political and economic forces such as:

- Spatial mismatch: Certain neighborhoods may have little accessibility (in either spatial proximity or as mediated by transportation networks) to job opportunities appropriate to the skills of their residents, thereby restricting their employment opportunities.
- Public services: Some neighborhoods may be located within local political jurisdictions that offer inferior public services and facilities because of their limited tax base resources, incompetence, corruption, or other operational challenges. These, in turn, may adversely affect the personal development and educational opportunities of residents.

==== Institutional effects ====
The last category of mechanisms involves actions by those typically not residing in the given neighborhood who control important institutional resources located there and/or points of interface between neighborhood residents and vital markets:

- Stigmatization: Neighborhoods may be stigmatized on the basis of public stereotypes held by powerful institutional or private actors about its current residents. In other cases this may occur regardless of the neighborhood's current population because of its history, environmental or topographical disamenities, style, scale and type of dwellings, or condition of their commercial districts and public spaces. Such stigma may reduce the opportunities and perceptions of residents of stigmatized areas in a variety of ways, such as job opportunities and self-esteem.
- Local institutional resources: Some neighborhoods may have access to few and/or high-quality private, non-profit, or public institutions and organizations, such as benevolent charities, day care facilities, schools, and medical clinics. The lack of same may adversely affect the personal development opportunities of residents.
- Local market actors: There may be substantial spatial variations in the prevalence of certain private market actors that may encourage or discourage certain behaviors by neighborhood residents, such as liquor stores, fresh food markets, fast food restaurants, and illegal drug markets.

== Regional examples ==
Concentrated poverty is a global phenomenon, with examples visible in both developed and developing countries. According to the Brookings Institution, post-industrial revolution growth has spread unevenly between and within countries, with many developing countries likely to still have regional examples of extreme poverty. Through spatial analysis of satellite imagine, the Brookings Institution defined various "hotspots" of extreme poverty, primarily in areas of tropical Africa, tropical Latin America, Central-South Asia, and Southeast Asia/Western Oceania. Although this analysis does not refer specifically to concentrated poverty, rather more broadly to extreme poverty, its conclusions underscore the widespread nature of concentrated poverty, as well as its relationship to extreme poverty and poverty cycles. Despite positive trends in the reduction of global poverty rates, researchers such as Oxford's Max Roser and Esteban Ortiz-Ospina highlight the deepening divide between socioeconomic classes worldwide, which in turn paints an inaccurate image of the conditions faced by most populations.

Instead, regions such as Africa and Asia observe overall economic growth while its poorest populations stagnate. The widespread nature of extreme poverty, as well as trends pointing towards the growth of concentrated poverty, suggest a need to explore this issue through a more global lens. The following are examples of concentrated poverty through the lens of various countries/regions, ranging from developed to developing. While it is not an exhaustive list of examples, the overall goal is to provide information regarding the diverse characteristics of concentrated poverty.

=== American trends ===
==== 1970–1990 ====
The number of people living in high-poverty neighborhoods – where the poverty rate was 40% or higher – doubled between 1970 and 1990. It was not until after the release of the 1980 census, however, that trends of poverty concentration were systematically studied, as the 1970 census was the first instance where the 40% measure was employed. Studying these trends, sociologist William Julius Wilson made the following discoveries regarding the decade of the 1970s:

1. Poverty increased dramatically throughout metropolitan areas of the United States.
2. The number of poor people residing within poor metropolitan areas increased
3. The exacerbation of poverty conditions primarily occurred within African-American neighborhoods.
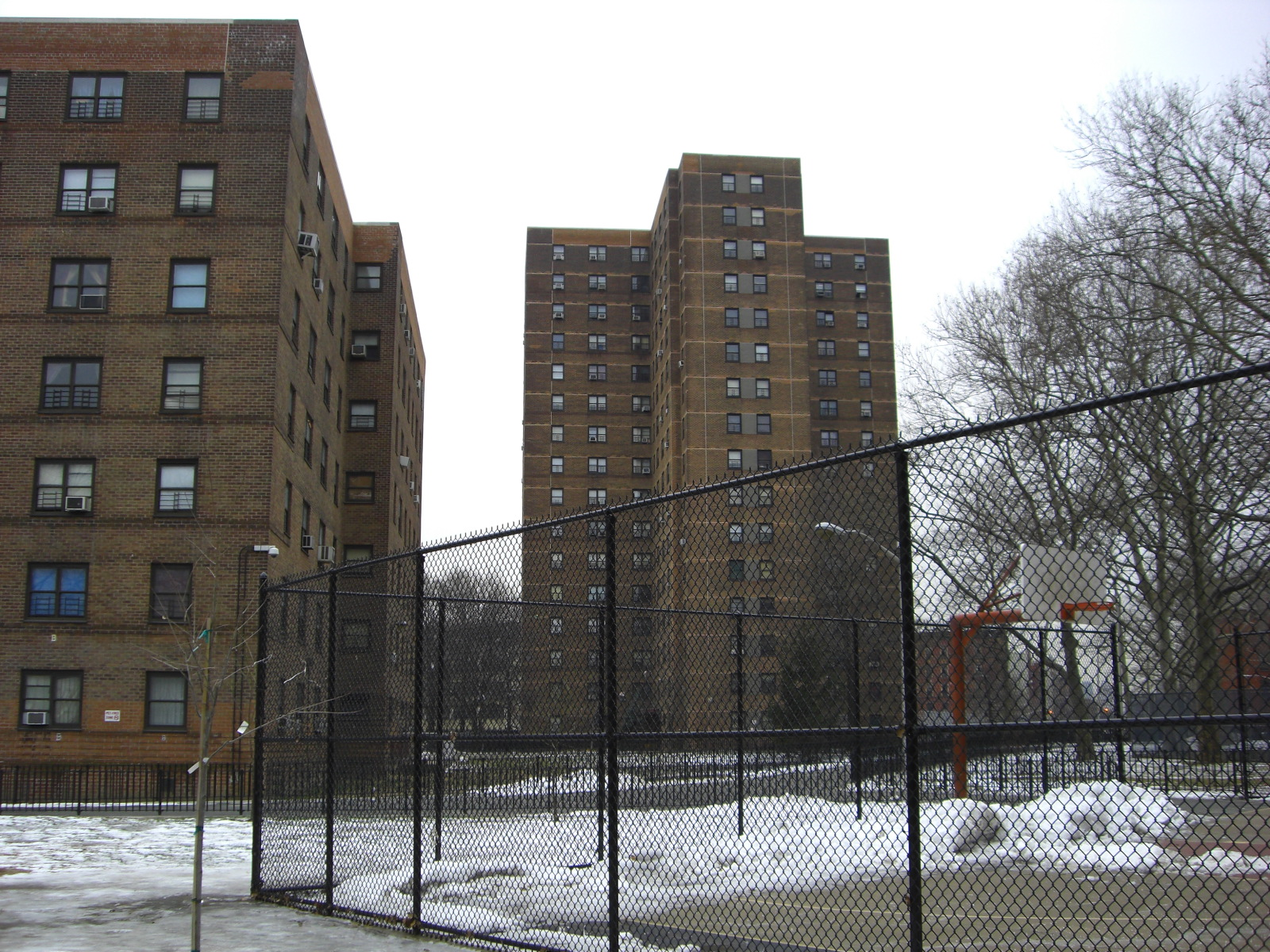
  Robert F. Wagner public housing in East Harlem, New York City.

Several other scholars later affirmed a dramatic increase in the number of neighborhoods classified as areas of concentrated poverty in the 1970s. The increase of neighborhoods classified as areas of "extreme poverty" continued into the 1980s, albeit to a lesser extent. The same trends of concentrated poverty observed at the census tract and neighborhood levels were similarly observed at the metropolitan statistical area (MSA) level. Both decades between 1970 and 1990 saw an increased difference in poverty rates between central cities and their suburbs, reflecting an increasing spatial concentration of MSA poverty within central cities. The changing spatial distribution of poverty has been attributed to the following:

- Changes in the labor market due to deindustrialization, leading to a widening wage gap between skilled and unskilled workers and spatial mismatches between the types of jobs offered in cities and the type of workers residing within them.
- Declining economic growth (several studies, however, demonstrate a weak or non-existent link between poverty reduction and urban economic growth in neighborhoods with extreme poverty).
- Relocation of upper- and middle- income residents from cities to suburbs, alongside demographic changes such as the rise in one-parent households and a decrease in labor market participation.

Such changes were intertwined with America's history of ethno-racial segregation. Some of its effects include white flight from American cities, leading to a declining tax base to provide city services, and the civil rights movement, allowing better-off blacks to leave inner-city areas. While concentrated poverty between 1970 and 1990 increased among blacks, Hispanics, and whites, the most dramatic increases were observed among blacks, followed by Hispanics, and to a much lesser extent whites.

==== 1990–2000 ====
In the 1990s, the number of people living in high-poverty neighborhoods declined by 24%, or 2.5 million people. The steepest declines in high-poverty neighborhoods occurred in metropolitan areas in the Midwest and South, and the overall share of poor people living in high-poverty neighborhoods declined among all racial groups. The decline of the number of high-poverty neighborhoods occurred in rural areas and central cities, while suburbs experienced minimal change. Scholars have also recognized qualitative shifts in areas of "concentrated poverty."

A study of Southern California's (a state which observed increases in concentrated poverty during the 1990s despite national downward trends) metropolitan areas by Wolch and Sessoms draws attention to the contrast between growing inner-suburban poverty and the original intention of the concentrated poverty statistic. These areas, which qualify as "extreme poverty" under the 40% threshold, do not demonstrate the negative social behaviors or physical decay of traditional images that the original statistic was designed to designate. Other scholars argued for an expansion of the definition, challenging Jargowsky's claim of decreasing poverty concentration in the 1990s. Using the relative definition of poverty employed in Europe, based on 50% of the median income in each region, Swanstrom et al. point to an increase in concentrated poverty throughout most American cities during the 1990s.

==== 2000–present ====
Example of public housing in South Minneapolis, Minnesota.

From 2000 to 2009, the populations of extremely poor neighborhoods climbed by over one third, from 6.6 million to 8.7 million, erasing any progress claimed during the 1990s. During that time, the share of poor people living in such neighborhoods grew from 9.1% to 10.5%, highlighting the "double burden" effect of their individual poverty and the poverty within their community.

A Brookings Institution report attributes this trend to both the downturn of 2000 and the 2008 recession. This poverty not only affected inner cities, but continued to spread into the suburbs, extending the suburbanization trend of concentrated poverty first noted in the 1990s. Furthermore, the study indicated that the concentrated poverty rates of 2010 was approaching an all-time high. In metro areas, concentrated poverty grew to 15.1%, a considerable increase from 11.7% between 2005 and 2009 and nearing the previous record of 16.5% from 1990. Such trend appears to confirm William Julius Wilson's original thesis, which states that extremely poor neighborhoods and their residents are the last to benefit from economic growth and the first to suffer from economic troubles.

=== Brazil ===
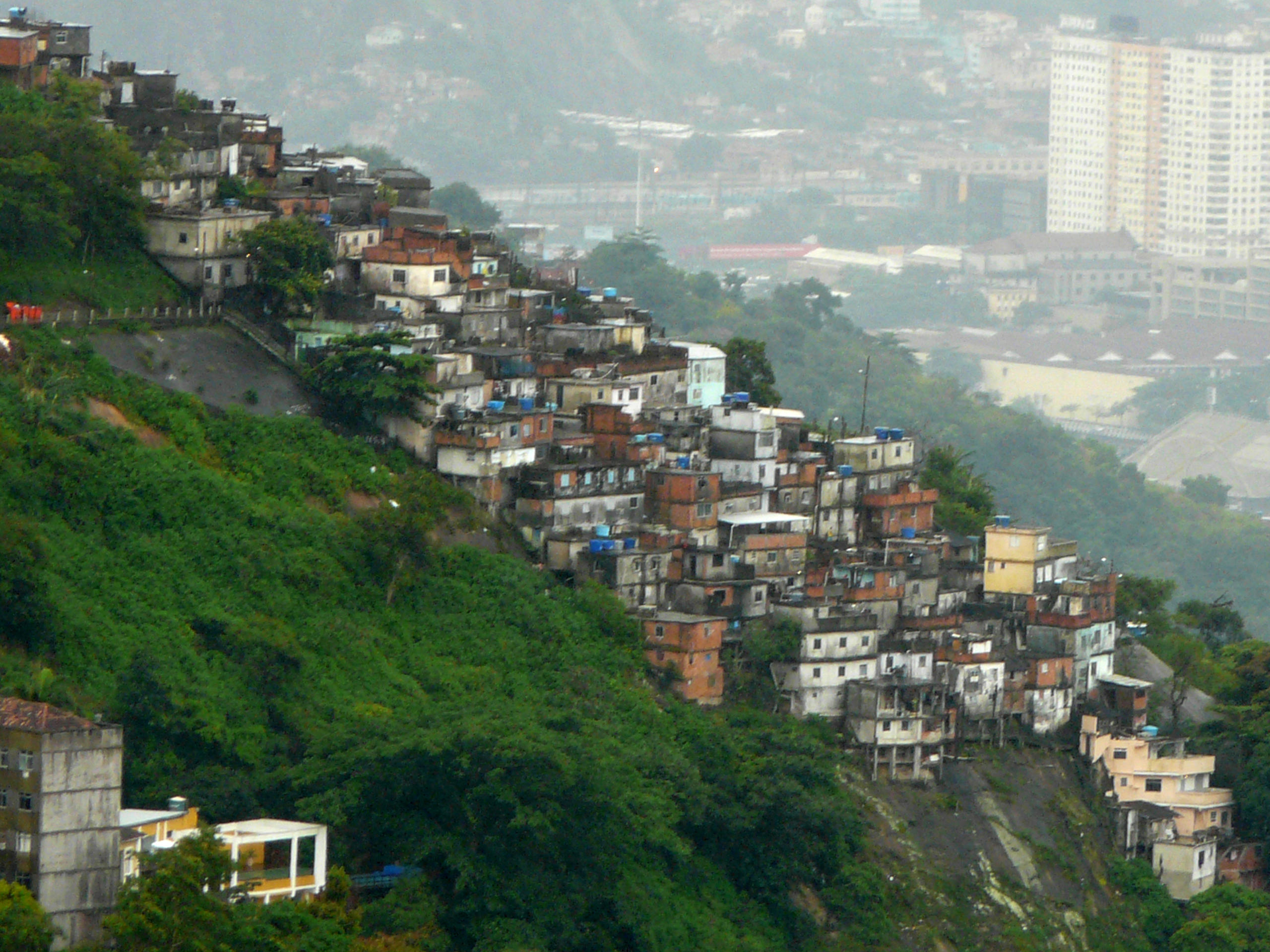
Favela neighborhood on the periphery of an urban area.

Despite its ranking as one of the largest economies in the world, Brazil continues facing deep socioeconomic inequality. According to a 2008 paper by Nathalie Beghin for Oxfam International employing data from the Institute for Applied Economic Research, 11.5% of its population was categorized as extremely poor, with an overall 30.3% (including the aforementioned 11.5%) classified as "poor."

Beghin further states that Brazil's poverty rate is in some cases more than three times higher than that of comparable economies. Such economic situation in turn confines poor people to areas with large spatial concentrations of poverty, such as the infamous Favelas, neighborhoods with few access to government services, high crime, and poor living conditions. According to a descriptive study by Brueckner et al. for the Journal of Housing Economics, significant rural to urban migration in the second half of the 1900s led to unprecedented metropolitan population growth. Given the rapid influx of often-poor migrants, as well as insufficient housing, slums developed along the edges of cities. These neighborhoods did not follow building codes, lacking sanitation and other services.

Exhibiting similarities to examples of concentrated poverty in the United States, neighborhoods such as favelas have additionally struggled with racial and socioeconomic discrimination. Working on Brazilian census data, the Brueckner et al. study underscores the racial disparity of favela residents, finding a statistically significantly greater chance of non-white residents existing within favelas than the rest of Brazilian urban areas. Given their relative disconnect from government oversight, favelas are frequently depicted as breeding grounds for organized crime. A study for the Political and Legal Anthropology Review outlines criminal organizations' strategies for finding refuge within favelas, involving complex relationships with favela residents. These organizations essentially act as a government for favelas, claiming to provide order, security, and resources. Within this study, however, such security is referred to as "ordered disorder," due to the continued threat of violence to residents brought forth by criminal activity.

=== Turkey ===
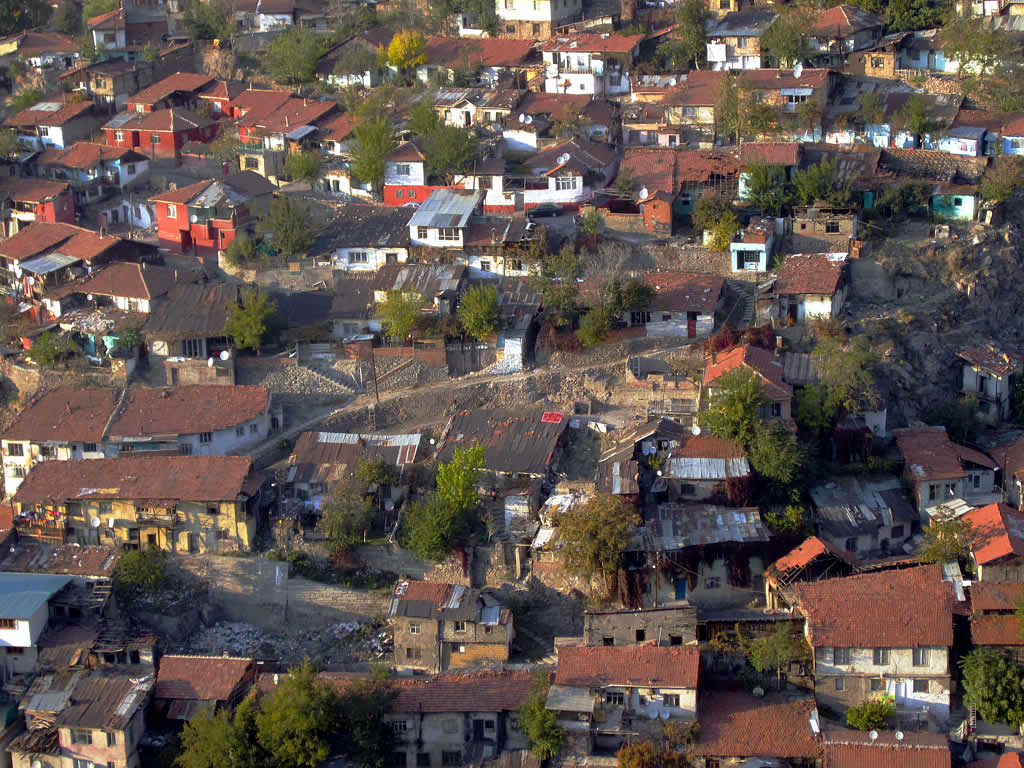
Gecekondu neighborhood in Ankara, Turkey.

Similar to Brazil, Turkey experienced an explosive rate of urbanization throughout the 20th century, leading to various hasty attempts at expanding urban housing capacities. Citing a variety of Turkish government sources, the Middle East Institute describes Istanbul, Turkey's largest city, as increasing its share of the total Turkish population from 5% in 1955 to at least 14% in 2000, with continued growth patterns. Gecekondu refers to neighborhoods built through legally-questionable methods to house rural migrants within or outside urban centers. The primary demographic of gecekondu residents are rural poor seeking improved living conditions and urban employment. Research published in Turkey's Megaron journal by Bektaş & Yücel outline vast problems faced by the residents of gecekondus, relating primarily to their integration to urban life, as well as spatial distribution.

In essence, their study reveals the impact of continued rapid migration patterns and insufficient governmental responses on urban inequality. As more residents settle into urban centers, the concentration of poverty increases while resources become increasingly scarce. Gecekondu residents face additional hardships due to the questionable legality of their housing: as gecekondus are traditionally built through legal loopholes, avoiding costs associated with formal land use, residents may encounter a problematic relationship with government entities. In a paper for the journal Urban Anthropology and Studies of Cultural Systems and World Economic Development, researcher Tahire Erman explores the relationship between gecekondu residents and government intervention, revealing the residents' decreasing bargaining power. Primarily, the demographic makeup of gecekondus have led to varying levels of government attention to different neighborhoods.

As the years progressed and Turkish politics shifted toward neoliberalism, neighborhoods grew increasingly divided, with the largest ramifications being a loss of collective bargaining power. Consequently, residents are more vulnerable to displacement and face increasing governmental neglect. Overall, gecekondu neighborhoods stand as examples of the negative effects inherent to and generated by concentrated poverty, with residents facing poor living conditions and socioeconomic and political barriers to integration.

== Examples of policy interventions ==
=== United States ===
Beginning in the early 1990s, federal housing policy has focused on reducing the spatial concentration of poverty, accomplished through three methods:

1. Creating income diversity within public housing developments that continue to be owned and operated by public housing authorities under the rules of the public housing program.
2. Creating income diversity in new or redeveloped housing projects, including former public housing projects redeveloped under the HOPE VI program.
3. Encouraging the use of tenant-based housing vouchers for families to locate in neighborhoods that will improve the life opportunities of family members.

==== Mobility programs ====
Authorized in 1992, the Moving To Opportunity (MTO) pilot program provided section 8 vouchers to public housing residents to enable them to move out of public housing and into neighborhoods with lower poverty. Modeled after Chicago's Gautreaux program, which provided housing vouchers to black public housing residents so they could move to more integrated neighborhoods, MTO stands as an example of "mobility programs" aimed at enabling poor families from high-poverty neighborhoods to move into communities featuring decreased poverty levels, such as middle-class neighborhoods.

Comparatively, the Gatreuax program exhibited stronger and clearer results than MTO. The program assigned participants selected from the same pool of callers to random private apartment placements in either suburban or urban locations. Follow-ups several years later revealed different outcomes between suburban and urban participants. Namely, urban participants were more likely to have remained on welfare rolls while their suburban counterparts were very likely to find employment and leave welfare programs. Additionally, children of urban participants were likely to drop out of high school while suburban participants were likely to graduate from high school and proceed towards college. The children of both types of participants began below the average academic level of their peers, however due to the lower number of participants selected for suburbs, suburban participants' children experience greater individual instruction. In turn, suburban children eventually reached the same level of academic proficiency as their average classmates.

On the other hand, participants of the MTO program experienced non-significant changes in employment and educational improvement, with nearly half of all participants moving back or remaining in their original neighborhood. Most participants did not move into suburbs, instead moving more frequently into other nearby urban neighborhoods with lower poverty levels. The program did show significant improvements regarding the fostering of a sense of security among participants, resulting in the reduction of stress, fear, and depression, particularly among women and young girls.

Several scholars have questioned both the success and broader ability of such policy interventions as an adequate response to concentrated poverty. Goetz argues that voluntary programs like MTO and Gautreaux, though justifiable on other grounds, will not make a dent in concentrated poverty for two reasons:

1. They primarily select families most likely to succeed in their new environments, essentially the "cream of the crop."
2. They do not reach sufficient scales to noticeably affect overall settlement patterns.

MTO, Gautreaux and other voluntary mobility programs can apply to only a subset of the poor by the political reality of destination communities. Low-poverty areas are not anxious to receive large numbers of poor, public housing families, and there will typically be political backlash if current residents feel that these families are being forced into their neighborhoods, and it was this type of resistance that ended the expansion of the program in 1995. Venkatesh and Celimi point out, dispersal programs incorrectly assume the poor can relocate as easily as the middle class does. In fact, very real resource constraints limit the ability of public housing families to abandon existing support networks, and these constraints limit the attractiveness of dispersal strategies to poor families. Lastly, mobility programs have historically contributed to disadvantages for the current residents of neighborhoods where poor families have been relocated.

==== Hope VI ====
Hope VI is a federal housing plan designed to revitalize American public housing projects into mixed-income developments. In most cases, such projects involve demolishing older high rise buildings composed entirely of extremely low-income residents and constructing higher quality, low-density, housing with various tiers of income earners.

While Hope VI has successfully de-concentrated public housing sites, it has done little to de-concentrate poverty within poor neighborhoods in general. Public housing families who are displaced and relocated typically re-concentrate in other poor neighborhoods nearby. Very rarely do these families relocate to low-poverty suburbs. Over half of families relocated by HOPE VI either move into other public housing or use vouchers to rent units on the private market. Public housing units are more likely to be in low-income neighborhoods. Families using vouchers are also likely to move into low-income areas, as they are more likely to find program-eligible units and landlords willing to rent to them. Therefore, while HOPE VI has significantly improved the physical quality of several public housing sites and the lives of former residents given units in the new developments, it has come short of addressing the issue of concentrated poverty at large.

== See also ==
- WikiProject: International Development
- Main page on poverty
- Accumulation by dispossession
- Causes of poverty
- Poverty trap
- Extreme poverty
- Environmental racism
- Poverty Map
- Concentrated disadvantage
