= Underclass =

Lowest position in a class hierarchy

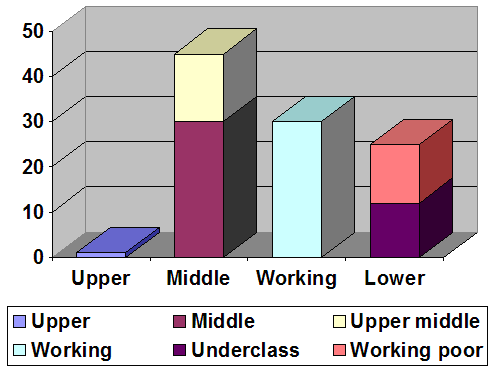
The term underclass is employed by sociologists such as Dennis Gilbert to describe the most disadvantaged socio-economic demographic with the least access to scarce resources. In this chart constructed by Gilbert, the American underclass is estimated to constitute roughly 12% of U.S. households (in 1998).

The underclass is the segment of the population that occupies the lowest possible position in a class hierarchy, below the core body of the working class. This group is usually considered cut off from the rest of the society.

The general idea that a class system includes a population under the working class has a long tradition in the social sciences (for example, lumpenproletariat). However, the specific term, underclass, was popularized during the last half of the 20th century, first by social scientists of American poverty, and then by American journalists.

The underclass concept has been a point of controversy among social scientists. Definitions and explanations of the underclass, as well as proposed solutions for managing or fixing the underclass problem have been highly debated.

== History ==
Gunnar Myrdal is generally credited as the first proponent of the term underclass. Writing in the early 1960s on economic inequality in the U.S., Myrdal's underclass refers to a "class of unemployed, unemployables, and underemployed, who are more and more hopelessly set apart from the nation at large, and do not share in its life, its ambitions, and its achievements". However, this general conception of a class or category of people below the core of the working class has a long tradition in the social sciences, such as through the work of Henry Mayhew, whose London Labour and the London Poor sought to describe the hitherto invisible world of casual workers, prostitutes, and street-people.

The specific concept of an underclass in the U.S. underwent several transformations during the decades following Myrdal's introduction of the term. According to sociologist Herbert Gans, while Myrdal's structural conceptualization of the underclass remained relatively intact through the writings of William Julius Wilson and others, in several respects the structural definition was abandoned by many journalists and academics, and replaced with a behavioral conception of the underclass, which fuses Myrdal's term with Oscar Lewis's and others' conception of a "culture of poverty".

== Definitions ==
Various definitions of the underclass have been set forth since the term's initial conception; however, all of these definitions are basically different ways of imagining a category of people beneath the working class. The definitions vary by which particular dimensions of this group are highlighted. A few popular descriptions of the underclass are considered as follows.

=== Focus on economics ===
Marxian sociologist Erik Olin Wright sees the underclass as a "category of social agents who are economically oppressed but not consistently exploited within a given class system". The underclass occupies the lowest possible rung on a class ladder. According to Wright, the underclass are oppressed. He believes this is because they are generally denied access to the labor market, and thus they cannot rise above their status easily but also thus are "not consistently exploited" because the opportunity for their economic exploitation is minimal for the classes above.

Unlike the working class, which he believes is routinely exploited for their labor power by higher classes, the underclass in Wright's view, do not hold the labor power worthy of exploitation. Wright argues his highly doctrinaire opinion of class malevolence that:

The material interests of the wealthy and privileged segments of American society would be better served if these people simply disappeared…The alternative, then, is to build prisons, to cordon off the zones of cities in which the underclass live. In such a situation the main potential power of the underclass against their oppressors comes from their capacity to disrupt the sphere of consumption, especially through crime and other forms of violence, not their capacity to disrupt production through their control over labor.

This quote partly concerns the spaces and locations for the underclass and reflects the leftist view of the other classes as acting against the underclass in unison, as opposed to other sociological views seeing class actors behaving as individuals reacting to individual incentives within society.

=== Focus on space and place ===
The underclass generally occupies specific zones in the city. Thus, the notion of an underclass is popular in Urban Sociology, and particularly in accounts of urban poverty. The term, underclass, and the phrase, urban underclass, are, for the most part, used interchangeably. Studies concerning the post-civil rights African American ghetto often include a discussion of the urban underclass. Many writings concerning the underclass, particularly in the U.S., are urban-focused.

William Julius Wilson's books, The Declining Significance of Race (1978) and The Truly Disadvantaged (1987), are popular accounts of the black urban underclass. Wilson defines the underclass as "a massive population at the very bottom of the social ladder plagued by poor education and low-paying jobs." He generally limits his discussion to those trapped in the post-civil-rights ghetto in the American rust belt (see "Potential Causes and Proposed Solutions" section of this entry for a more detailed summary of Wilson on the underclass).

Elijah Anderson's, Streetwise (1990), employs ethnographic methods to study a gentrifying neighborhood, "The Village" (pseudonym), bordering a black ghetto, "Northton" (pseudonym), in an American city. Anderson provides the following description of the underclass in this ghetto:

The underclass of Northton is made up of people who have failed to keep up with their brethren, both in employment and sociability. Essentially they can be seen as victims of the economic and social system. They make up the unemployed, the underskilled, and the poorly educated, even though some hold high-school diplomas. Many are intelligent, but they are demoralized by racism and the wall of social resistance facing them. In this context they lose perspective and lack an outlook and sensibility that would allow them to negotiate the wider system of employment and society in general.

=== Focus on behavior ===
Lawrence M. Mead defines the underclass as a group that is poor and behaviorally deficient. He describes the underclass as dysfunctional. He provides the following definition in his 1986 book, Beyond Entitlement,

The underclass is most visible in urban slum settings and is about 70 percent nonwhite, but it includes many rural and white people as well, especially in Appalachia and the South. Much of the urban underclass is made up of street hustlers, welfare families, drug addicts, and former mental patients. There are, of course, people who function well – the so-called 'deserving' or 'working poor' – and better-off people who function poorly, but in general low income and serious behavioral difficulties go together. The underclass is not large as a share of population, perhaps 9 million people, but it accounts for the lion's share of the most serious disorders in American life, especially in the cities.

Ken Auletta, often credited as the primary journalist who brought the underclass term to the forefront of the American consciousness, describes the American underclass as non-assimilated Americans, and he suggests that the underclass may be subcategorized into four distinct groups:

(1) the passive poor, usually long-term welfare recipients; (2) the hostile street criminals who terrorize most cities, and who are often school dropouts and drug addicts; (3) the hustlers, who, like street criminals, may not be poor and who earn their livelihood in an underground economy, but rarely commit violent crimes; (4) the traumatized drunks, drifters, homeless shopping-bag ladies, and released mental patients who frequently roam or collapse on city streets.

=== Controversies amongst definitions ===
Each of the above definitions is said to conceptualize the same general group – the American underclass – but they provide somewhat competing imagery. While Wright, Wilson, and Anderson each position the underclass in reference to the labor market, Auletta's definition is simply "non-assimilation" and his examples, along with Mead's definition, highlight underclass members' participation in deviant behavior and their adoption of an antisocial outlook on life. These controversies are elaborated further in the next section ("Characteristics of the Underclass").

As evident with Mead and Auletta's framing, some definitions of the underclass significantly diverge from the initial notion of an economic group beneath the working class. A few writings on the underclass distinguish between various types of underclass, such as the social underclass, the impoverished underclass, the reproductive underclass, the educational underclass, the violent underclass, and the criminal underclass, with some expected horizontal mobility between these groups. Even more divergent from the initial notion of an underclass are the recent journalistic accounts of a so-called "genetic underclass", referring to a genetic inheritance of a predisposition to addiction and other personality traits traditionally associated with behavioral definitions of the underclass. However, such distinctions between criminal, social, impoverished, and other specified underclass terms still refer to the same general group—those beneath the working class. And, despite recent journalistic accounts of a "genetic underclass", the underclass concept is primarily, and has traditionally been, a social science term.

== Race, Class and the Underclass ==
There has been an ongoing debate among social scientists since the 1970s concerning what racial characteristics make up the "underclass" and if race or class can best explain these characteristics.

=== Racialization of the term ===
Herbert Gans stated in 1990 that the then-dominant U.S. definition of an underclass differed from economist Gunnar Myrdal’s definition in two significant ways. It characterized the group as largely composed of black and Hispanic people; whereas Myrdal defined it purely based upon economics. This definition included behaviors deemed undeserving by those who used it.

William Julius Wilson cited figures showing how strongly concentrated poverty varied by race. According to Wilson, in 1980 approximately 2.4 million poor individuals lived in census tracts where the poverty rate was at least 40% and approximately 65% of those individuals were black, while approximately 22% were Hispanic.

=== Class-based Explanations ===
In his book The Declining Significance of Race, published in 1978, Wilson argued that economic class had surpassed race as a determinant of an individual’s life chances, specifically for black Americans, and that a historical legacy of discrimination led to the creation of a black underclass.Wilson believed that subsequent changes in the economy and technology had resulted in a permanent status for this underclass.Wilson further argued that the passage of civil rights legislation and affirmative action programs assisted in placing educated black workers into corporate and governmental positions; however, these same programs failed to alleviate the economic obstacles faced by members of the underclass, thus widening class-based divisions among black Americans. Wilson emphasized that he did not believe that racial conflict had dissipated; however, he did argue that the basis for racial conflict had changed from being rooted within the economy to existing within the social-political structure.

Subsequent writings by Wilson restated his argument that a history of discriminatory practices coupled with mass migrations of minorities to larger metropolitan areas resulted in urban minority populations experiencing a weak attachment to the workforce, thereby increasing their vulnerability to economic shifts occurring post-1970. Wilson also argued that when middle-class black families departed from inner-city neighborhoods they took away potential role models for the remaining impoverished residents, thereby concentrating poverty within those neighborhoods.

=== Race-based Explanations ===
==== Residential Segregation ====
Douglas Massey and Nancy Denton agreed with Wilson regarding the impact of economic restructuring on increasing poverty levels experienced by black Americans; however, they argued that residential segregation caused poverty to be confined to a small number of neighborhoods. The authors pointed out that a map of poverty in Chicago during 1980 bore a striking resemblance to a 1934 map showing families receiving public assistance during the Great Depression. Therefore, Massey and Denton concluded that concentrated black poverty existed prior to the civil rights era.A review of later research conducted by Mario Small and Katherine Newman indicated that a study authored by Quillian provided evidence supporting both arguments.

Gans also argued that the term “underclass” functioned as a racial code word. Wilson acknowledged this critique and subsequently used an alternative term, “ghetto poor”, in his own research.

==== Wealth ====
Melvin Oliver and Thomas Shapiro also suggested that wealth reveals more of the racial inequality that is present in society than income does, since wealth carries the effects of previous discriminatory actions against races of people into each successive generation. Oliver and Shapiro stated that most analysts (with Wilson being the most influential) have generally focused their analysis on how Class is the primary cause of continued racial inequality. In contrast to this way of thinking, viewing Wealth as the focal point of analysis clearly demonstrates the impact of both Class and Race. When reporting on the differences in the economic status of White Middle-Class households versus Black Middle-Class households, Oliver and Shapiro stated that Black Middle-Class households earn approximately 70 cents for every dollar earned by White Middle-Class households; however, Black Middle-Class households hold approximately 15 cents for every dollar of Wealth that White Middle-Class households possess. Oliver and Shapiro reported that 61% of Black Households have zero or negative net financial assets.

Oliver and Shapiro identified three ways in which these gaps are caused: State Policies that impede Black Wealth Accumulation (the “racialization of state policy”); Legal Restrictions that kept Black-Owned Businesses out of the Open Market. This process is referred to as the “Economic Detour” and the Cumulative Effect of Past Discrimination across Generations (the “sedimentation of racial inequality”). When comparing White and Black Households with similar Education and Occupations, there was aan approximate difference of 43 thousand dollars ($43,143) in Home Equity and Financial Assets. Based upon information provided by Oliver and Shapiro regarding Discriminatory Mortgage Lending Practices and Racial Disparities within Housing Markets, this differential can be directly linked to those causes. Therefore, Oliver and Shapiro advocate for two types of policy initiatives: Those specific to Black Americans and Asset-Building Policy Initiatives for Poor Households regardless of Race.

==== Employment discrimination ====
Devah Pager studied whether there was racial and criminal-record hiring bias in an audit she conducted in 2001 of approximately 350 entry-level positions available in Milwaukee. There were two pairs of equally qualified applicants; they were all male, one pair black and one pair white. One person from each pair was assigned a criminal record. White applicants (with no criminal history) received callbacks from employers in 34% of their applications, while those with a criminal record received callbacks in 17% of their applications. Black applicants did far worse. The black applicants without a criminal record got a callback in 14% of their applications, while those with a record got a callback in 5%. White applicants with a criminal record received 50% fewer callbacks (17% vs. 34%) than those without a record. Black applicants with criminal records got about one-third as many callbacks (64% fewer) than those without. In other words, the impact of race on callback rates was equal to or exceeded that of having a criminal record.

=== Assessments of the two accounts ===
The authors then reviewed other studies and noted that, while Wilson’s view and Massey and Denton’s view are often presented as competing explanations, Lincoln Quillian (1999) also found evidence supporting both views. Small and Newman reported that one of the processes that led to the formation of “new” high poverty areas is the exodus of non-poor Black residents from moderately poor areas. They also reported that when areas became increasingly populated with blacks, these areas rapidly lost their white population.

=== Comparison with the Philippines ===
The author notes that while the U.S. model of segregation (race, place, poverty) is often applied to large urban areas of the Global South, according to Marco Garrido, segregation in these areas is based primarily on class rather than race. While Garrido does not suggest that class is the sole cause of segregation in cities in the Global South or that class plays no role in shaping segregation in the U.S., his point is an argument about the relative importance of race versus class in structuring segregation patterns.

Garrido further argues that in Metro Manila, the slums were formed due to rural migrants being excluded from access to formal housing markets, and were less the result of racial discrimination. It is estimated that the slums contain more than 5 million people, representing more than 40% of the metropolitan area’s population, compared to only a minority of the urban population living in U.S. cities’ ghettos. The slums in Manila are geographically scattered, with over 1900 informal settlements identified in 2011, and often located near the gated communities of the affluent and middle-class populations.

While Wilson describes the social isolation of residents in U.S. ghettos, Garrido describes the frequent interactions between slum dwellers and inhabitants of gated communities, though such interactions are far from equal. Slum residents frequently engage in employment opportunities working for residents of gated communities while experiencing stigma from said residents.

Garrido critiques Massey and Denton’s theory of the underclass for treating segregation as reinforcing an existing racial identity, whereas in Manila, it was residence and the resulting identities as ‘squatter’ or ‘villager’ that defined these class identities.

== Characteristics ==
The underclass is located by a collection of identifying characteristics, such as high levels of joblessness, out-of-wedlock births, crime, violence, substance abuse, and high school dropout rates. The underclass harbors these traits to a greater degree than the general population, and other classes more specifically.

Joel Rogers and James D. Wright identify four general themes by which these characteristics are organized within academic and journalistic accounts of the underclass: economic, social-psychological, behavioral, and ecological (spatial concentration).

=== Economic characteristics ===
The economic dimension is the most basic and least contested theme of the underclass – the underclass is overwhelmingly poor. The underclass experiences high levels of joblessness, and what little employment its members hold in the formal economy is best described as precarious labor. However, simply being poor is not synonymous with being part of the underclass. The underclass is persistently poor and, for most definitions, the underclass live in areas of concentrated poverty. Some scholars, such as Ricketts and Sawhill, argue that being poor is not a requirement for underclass membership, and thus there are individuals who are non-poor members of the underclass because they live in "underclass areas" and embody other characteristics of the underclass, such as being violent, criminal, and anti-social (e.g., gang leaders).

=== Social-psychological characteristics ===
Many writers often highlight the social-psychological dimensions of the underclass. The underclass is often framed as holding beliefs, attitudes, opinions, and desires that are inconsistent with those held by society at large. The underclass is frequently described as a "discouraged" group with members who feel "cut off" from mainstream society. Linked to this discussion of the underclass being psychologically deviant, the underclass is also said to have low levels of cognition and literacy. Thus, the underclass is often seen as being mentally disconnected from the rest of society. Consider the following:

The underclass rejects many of the norms and values of the larger society. Among underclass youth, achievement motivation is low, education is undervalued, and conventional means of success and upward mobility are scorned. There is widespread alienation from society and its institutions, estrangement, social isolation, and hopelessness, the sense that a better life is simply not attainable through legitimate means.

=== Behavioral characteristics ===
Not only is the underclass frequently said to think differently, they are also said to behave differently. Some believe that the underclass concept was meant to capture the coincidence of a number of social ills including poverty, joblessness, crime, welfare dependence, fatherless families, and low levels of education or work related skills. These behavioral characteristics, coupled with arguments that the underclass is psychologically disconnected from mainstream society, are occasionally highlighted as evidence that the underclass live in a subculture of poverty. From this point of view, members of the underclass embody a distinct set of thoughts, perceptions, and actions - a "style of life" - that are transmitted across generations. However, just as the conceptualization of a "culture of poverty" in general is debated, so too are the attempts to frame the underclass as members of such a culture.

=== Ecological (spatial) characteristics ===
The ecological dimension, a fourth theme in the literature on the underclass, is often used as both a description and an explanation for the underclass. The underclass is concentrated in specific areas. Although there are some writings on the "rural underclass", in general the underclass is framed as an urban phenomenon and the phrases "ghetto poverty" and "inner-city poverty" are often used synonymously with the underclass term. However, many scholars are careful not to equate concentrated poverty with the underclass. Living in areas of concentrated poverty is more or less framed as a common (and often necessary) condition of the underclass, but it is generally not considered a sufficient condition since many conceptualizations of the underclass highlight behavioral and psychological deviancy that may not necessarily persist in high-poverty areas. In Wilson's writings on the underclass – a term he eventually replaces with "ghetto poverty" (see section titled "Critiques of the Underclass Concept")– the underclass is described as a population that is physically and socially isolated from individuals and institutions of mainstream society, and this isolation is one of a collection of causes to concentrated poverty and why the "social dislocations" (e.g., crime, school dropouts, out of wed-lock pregnancy, etc.) of the underclass emerge.

Thus, the underclass is defined and identified by multiple characteristics. Members are persistently poor and experience high levels of joblessness. However, these trends are generally not seen as sufficient identifiers of the underclass, because, for many, the underclass concept also captures dimensions of psychological and behavioral deviancy. The underclass is generally identified as an urban phenomenon with its members typically living in areas of concentrated poverty.

== Potential causes and proposed solutions ==
Similar to issues of defining and identifying the underclass, the outlining of potential causes and proposed solutions for the "underclass problem" have also been points of contestation. Debates concerning the diagnosis of, and prescription for, the underclass often mirror debates concerning first world poverty more generally. However, in many writings on the specific notion of the underclass, some particular causes and solutions have been set forth.

A few of these propositions are outlined below, including those developed by William Julius Wilson, Douglas Massey and Nancy Denton, Lawrence M. Mead, and Ken Auletta. The work by these authors' certainly do not compile an exhaustive list of suggested causes or solutions for the underclass, but they are arguably the most read proposals among social scientists. The contrasting causes and solutions highlighted by Wilson and Mead in particular have been popular points for debate. However, because prescription is dependent on diagnosis, much of the debates between Wilson and Mead have been on the causes and conditions of the underclass. Wilson highlights social isolation and the disappearance of quality work (for example, via deindustrialization and offshore labor outsourcing) for ghetto residents, while Mead highlights an overgenerous and permissive welfare state. Massey and Denton link the creation of the underclass to racial residential segregation and advocate for policies encouraging desegregation. Auletta provides a different policy framework discussion by highlighting two extreme positions (the wholesale option and the laissez-faire option) and one middle-of-the-road position (the retail option), but these are more discussions concerning the amount of public resources that should be dedicated to fixing, or attempting to fix, the underclass problem, rather than specific strategies. Auletta seems to support the retail option, which would provide aid to underclass members deserving and hopeful and withhold aid to members undeserving and hopeless.

=== Wilson's diagnosis and prescription ===
For Wilson, the cause of the underclass is structural. In The Truly Disadvantaged, Wilson highlights a conglomerate of factors in the last half of the twentieth century leading to a growing urban underclass. The factors listed include but are not limited to the shift from a goods-producing economy to a service-producing economy (including deindustrialization) and the offshore outsourcing of labor not only in the industrial sector but also in substantial portions of the remaining service sector. These factors are aggravated by the exodus of the middle and upper classes from the inner city (first the well-known "white flight" and later the less-studied departure of the black middle class), which creates a "spatial mismatch" between where low-income people live (inner-city neighborhoods) and where low-skill service-sector jobs are available (the suburbs). The result is the transformation of the post-civil-rights-era inner city into a "ghetto" whose residents are isolated from mainstream institutions.

Wilson proposes a comprehensive social and economic program that is primarily universal, but nevertheless includes targeted efforts to improve the life chances of the ghetto underclass and other disadvantaged groups. Wilson lists multiple examples of what this universal program would include, such as public funding of training, retraining, and transitional employment benefits that would be available to all members of society. With respect to the diagnosis of concentration and isolation, Wilson suggests the promotion of social mobility, through programs that will increase employment prospects for the underclass, will lead to geographic mobility. Wilson describes his proposed program as having a "hidden agenda" for policy makers "to improve the life chances of truly disadvantaged groups such as the ghetto underclass by emphasizing programs to which the more advantaged groups of all races and class backgrounds can positively relate". Universal programs are more easily accepted within the US' political climate than targeted programs, yet the underclass would likely experience the most benefit from universal programs. Wilson notes that some means-tested programs are still necessary, but recommends that they be framed as secondary to universal programming efforts. The following quote summarizes his policy call:

[T]he problems of the ghetto underclass can be most meaningfully addressed by a comprehensive program that combines employment policies with social welfare policies and that features universal as opposed to race- or group-specific strategies. On the one hand, this program highlights macroeconomic policy to generate a tight labor market and economic growth; fiscal and monetary policy not only to stimulate noninflationary growth, but also to increase the competitiveness of American goods on both the domestic and international market; and a national labor market strategy to make the labor force more adequate to changing economic opportunities. On the other hand, this program highlights a child support assurance program, a family allowance program, and a child care strategy.

=== Massey and Denton's diagnosis and prescription ===
In their 1993 book, American Apartheid, sociologists Douglas Massey and Nancy Denton concur with much of Wilson's suggested causes and proposed solutions, but introduce racial residential segregation (as an outcome of both institutionalized and individual-level discrimination) as an explanatory factor. Massey and Denton argue that racial residential segregation is primarily an outcome of institutionalized racism in real estate and banking, coupled with, and significantly motivated by, individual-level prejudice and discrimination. They provide the following summary,

Thus, although we share William Julius Wilson's view that the structural transformation of the economy played a crucial role in creating the urban underclass during the 1970's, we argue that what made it disproportionately a black underclass was racial segregation. The decline of manufacturing and the rise of a two-tiered service economy harmed many racial and ethnic groups, but only black Americans were highly segregated, so only among them was the resulting income loss confined to a small set of spatially contiguous and racially homogenous neighborhoods.

Given the prominent role of segregation in the construction and maintenance of the urban underclass, Massey and Denton call for policies that promote desegregation. They provide a detailed list of policy suggestions in the closing of their book. They argue that policies aimed at desegregation need to target the private housing market, where an overwhelming majority of housing is allocated. In doing this, the authors call upon the federal government to dedicate more resources to the upholding of the Fair Housing Act, including speedy judicial action against violators (to strengthen deterrent effects of the legislation).

=== Mead's diagnosis and prescription ===
Mead argues that the core cause of the underclass problem (or at least the perpetuation of the underclass problem) is welfare. Mead argues that most welfare programs encourage social dysfunctions, including welfare dependency, illegitimate births, joblessness, and crime. For Mead, welfare is too permissive and provides benefits to the underclass without requirements for its members to change their behavior and lifestyle.

Mead's diagnosis that permissive welfare is a primary cause of the underclass problem is followed by a prescription for a more authoritative welfare program that combines benefits with requirements. This proposal is often called "workfare", which requires welfare recipients to work in order to receive aid. For Mead, such a program design would evoke behavioral change since permissiveness is replaced with authority. Mead summarizes his call to replace permissive welfare with authoritative welfare:

The progressive tradition of extending new benefits and opportunities to the worst-off has made it next to impossible to address the behavioral difficulties at the bottom of society in their own terms. For to do that, authority, or the making of demands on people, would have to be seen as the tool, and not the butt, of policy.

=== Auletta's three typologies of solutions ===
Ken Auletta closes his book, The Underclass (1982), by highlighting three typologies of solutions: "the wholesale option", "the laissez-faire option", and "the retail option".

The "wholesale option" includes both conservatives and liberals who are optimistic that government action can solve the underclass problem. According to Auletta, left-wing wholesale proponents call for increased public aid while right-wing wholesale proponents call for government to reduce taxes to increase jobs (inspired by trickle-down economic theory) and charge the government to "get tough" on underclass crime and welfare dependency.

The "laissez-faire option" is pessimistic and its proponents are extremely wary of proposed solutions to a problem they see as unsolvable. Proponents of this perspective call for a drastic withdrawal of public aid for the underclass and are concerned with "quarantining the patient" instead of hunting for what they believe is an imaginary cure. In other words, the laissez-faire option assumes that the underclass is generally hopeless, and thus the only public effort given to them should be the bare minimum.

The "retail option" includes those in between optimism and pessimism, what Auletta calls "skeptics". The retail option advocates for targeted efforts, recognizing the limits of government intervention, but is also aware of the positive impact social policy can have on efforts to fix specific problems of the underclass. This middle ground perspective requests that aid be given to members of the underclass considered to be deserving of aid, but withheld from members considered to be undeserving. However, proponents of the retail option often disagree on which members of the underclass are considered deserving and which are not. This appears to be the approach embraced by Auletta as he closes his book with reflections on some of the people he interviews throughout preceding pages. He says, "I have no difficulty giving up on violent criminals like the Bolden brothers or street hustlers like Henry Rivera. But knowing how a government helping hand made it possible for Pearl Dawson and William Mason to succeed, would you be willing to write them off?"

== Journalism ==
Social scientists often point to journalism as a primary institution conceptualizing the underclass for a mass audience. Many suggest that the underclass terminology employed by American journalists in the last quarter of the twentieth-century were partial to behavioral and cultural—as opposed to a structural—definitions of the underclass.

While journalists' use of the underclass term is vast, a few popular sources are frequently cited in the academic literature on the underclass and journalism. Ken Auletta employed the underclass term in three articles published in The New Yorker in 1981, and in book form a year later. Auletta is arguably the most read journalist of the underclass and many of his ideas, including his definition of the underclass, are included in this Wikipedia entry.

Another notable journalist is Nicholas Lemann who published a handful of articles on the underclass in the Atlantic Monthly during the late 1980s and early 1990s. His 1986 writings on "The Origins of the Underclass" argue that the underclass was created by two migrations, the great migration of Southern blacks to the North and West during the early to mid twentieth century and the exodus of middle class blacks out of the ghetto during the 1970s through the early 90s. In 1991 Lemann also published an article titled "The Other Underclass", which details Puerto Ricans, and particularly Puerto Ricans residing in South Bronx, as members of the urban underclass in the US.

== Critiques of the concept ==
Following the popularization of the underclass concept in both academic and journalistic writings, some academics began to overtly criticize underclass terminology. Those in opposition to the underclass concept generally argue that, on the one hand, "underclass" is a homogenizing term that simplifies a heterogeneous group, and on the other hand, the term is derogatory and demonizes the urban poor.

=== Derogatory and demonizing language ===
Many who reject the underclass concept suggest that the underclass term has been transformed into a codeword to refer to poor inner-city blacks. For example, Hilary Silver highlights a moment when David Duke, former Grand Wizard of the KKK, campaigned for Louisiana Governor by complaining about the "welfare underclass". The underclass concept has been politicized, with those from the political left arguing that joblessness and insufficient welfare provided are causes of underclass conditions while the political right employ the underclass term to refer to welfare dependency and moral decline. Many sociologists suggest that this latter rhetoric – the right-wing perspective – became dominant in mainstream accounts of the underclass during the later decades of the twentieth-century.

Herbert Gans is one of the most vocal critics of the underclass concept. Gans suggests that American journalists, inspired partly by academic writings on the "culture of poverty", reframed underclass from a structural term (in other words, defining the underclass in reference to conditions of social/economic/political structure) to a behavioral term (in other words, defining the underclass in reference to rational choice and/or in reference to a subculture of poverty). Gans suggests that the word "underclass" has become synonymous with impoverished blacks that behave in criminal, deviant, or "just non-middle-class ways".

Loïc Wacquant deploys a relatively similar critique by arguing that underclass has become a blanket term that frames urban blacks as behaviorally and culturally deviant. Wacquant notes that underclass status is imposed on urban blacks from outside and above them (e.g., by journalists, politicians, and academics), stating that "underclass" is a derogatory and "negative label that nobody claims or invokes except to pin it on to others". And, although the underclass concepts is homogenizing, Wacquant argues that underclass imagery differentiates on gender lines, with the underclass male being depicted as a violent "gang banger", a physical threat to public safety, and the underclass female being generalized as "welfare mother" (also see welfare queen), a "moral assault on American values".

=== Homogenizing a heterogeneous group ===
The concept of 'the ghetto' and 'underclass' has also faced criticism empirically. Research has shown significant differences in resources for neighborhoods with similar populations both across cities and over time. This includes differences in the resources of neighborhoods with predominantly low income and/or racial minority populations. The cause of these differences in resources across similar neighborhoods has more to do with dynamics outside of the neighborhood. To a large extent the problem with the 'ghetto' and 'underclass' concepts stem from the reliance on case studies (in particular case studies from Chicago), which confine social scientist understandings of socially disadvantaged neighborhoods.

=== Proposed replacement terms ===
The charges against underclass terminology have motivated replacement terms. For example, William Julius Wilson, sympathetic to criticisms brought against underclass terminology (particularly those criticisms posited by Gans), begins to replace his use of the term underclass with "ghetto poor" during the early 1990s. For Wilson, this replacement terminology is simply an attempt to revamp the framing of inner-city poverty as being structurally rooted. He states, "I will substitute the term 'ghetto poor' for the term 'underclass' and hope that I will not lose any of the subtle theoretical meaning that the latter term has had in my writings."

== See also ==
- Burakumin
- Consumtariat
- Ghetto
- Dalit
- Infrahumanisation
- Involuntary unemployment
- Lumpenproletariat
- New class
- Overclass
- Peasant
- Poverty
- Precariat
- Reserve army of labour
- Serfdom
- Slavery
- Social class
- Social exclusion
- Social hierarchy
- Social inequality
- White trash
- Untermensch
- Untouchability
