= Hills v. Gautreaux =

- Supreme Court of the United States

Argued January 20, 1976 Decided April 20, 1976
- Full case name: Hills, Secretary of Housing and Urban Development v Gautreaux et al.
- Citations: 425 U.S. 284 (more) 96 S. Ct. 1538; 47 L. Ed. 2d 792

Case history
- Prior: Appeal from the United States Court of Appeals for the Seventh Circuit

Holding
- Racially discriminatory public housing programs violate the 5th Amendment and Civil Rights Act of 1964, and remedial action to alleviate the effects of such a practice not only is appropriate but also extends beyond city limits to the housing market of the city.

Court membership
- Chief Justice Warren E. Burger Associate Justices William J. Brennan Jr. · Potter Stewart; Byron White · Thurgood Marshall; Harry Blackmun · Lewis F. Powell Jr. William Rehnquist · John P. Stevens

Case opinions
- Majority: Stewart, joined by Burger, Brennan, White, Marshall, Blackmun, Powell, Rehnquist
- Concurrence: Marshall, joined by Brennan, White
- Stevens took no part in the consideration or decision of the case.

Laws applied
- U.S. Const. Amend. V; Civil Rights Act of 1964

Hills v. Gautreaux, 425 U.S. 284 (1976), was a decision of the United States Supreme Court.

In this case, a number of Chicago families living in housing projects were awarded Section 8 vouchers allowing them to move to the suburbs in compensation for the housing project's substandard conditions. Carla Anderson Hills was the United States Secretary of Housing and Urban Development; the eponymous lead respondent was Dorothy Gautreaux (1927–1968). The court ruled that the department had violated the Fifth Amendment and the Civil Rights Act of 1964.

The significance of the case lies in the sociological conclusions that can be drawn from the natural experiment that ensued. A number of families chose to move, while others stayed, and Northwestern University researchers studying the two populations concluded that low-income women who moved to the suburbs "clearly experienced improved employment and earnings, even though the program provided no job training or placement services." The disparity arguably proves that concentrated poverty is self-perpetuating and simply alleviating this concentration offers an avenue for improving the quality of life of those affected by urban poverty.

== 2024 settlement extension ==
In 2019, a settlement was reached in Hills v. Gautreaux requiring the Chicago Housing Authority (CHA) to continue developing scattered site housing, improve the housing voucher mobility program, and complete mixed-income housing projects. The settlement also included creating early childhood development programs at four public housing sites. Initially set for five years, the settlement allowed for court intervention if CHA failed to meet its obligations. Recently, both parties returned to court, agreeing that requirements remain unmet at six development projects, according to a joint motion filed on July 30, 2024.

The amendment outlines the remaining requirements at six CHA developments: Altgeld Gardens, Lakefront Properties, Madden/Wells, Rockwell Gardens, Stateway Gardens, and Robert Taylor Homes. At each of the six sites, certain terms of the 2019 settlement agreement will remain in place up to three additional years, or less time if the parties agree that CHA has completed the requirements sooner. All other terms expired on July 31, 2024.

== See also ==
- List of United States Supreme Court cases, volume 425
- Office of Fair Housing and Equal Opportunity
