= Universal Living Wage =

US campaign for a flexible living wage

National Locality Wage, (formerly Universal Living Wage - ULW), is an ongoing campaign, launched by Richard R. Troxell, to revise the federal minimum wage and its random selection of a wage rate that causes economic homelessness across the United States.

It is based on a formula crafted in 1997 intended to fix the federal minimum wage and shift it from the current practice of one wage amount for the entire United States to a system that indexes the minimum wage to the local cost of housing.

The National Locality Wage mathematical formula and concept were crafted using a three-pronged approach using existing government guidelines:

1. Work a 40-hour week
2. Spend no more than 30% of one's monthly budget on housing
3. Utilizing the Section 8 Fair Market Rent in the area where the work is done.

The formula ensures that any individual working 40 hours per week (be it from one or more jobs) will be able to afford basic food, clothing, shelter (an efficiency apartment), and public transportation, wherever that work is done throughout the United States. This creates a cost of living standard.

Troxell claims that the prior Congressional practice of picking a politically-based wage amount with no connection to any measure or standard lacks justification and often results in homelessness even for full-time minimum wage workers. Troxell claims that failure to index or link this national wage to any relative measure such as the cost of living or the cost of housing (seen as the single most expensive item in the budget of every American) will continue to result in a less than living wage amount, whereas implementing the National Locality Wage standard would end economic homelessness for over a third of those currently experiencing homelessness. Allowing more people to afford homes could also trigger the construction of new housing.

The National Locality Wage Formula is used by Just Economics and Orange County Living Wage.

In 2002, the City of Austin and Travis County adopted a resolution in support of a National Locality Wage (formerly Universal Living Wage), at the federal level. The project is also endorsed by the Hunger Action Network.
