= Source of income discrimination =

Form of discrimination in housing services

Source of income discrimination describes when landlords refuse to rent to tenants using housing vouchers or other government assistance. Housing advocates argue the practice keeps vulnerable communities from accessing housing, although landlords point to lack of protections for tenants as their right to refuse service.

== United States ==
In the United States, housing vouchers fall under Section 8 of the Housing Act of 1937. Section 8 housing vouchers provide housing assistance for low-income, elderly, and disabled individuals or families. The term “source of income discrimination” is used by housing advocates to describe a phenomenon that is legal nationwide in the United States but is increasingly being banned on the state and city level. Participation in the Section 8 Housing Voucher Program is largely voluntary for landlords. The Biden Administration acknowledged the practice is currently legal federally but promised to address the issue. State laws banning source of income discrimination vary widely with some including protections for tenants using section 8 housing vouchers and some not. Advocates, such as the NAACP, argue renters have been unfairly denied usage of their housing voucher and that acceptance of housing vouchers leads to more diverse communities.

=== State Policies ===
23 states, California, Colorado, Connecticut, Delaware, Hawaii, Illinois, Iowa, Maine, Maryland, Massachusetts, Michigan, Minnesota*, New Jersey, New York, North Dakota, Oklahoma*, Oregon, Rhode Island, Utah, Vermont, Virginia, Washington, and Wisconsin*, have statewide policies banning source of income discrimination.

Indiana, Texas, Idaho, Iowa, and Kentucky preempt the passage of source of income discrimination laws; however, city ordinances may differ. Phoenix, Arizona passed an ordinance in March 2023 banning source of income discrimination.

*Excludes section 8 housing

=== Background ===
There are more than two million households in the United States that participate in the Section 8 Housing Choice Voucher Program (the Section 8 voucher program) to afford privately owned rental housing.

When a Section 8 voucher participant rents from a participating landlord, the local PHA “pays the difference between the household’s contribution (set at 30 percent of income) and the total monthly rent.” The Section 8 voucher program does not set a maximum rent, but participants must pay the difference between the calculated subsidy and actual rent. Landlords receive the subsidy directly from the PHAs.

=== Examples of discrimination ===
In the first study, in the early 1980s, 50 percent of the Section 8 Housing Voucher participants were able to find housing. This number increased to 68 percent from 1985 to 1987. There was a rise to 81 percent by 1993. However, the figures dropped to 69% success in 2000. The low success rates can be attributed to landlords declining to accept the vouchers either because of discrimination against the participants in the program or because of the burdens the program places on housing providers.

In a study conducted by U. S. Department of Housing and Urban Development, researchers examined the landlord denial rate of individuals with a housing voucher in neighborhoods with varying poverty rates. The researchers found that in areas where people with vouchers are considered a protected class, the denial rates are significantly lower. The areas with less outright denial of people with vouchers often tend to be the neighborhoods with higher poverty rates. Specifically, denial rates were 11 to 27 percent higher in low-poverty tracts compared to high-poverty tracts.

In addition, while the refusal to accept the vouchers appears racially neutral on its face, many housing advocates contend that the acceptability and legality of Section 8 discrimination enable landlords to use it as a proxy for other legally prohibited kinds of discrimination, such as that based on race, ethnicity, national origin, gender, family status, or disability. For example, studies show that the discrimination against Section 8 voucher holders increases if the recipient is African American or Latino. Because of discrimination against voucher holders, many subsidy recipients can only find housing in neighborhoods where they already are in the racial majority.

=== Disparate impact claims ===
One way in which discriminated parties have dealt with discrimination is by bringing disparate impact claims. In disparate impact claims, a prima facie case of discrimination is established by showing that the challenged practice of the defendant actually or predictably results in racial discrimination. This analysis focuses on facially neutral policies that may have a discriminatory effect. Federal courts will allow claims to be made under the FHA on a disparate impact theory by analogizing the FHA to Title VII because they both share a goal of reducing discrimination.

However, courts are dividing on how they rule when it comes to allowing disparate impact claims under the FHA for voucher discrimination. A few federal courts have allowed plaintiffs who were denied housing because of their vouchers to assert these claims. Other courts have limited or prohibited them. Thus, the courts are not uniform when it comes to addressing disparate impact claims for voucher discrimination. Without more legal protections, voucher discrimination can continue, and the Section 8 Housing Voucher Program can be in danger of not meeting its intended goal of increasing the quantity of options and quality of housing for low-income individuals and families.

== See also ==
- Class discrimination
- Housing discrimination (in the United States)
- Housing segregation (in the United States)
- Homelessness (in the United States)
- Housing insecurity
- Landlord
- Landlord-Tenant Law
- Rent controls
- Right to housing
- Tenants union
