= Lawrence Mead =

American academic (born 1943)

Lawrence M. Mead
- Born: June 6, 1943 (age 83); Huntington, New York
- Education: Amherst College (B.A., 1966); Harvard University (M.A., 1968; Ph.D., 1973)
- Occupation: Political scientist
- Employer: New York University
- Known for: Arguing that employment is an obligation of citizenship.
- Notable work: Beyond Entitlement: The Social Obligations of Citizenship, The New Politics of Poverty: The Nonworking Poor in America
- Title: Professor of Politics and Public Policy
- Political party: Republican

Lawrence M. Mead III (born 1943) is a professor of politics and public policy at New York University (NYU).

== Education ==
Born in Huntington, New York, Mead graduated Phi Beta Kappa with a B.A. from Amherst College in 1966, and from Harvard University with an M.A. and Ph.D. in 1968 and 1973.

== Career ==
Mead has taught at New York University (NYU) since 1979. He has been a visiting professor at the University of Wisconsin (1987), Harvard University (1993–4) and Princeton University (1994–5). He was a visiting fellow at Princeton (1995–6, 2001–2) and the Hoover Institution at Stanford (1988). Mead was deputy director of Research for the Republican National Committee in 1978–79, a research associate at the Urban Institute from 1975 to 1978, a speechwriter to Secretary of State Henry Kissinger in 1974–75, and a policy analyst at the U.S. Department of Health, Education, and Welfare from 1973 to 1975.

Mead has written on poverty and welfare in the United States. In the books he wrote between 1986 and 2004, he provided the main theoretical basis for the American welfare reform of the 1990s, which required adult welfare recipients to work as a condition of aid. His books have influenced welfare reform in Europe, Australia, and New Zealand.

Mead has written six books, coauthored three books, and edited or co-edited two others, all on poverty and/or government welfare policies. Government Matters, his study of welfare reform in Wisconsin, was a co-winner of the 2005 Louis Brownlow Book Award, given by the National Academy of Public Administration. Mead has published dozens of articles on poverty, welfare, program implementation, and related subjects in scholarly journals, such as the Journal of Policy Analysis and Management, Public Administration Review, The Public Interest and the Annals of the American Academy of Political and Social Science. His book reviews and commentaries have appeared in The New York Times, The Washington Post, and other outlets.

=== Theories on welfare and poverty ===
Mead believes that welfare should be means-tested, so as to encourage behaviors among aid recipients to alleviate their poverty. According to Mead, extreme poverty is more commonly found in minority groups not because of a lack of work ethic. Rather, he argues that their belief in work unfortunately does not sufficiently bind their actions. This assessment is identical to JD Vance's assessment of poor, white Appalachians in his book Hillbilly Elegy. Hence, Mead argues "[t]he ideal in welfare... is to link benefits as tightly as possible to work. That requires a clear work test that employable recipients must meet as soon as they apply for aid, not sometime later. Equally important, there must be ample benefits to support working, particularly child and health care."

On July 21, 2020, Mead published a commentary in the journal Society titled "Poverty and Culture" based on ideas from his 2019 book Burdens of Freedom but also found in his 1983 book, Beyond Entitlement. In the paper, he wrote that extreme poverty is found amongst Black and Hispanic people in the United States more often than white people because they "typically respond only weakly to chances to get ahead through education and work" due to cultural differences in adapting to the United States' "individualist culture", a culture he posits derives from Europe. He repeated his hypothesis that while impoverished minorities do value work, their values do not sufficiently guide their actions. The paper drew widespread outrage from the academic community for allegedly perpetuating racist, xenophobic and classist stereotypes, and multiple petitions circulated requesting a retraction. NYU issued a statement expressing its rejection of "false, prejudicial, and stigmatizing assertions about the culture of communities of color in the United States" in his paper. The journal publisher launched an investigation, and on July 31 the editor-in-chief retracted the paper and apologized for publishing it.

== Books ==
Books authored

- Mead, Lawrence M. (1986). Beyond Entitlement: The Social Obligations of Citizenship. New York: Free Press. ISBN 978-0-7432-2495-6.
- Mead, Lawrence M. (1993). The New Politics of Poverty: The Nonworking Poor in America. New York: Basic Books. ISBN 978-0-465-05069-7.
- Mead, Lawrence M. (2004). Government Matters: Welfare Reform in Wisconsin. Princeton, NJ: Princeton University Press. ISBN 978-0-691-12380-6.
- Mead, Lawrence M. (2011). From Prophecy to Charity: How to Help the Poor. Washington, DC: AEI Press. ISBN 978-0844743806.
- Mead, Lawrence M. (2011). Expanding Work Programs for Poor Men. Washington, DC: AEI Press. ISBN 978-0844743974.
- Mead, Lawrence M. (2019). Burdens of Freedom. Princeton, NJ: Encounter Books. ISBN 978-1641770408.

Books co-authored

- Bane, Mary Jo; Mead, Lawrence M. (2003). Lifting Up the Poor: A Dialogue on Religion, Poverty & Welfare Reform. Washington, DC: Brookings Institution Press. ISBN 978-0-8157-0791-2.

Edited

- Mead, Lawrence M.; Deacon, Alan, eds. (1997). From Welfare to Work: Lessons from America. London, UK: Institute of Economic Affairs. ISBN 978-0-255-36399-0.
- Mead, Lawrence M., ed. (1997). The New Paternalism: Supervisory Approaches to Poverty. Washington, DC: Brookings Institution Press. ISBN 978-0-8157-5651-4.
- Mead, Lawrence M.; Beem, Christopher, eds. (2007). Welfare Reform and Political Theory. New York: Russell Sage Foundation Publications. ISBN 978-0-87154-588-6.
