= Journal of Housing Economics =

- Discipline: Economics
- Language: English
- Edited by: Paul E. Carrillo, Henry Pollakowski; Daniel Hartley, Jeffrey Zabel

Publication details
- History: 1991-present
- Publisher: Elsevier
- Frequency: Quarterly
- Impact factor: 1.705 (2020)

Standard abbreviations
- ISO 4: J. Hous. Econ.

Indexing
- CODEN: JHECFB
- ISSN: 1051-1377 (print); 1096-0791 (web)
- LCCN: 91642706
- OCLC no.: 21878213

Links
- Journal homepage; Online archive

The Journal of Housing Economics is a quarterly peer-reviewed academic journal covering housing economics. It was established in 1991 and is published by Elsevier. The editors-in-chief are Paul E. Carrillo (George Washington University), and Henry Pollakowski (Harvard University), and it is co-edited by Daniel Hartley (Federal Reserve Bank of Chicago) and Jeffrey Zabel (Tufts University). According to the Journal Citation Reports, the journal has a 2020 impact factor of 1.705.
