= Moving to Opportunity =

1990s American social experiment on low-income families

Moving to Opportunity for Fair Housing (MTO) was a randomized social experiment sponsored by the United States Department of Housing and Urban Development (HUD) in the 1990s among 4,600 low-income families with children living in high-poverty public housing projects.

== Study design ==
Families who volunteered to participate in the program were randomly assigned to 3 groups. One group received housing vouchers that could be used only in low-poverty areas for the first year as well as counseling to help them find units there. After a year, they could use their vouchers anywhere. One group received vouchers that could be used anywhere but no counseling. A third (control) group did not receive vouchers but remained eligible for any other government assistance to which they otherwise would have been entitled. A vast majority of the participating families were headed by African-American or Hispanic single mothers. The demonstration was implemented by public housing authorities in Baltimore, Boston, Chicago, Los Angeles, and New York City.

== Evaluations and findings ==
Publications based on the demonstration have been numerous. Interim findings appeared in 2003, and final findings were released in 2011. A special issue of the HUD publication Cityscape in 2012 was largely devoted to the experiment.

The congressional mandate authorizing the demonstration directed evaluation of its impacts on the housing, earnings, and education of the family members in the treatment groups. Researchers found that voucher recipients lived in lower-crime neighborhoods and generally had better units than the control group families, but the experiment had no impact on educational attainment. Effects on employment were diverse among cites. ^{p. 151} Compared with the control group, employment was smaller among voucher recipient during first 2 years. ^{p. 149} The drop could be an effect of disruptions of social networks resulting in increased difficulty in finding work and arrange informal and affordable child care. ^{p. 140} The initial negative effects attenuated over time, but there were no statistically significant gains in longer-term employment rates and earnings. ^{p 257} It did, however, have unexpected results in health and happiness. Parents in families who moved to low-poverty areas had lower rates of obesity and depression, and positive impacts on behavior and outlook among young women (but not young men) were also noted.

In 2010, Xavier de Souza Briggs, Susan J. Popkin and John Goering published "Moving to Opportunity: The Story of an American Experiment to Fight Ghetto Poverty". Their ethnographic work, conducted with financial support from HUD, adds an in-depth qualitative dimension to the experiment's findings by relating the stories of the families involved. They examine for example the difference between helping families leave neighborhoods with concentrated poverty and helping families "escape poverty", the difference between networks of survival and networks of mobility, and the different meanings or understandings of what makes a community: "Those who planned the MTO experiment believed it could reduce the "social isolation" that was, argued leading scholars, a core feature of life in segregated, high-poverty ghetto neighborhoods". Further they report that few of the families enrolled in MTO reported having ties with their new neighbors by the interim evaluation, which they attribute to this conflating of neighborhood and community: "MTO families almost never "converted" a new location into significant new social resources. This thwarted hopes that relocation away from ghetto neighborhoods would generate better access to information about good housing, schools, jobs, and other opportunities."

In 2015, Harvard economists Raj Chetty, Nathaniel Hendren, and Lawrence Katz presented their work on the longer-term results of MTO. This was the first study to find strong evidence that the program caused economic gains, with children who moved from high-poverty areas to low-poverty areas when they were less than 13 years old enjoying mean incomes nearly a third higher than children who did not move. The study also finds that children who moved when they were older than 13 years old fell behind their peers who stayed in high-poverty areas. This is attributed to the disruptive effects of a move later in adolescence and less time for the benefits of living in a low-poverty area to manifest themselves.

== Criticism ==
A critique in the Du Bois Review (2004) by Arline Geronimus and J. Phillip Thompson calls the Moving to Opportunity study "politically naive". Their study theorizes that moving a family into a higher income neighborhood might solve immediate, direct health risks (for example clean water, less crime) however the loss of social integration, stress factors, and racially influenced disparities, would likely mitigate any short term improvements. According to Geronimus and Thompson the premise of the MTO program does not address root causes of poverty, does not reduce toxic stress, and especially "falls short of addressing the racism that led to Black urban ghettos."
