= Section 8 of the Housing Act of 1937 =

Part of the Housing Act of 1937 (US)

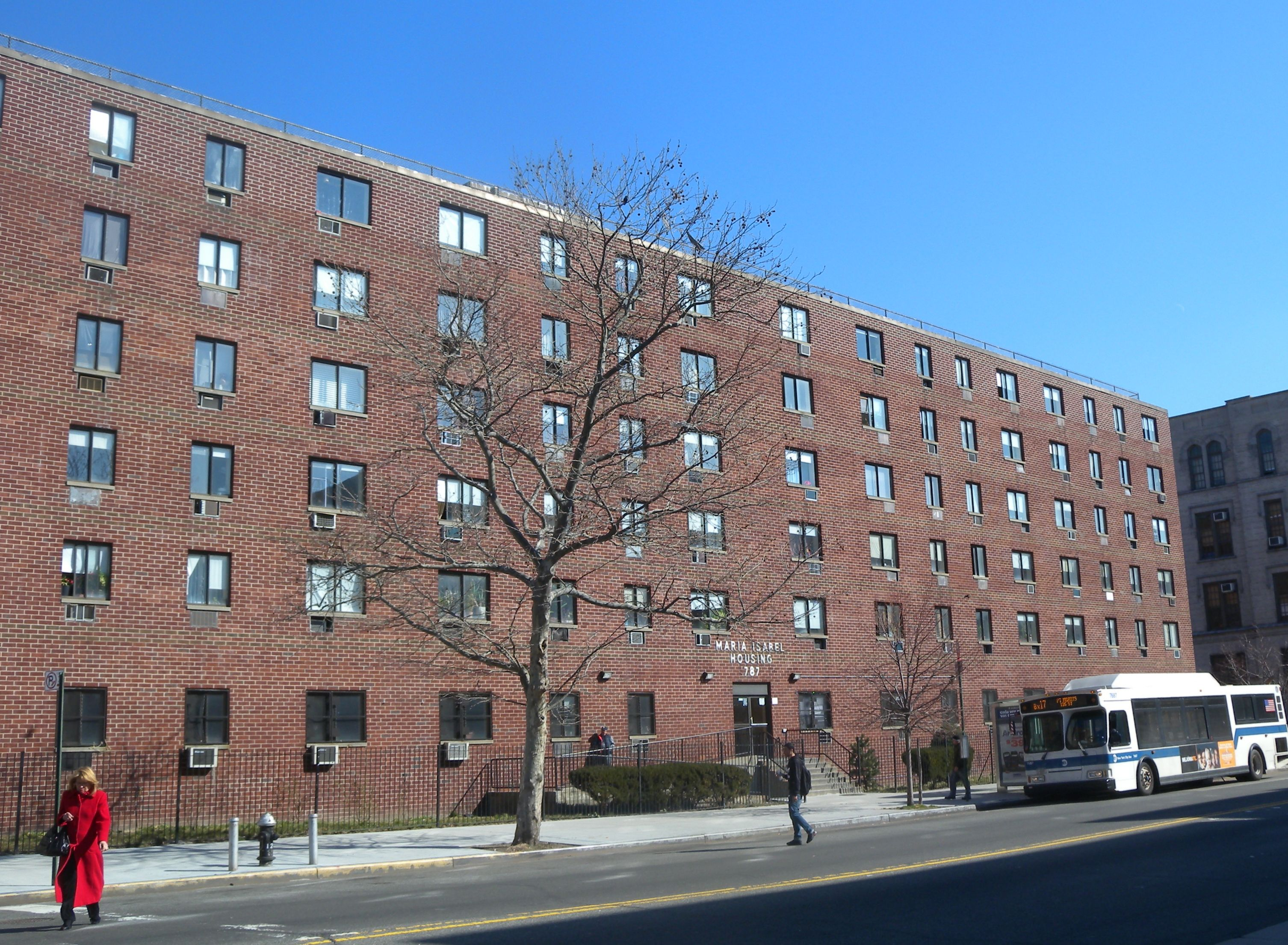
Maria Isabel Housing is an assisted living apartment building for seniors in the Bronx borough of New York City that receives support under Section 8 of the Housing Act.

Section 8 of the Housing Act of 1937 (42 U.S.C. § 1437f), commonly known as Section 8, provides rental housing assistance to low-income households in the United States by paying private landlords on behalf of these tenants. Approximately 68% of this assistance benefits seniors, people in families with children, and individuals with disabilities. The Department of Housing and Urban Development (HUD) oversees Section 8 programs, which are administered locally by public housing agencies (PHAs).

In 2022, about 2.3 million out of the 5.2 million households receiving rental assistance used Section 8 vouchers. While landlord participation in the program is voluntary in most areas, some states and municipalities have enacted laws that prohibit source of income discrimination, including discrimination against individuals whose income is derived from Section 8 housing vouchers. Voucher amounts vary depending on city or county, size of unit, and other factors. Voucher recipients typically have two to four months to secure housing that meets HUD standards; otherwise, they lose their vouchers and must reapply. Wait lists for vouchers can be very long, averaging 28 months but ranging up to 10 years in large cities, with many local programs closed to new applicants.

Voucher amounts are based on Fair Market Rents (FMRs) set by HUD. The recently introduced Small Area Fair Market Rents (SAFMRs) program refines these calculations to the zip code level in major metropolitan areas.

== History ==
Federal housing assistance programs started during the Great Depression. In the 1960s and 1970s, the federal government created subsidy programs to increase the production of low-income housing and to help families pay their rent. In 1965, the Section 236 Leased Housing Program amended the U.S. Housing Act. This subsidy program, the predecessor to the modern program, was not a pure housing allowance program. Housing authorities selected eligible families from their waiting list, placed them in housing from a master list of available units, and determined the rent that tenants would have to pay. The housing authority would then sign a lease with the private landlord and pay the difference between the tenant's rent and the market rate for the same size unit. In the agreement with the private landlord, housing authorities agreed to perform regular building maintenance and leasing functions for Section 236 tenants, and annually reviewed the tenant's income for program eligibility and rent calculations.

The Housing and Urban Development Act of 1970 introduced the federal Experimental Housing Allowance Program (EHAP) and the Community Development Corporation and authorized larger outlays for housing subsidy programs and rent supplements for moderate-income households.

In the 1970s, when studies showed that the worst housing problem afflicting low-income people was no longer substandard housing, but the high percentage of income spent on housing, Congress passed the Housing and Community Development Act of 1974, further amending the U.S. Housing Act of 1937 to create the Section 8 Program. In the Section 8 Program, tenants pay about 30 percent of their income for rent, while the rest of the rent is paid with federal money.

Since its inception, some Section 8 programs have been phased out and new ones created, although Congress has always renewed existing subsidies. The Section 8 program initially had three subprograms: New Construction, Substantial Rehabilitation, and Existing Housing Certificate programs. The Moderate Rehabilitation Program was added in 1978 and the Voucher Program in 1983. The number of units a local housing authority can subsidize under its Section 8 programs is determined by Congressional funding.

In 1998, the Quality Housing and Work Responsibility Act (QHWRA) combined the earlier Section 8 voucher program and the certificate programs into a single housing choice voucher (HCV) program, merging those tenant-based assistance streams into a single, voucher-style system. The updated HCV adopted the payment-standard approach (permitting tenants to lease units above the fair market rent if they cover the difference) and capped participant rent contributions at 30–40% of income. The law created the Project-Based Voucher (PBV) option. Starting in 2000, QHWRA also allowed HUD to allow certain PHAs to establish the Housing Choice Voucher Homeownership Program, which permits HCV holders to apply their subsidy toward homeownership costs, such as mortgage payments.

The 2008 Consolidated Appropriations Act (Public Law 110-161) enacted December 26, 2007, allocated $75 million in funding for the HUD-Veterans Affairs Supportive Housing (HUD-VASH) voucher program, authorized under section 8(o)(19) of the United States Housing Act of 1937. This new program combines HUD Housing Choice Voucher rental assistance for homeless veterans with case management and clinical service support which is provided by the Veterans Affairs administration at its own medical centers and also in the community.

The Housing Opportunity Through Modernization Act of 2016 (HOTMA) was signed into law on July 29, 2016, and amended the United States Housing Act of 1937 and made changes to several federal housing programs, particularly Section 8. Key provisions include reforms to income calculation methods, adjustments to asset limits, and modifications to the income review processes.

== Summary ==
The primary component of the Section 8 program is the Housing Choice Voucher (HCV) program. A voucher can be either project-based or tenant-based. Project-based vouchers are tied to a specific housing unit or complex, and their use is restricted to that location. PHAs can allocate up to 20% of their vouchers for this purpose. In contrast, tenant-based vouchers are assigned to the individual recipient, allowing them to choose a rental unit in the private market. This type of voucher provides greater mobility, as tenants are not limited to specific complexes and may "port" (transfer) their voucher to another PHA's jurisdiction, enabling them to reside anywhere in the United States or its territories where a Section 8 program is in operation.

Under the voucher program, individuals or families with a voucher find and lease a unit (either in a specified complex or in the private sector) and pay a portion of the rent. Most households pay 30% of their adjusted income for Section 8 housing. Adjusted income is a household's gross (total) income minus deductions for dependents under 18 years of age, full-time students, disabled persons, or an elderly household, and certain disability assistance and medical expenses.

There is an asset test in addition to earned income. Over a certain amount, HUD will add income even if the Section 8 tenant does not receive any interest income from, for example, a bank account. HUD calls this "imputed income from assets" and, in the case of a bank account, HUD establishes a standard "Passbook Savings Rate" to calculate the imputed income from the asset. By increasing the amount of a tenant's total income, the amount of imputed income from assets may affect a tenant's assigned portion of rent.

The PHA pays the landlord the remainder of the rent. Each year, the federal government looks at the rents being charged for privately owned apartments in different communities, as well as the costs of utilities (heat, electricity, etc.) in those communities. The Fair Market Rents (FMRs) are amounts (rents plus utilities) for medium-quality apartments of different sizes in a particular community. As an example, the 2012 FMR for 1 bedroom housing in San Francisco is $1,522 and in New York is $1,280, while in many other places it is less than $500.

The landlord cannot charge a Section 8 tenant more than a reasonable rent and cannot accept payments outside the contract.

Landlords, although required to meet fair housing laws, are not required to participate in the Section 8 program in most areas. As a result, some landlords will not accept a Section 8 tenant. This can be attributed to such factors as:

- not wanting the government involved in their business, such as having a full inspection of their premises by government workers for HUD's Housing Quality Standards (HQS) and the possible remediations required
- a desire to charge rent for the unit above FMR

Depending on state and local laws, refusing to rent to a tenant solely for the reason that they have Section 8 may be illegal. Landlords can use only general means of disqualifying a tenant (credit, criminal history, past evictions, etc.). It also may be illegal to post "No Section 8" advertisements.

However, other landlords willingly accept Section 8 tenants, due to:

- a large available pool of potential renters (the waiting list for new Section 8 tenants is usually very long, see below)
- Regular and generally prompt payments from the PHA for its share of the rent
- tenants' incentive to take good care of the property (PHAs require that tenants not damage rental properties. In many instances a tenant may be removed from the program if they owe money to a previous landlord).

Whether voucher- or project-based, all subsidized units must meet the HQS, thus ensuring that the family has a healthy and safe place to live. This improvement in the landlord's private property is an important byproduct of this program, both for the individual families and for the larger goal of community development.

=== Applicants ===
Applicants may apply for a Section 8 housing voucher at any county or city housing authority office. Although rules vary across housing authorities, residents of a particular area who receive a voucher from the jurisdiction in which they live may use the voucher anywhere in the country, but nonresidents of the jurisdiction must live in the jurisdiction that issues the voucher to them for 12 months before they can move to a different area.

In many localities, the PHA waiting lists for Section 8 vouchers may be thousands of households long, waits of three to six years to obtain vouchers are common, and many lists are closed to new applicants. Wait lists are often briefly opened (often for just five days), which may occur as little as once every seven years. To manage excess demand, PHAs often create preference policies that place specific categories of applicants at the top of wait lists. Some PHAs also use a "lottery" approach, where there can be as many as 100,000 applicants for 10,000 spots on the waitlist, with spots being awarded on the basis of weighted or non-weighted lotteries. Priority is often extended to local residents, disabled people, veterans, and the elderly. There is no guarantee that anyone will ever be selected from a wait list.

=== Family obligations ===
Families who participate in the program must abide by a series of rules and regulations, often referred to as "family obligations", in order to maintain their voucher, including accurately reporting to the PHA all changes in household income and family composition so the amount of their subsidy (and the applicable rental unit size limitation) can be updated accordingly.

== Fair Market Rents ==
Fair Market Rents (FMRs) are calculated to determine how much a landlord is able to accept for rent of a unit to a Section 8 voucher recipient. FMRs are gross rental rates and dictate the maximum rental rate to be agreed upon in a lease document. The calculation of FMRs is based on a standard quality rent from the five year American Community Survey, as well as a recent mover adjustment, which is the relationship between the standard quality for five years and the one year recent mover rents. FMRs also include a CPI adjustment and a trend factor adjustment. The trend factor adjustment is how HUD expects rental rates to grow.

FMRs include all major utilities (heat, electricity, etc.), but does not include telephone, cable, satellite television, or internet service. Utilities are included in FMRs whether the obligation of payment is under the tenant or the landlord. FMRs can be found using HUD's Database.

=== Small Area Fair Market Rents ===
The Small Area Fair Market Rents Program (SAFMRP) was officially implemented by HUD in January 2017. This system is an update to the system HUD uses to calculate Fair Market Rents (FMRs) in metropolitan areas. The purpose is to examine metropolitan area FMRs by ZIP code, as opposed to in total. HUD stated that this program is aimed to allow voucher recipients to move into higher opportunity areas and reduce the concentration of voucher recipients in a given metropolitan area. While the program was originally intended to be mandatory for several metropolitan areas immediately, the requirement for the use of SAFRMs was delayed to October 1, 2019. SAFMRs can now be found through the HUD database.

The implementation of this program follows a demonstration project coordinated by HUD in 2010. The project included the following Public Housing Authorities (PHAs): The Housing Authority of the County of Cook (IL), the City of Long Beach (CA) Housing Authority, the Chattanooga (TN) Housing Authority, the Town of Mamaroneck (NY) Housing Authority, and the Housing Authority of Laredo (TX).

An early report states that the effects of this program need to be analyzed over a long period of time before determining results. Vincent Reina, Arthur Acolin, and Raphael W. Bostic published an early examination of the new SAFMRP in 2019. This study finds varied results in the SAFMRP based on different metropolitan areas. Two areas of note are the highest performing city in the study and the lowest, Dallas, TX, and Chattanooga, TN, respectively. The authors argue that Dallas performed well with the SAFMRP because the city was required by court order to implement the program, and the program has been in place for longer than all other cities in the study. The authors state that the benefits of the SAFMRP change over time and analysis of the program must include a time series analysis for all effects.

The authors also explain why Chattanooga, TN may have performed the lowest in the study. Two reasons include the fact that most rental units were already inaccessible areas, and most residential areas in Chattanooga are low opportunity, therefore voucher recipients did not have increased choice with the implementation of the program.

== Earned Income Disallowance ==
There was a provision for disabled people who have a Section 8 subsidized dwelling to have their rent frozen for a specified time if they are working part-time below a certain income level. This was called the Earned Income Disallowance or Earned Income Disregard (EID) and was stipulated under US 24 CFR 5.617, "Self-sufficiency incentives for persons with disabilities—Disallowance of increase in annual income". This was enacted as part of the Quality Housing and Work Responsibility Act of 1998 (QHWRA) (Sec. 508(b); 42 U.S.C. 1437a(d)). This required PHAs and some owners, in calculating rent, to temporarily "disregard" increased income earned when certain public housing residents and disabled participants in certain housing assistance programs return/go to work or job-related programs. The idea was to foster self-sufficiency for those who are on subsidies and disability and other assistance. In 2023, HUD announced the elimination of the EID provision for new precipitants as part of implementing HOTMA.

== Criticism and Implementation Challenges ==
The Housing Choice Voucher Program has been critiqued for its limited reach and administrative complexity. Nationally, only one in four income-eligible households receives a voucher due to constrained funding. In major metropolitan areas, waitlists can remain closed for years, with some applicants waiting over a decade. The Urban Institute notes that universal voucher expansion could "reduce poverty and racial disparities in housing," suggesting current program limits on equity goals.

Landlord participation is another implementation challenge. Many landlords decline to accept vouchers because of issues like delayed inspections, administrative requirements, or uncertainty about timely payments. Some jurisdictions have enacted source‑of‑income protections that prohibit denying tenancy based on voucher status, but enforcement and landlord compliance vary widely by late 2022, only about 57% of voucher households were in jurisdictions with such laws. Consequently, voucher recipients are generally concentrated in high‑poverty neighborhoods with limited access to transportation, education, and employment opportunities.

Voucher holders also face significant barriers to geographic mobility, which may limit access to neighborhoods with higher-performing schools, lower crime rates, and greater economic opportunity. Although the program is intended to enable choice, recipients often encounter issues such as limited payment standards, landlord reluctance in higher‑opportunity areas, and administrative burdens that inhibit mobility_{.}

== Studies ==
Howard Husock, vice president for policy research at the conservative Manhattan Institute, heavily criticized Section 8 in a 2003 book on housing policy as a vehicle for exporting inner city social problems to the suburbs.

Hanna Rosin, an American journalist, has argued that Section 8 has led to crime being more evenly spread out across U.S. metropolitan areas, without any net decrease. This was the core thesis of her article published by The Atlantic in 2008, in which she linked Section 8 to a crime wave in the Memphis, Tennessee, metropolitan area. Rosin's article attempted to position Memphis as just one particularly troubling example of a nationwide trend: "Still, researchers around the country are seeing the same basic pattern: projects coming down in inner cities and crime pushing outward, in many cases destabilizing cities or their surrounding areas." Rosin's article has been highly influential among politicians in cities claiming to be negatively affected by Section 8, such as Lancaster, California.

Rosin's article was later criticized by Greg Anrig in an article published on The American Prospect. In the article, Anrig accuses Rosin of placing an excessive amount of blame on housing policy for the reported increase in crime. The article refers to the fact that Rosin never made a conclusive argument that those who participate in Section 8 were responsible for the higher rates of crime, as those who receive housing support are subject to screenings based on drug use and previous criminal activity. Rosin instead relies on a heat map of crime created by Richard Janikowski and Phyllis Betts who is reported to have said they were "[...] amazed – and deflated – to see how perfectly the two data sets fit together."

Janikowski and Betts later disavowed any connection between housing vouchers and increases in crime in the area in a later letter to the editor of The Atlantic. Rosin failed to mention that there was a consistent decrease and increase in crime from inner cities to inner-ring suburbs across most metropolitan areas due to shifting populations. Anrig argues that economic factors are more likely responsible for Memphis's increase in crime, as male unemployment almost doubled between the years of 1990 and 2000. Anrig also refers to Moving to Opportunity, a randomized policy experiment. The study concludes that there was no increase in violent crime for the participants of subsidized housing or their surrounding neighborhoods in the five cities tested; Memphis was not a part of the study. Even though the participants were far more likely to stay in poorer areas when given the chance to leave, families still received modest academic and psychological benefits. In fact, according to a paper prepared for the U.S. Department of Housing and Urban Development and the Office of Policy Development and Research, the causal direction is reversed: whether due to broader conditions which affect both trends, or a direct causation, increased crime rates precede housing vacancy, which in turn can lead to an increase in Section 8 vouchers for the region.

=== Housing specialists ===
Matthew Marr published a study of the Los Angeles housing market in the Summer of 2001 that examines the effects of housing placement specialists on the Section 8 voucher program. Marr finds that housing placement specialists function as an intermediary between tenants and landlords that help increase the mobility of Section 8 voucher recipients.

Tight rental markets can pose a challenge to Section 8 voucher recipients. Marr finds, through observations and interviews, that the resource of housing placement specialists can help prevent private landlord apprehension, and help voucher recipients navigate the program and general rental market. Landlord apprehension can be a result of many factors. Marr shows that it is rooted in racial stereotypes of tenants and slow government bureaucracy. Other qualitative data indicates some factors to be: tenant behavior and financial burden. These factors are some areas in which housing specialists work to mitigate problems.

== See also ==
- Affordable housing
- Discrimination in awarding Section 8 housing
- Eviction in the United States
- Title 24 of the Code of Federal Regulations
- Hills v. Gautreaux (1976) – a U.S. Supreme Court case upholding use of Section 8 vouchers to remedy housing discrimination in site selection.
- Public housing
- Subsidized housing
- Subsidized housing in the United States
- Housing estate
