= Coldharbour, Tower Hamlets =

Street and wider conservation area in Blackwall, London, England

Coldharbour
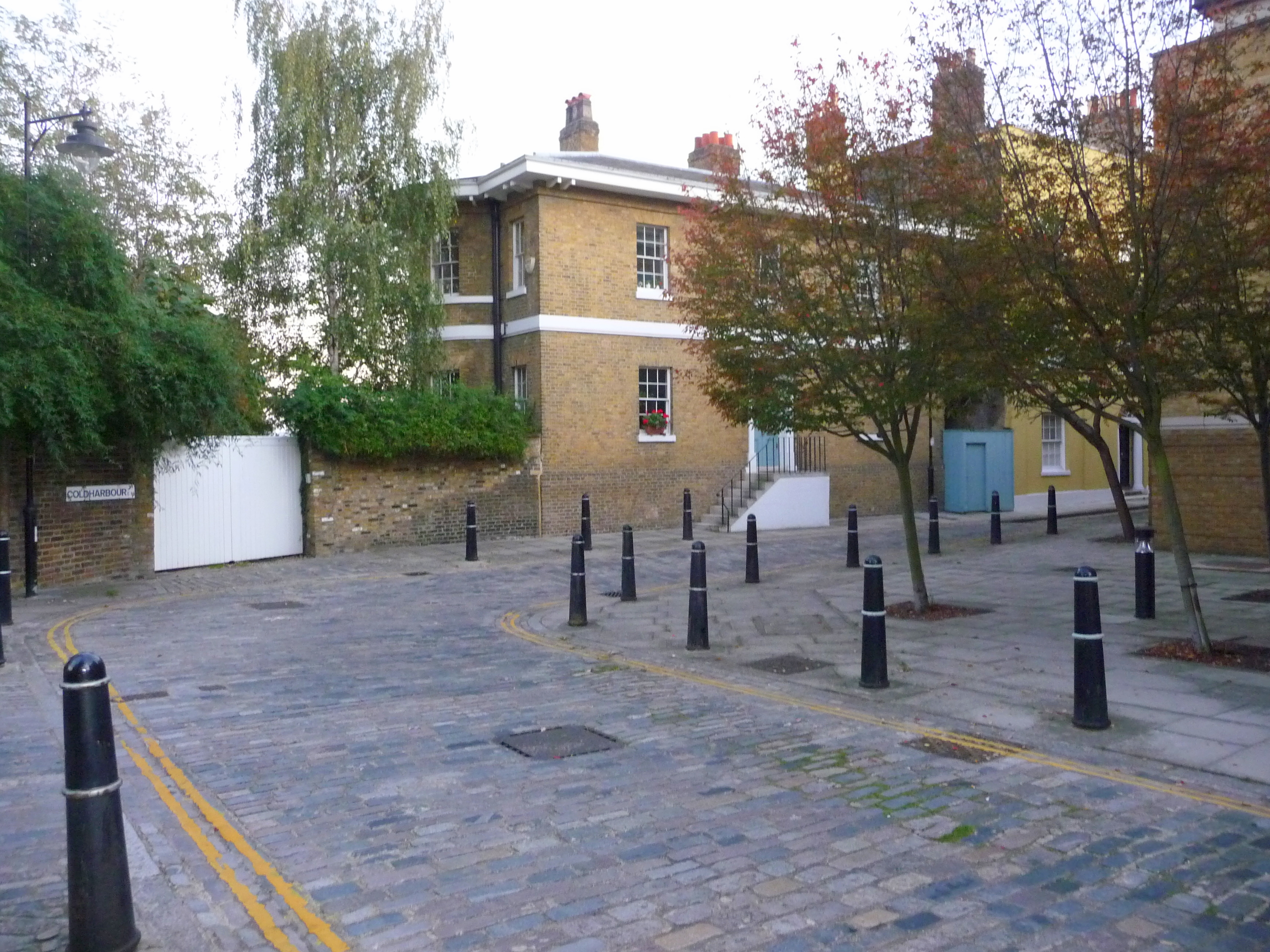
- Isle House at the northern end of Coldharbour
- Interactive map of Coldharbour
- Location: Tower Hamlets, London
- Postal code: E14
- Coordinates: 51.5028°N 0.0075°W TQ383908

Coldharbour is a street and wider conservation area in Blackwall, lying on the north bank of the River Thames, east of Canary Wharf. The area is said to be "[t]he sole remaining fragment of the old hamlet of Blackwall" and "one of the last examples of the narrow streets which once characterised the river's perimeter".

== History ==
=== Toponymy ===
The placename Coldharbour came in use from the early seventeenth century and its origins have been debated since the 1850s. Conflicting etymologies are given by authorities, with Ernest Weekley contending that "[t]his name is very frequently, and very unnecessarily, discussed. Its origin is quite well known, and it means what it appears to mean."

Those accepting the plainest derivation argue that a cold harbour was a "shelter of bare walls... used by travellers who carried their own bedding and provisions", often along a well-known route and similar to a modern bothy.

In alternative, a "coldharbour" could indicate ancient boundary marks in the form of artificial mounds of earth from Roman times, often filled with crockery or charcoal. The word could be derived either from the Latin collis arborum, meaning "hill with trees", or from the Anglo-Saxon col, meaning "coal" or "charcoal", har, "hoary" or "ancient", and bearth, a mound. The link with Roman roads has been contested on the basis that the proximity of Roman roads provides a statistically weak explanation and the fact that the name is not recorded before 1590.

It has also been suggested that most Coldharbour sites could have been named in a mocking manner after a dilapidated London aristocratic house. Other interpretations include "a place where goods were once... assembled for inland water transport or for portage."

=== Development ===
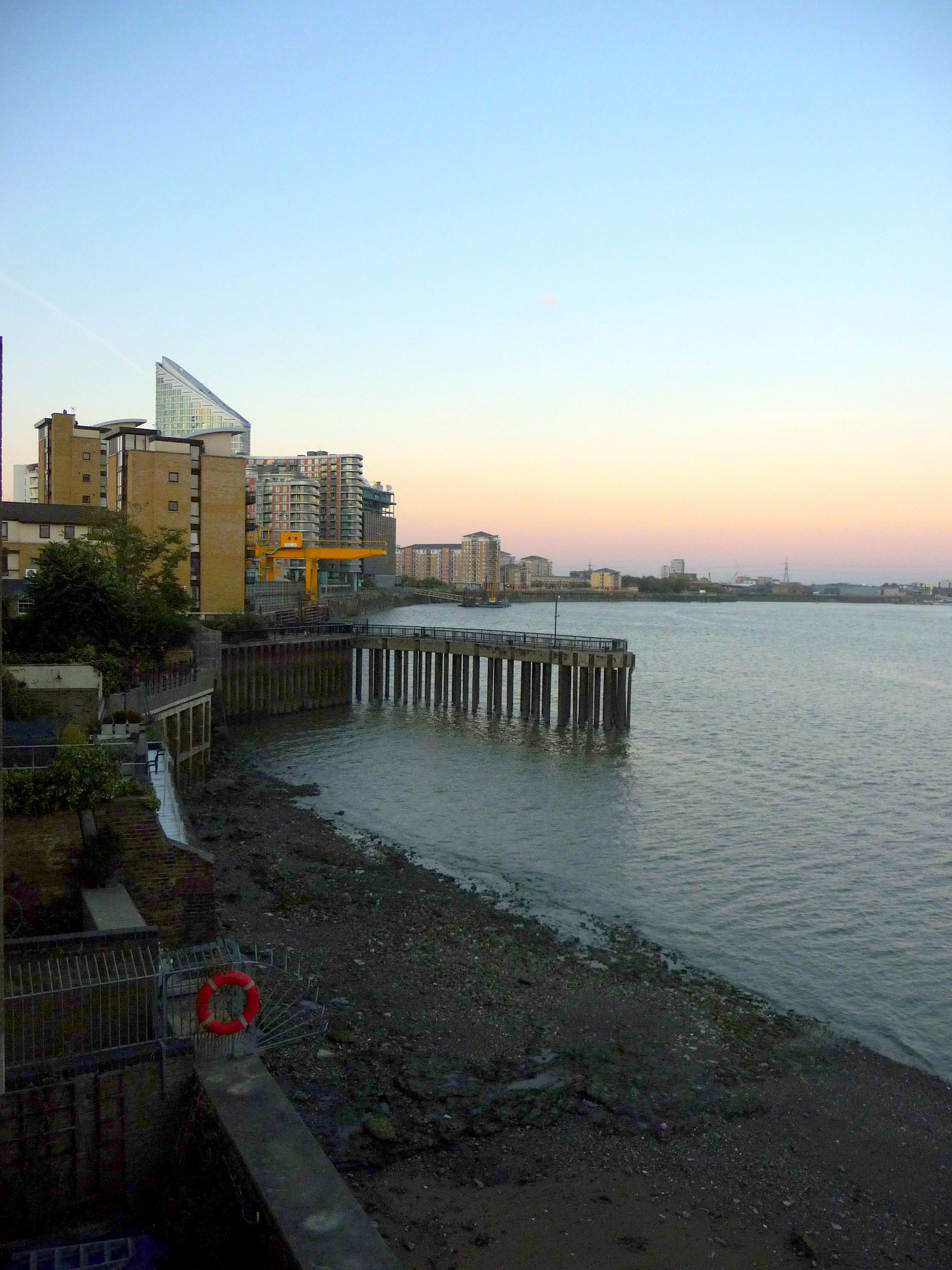
North Wharf, Coldharbour

Coldharbour was originally a path on the top of the late Mediaeval embankment of the Thames connecting Blackwall Stairs to "somewhere near the present entrance to the south dock of the West India Docks".

The first buildings on Coldharbour appeared by the second decade of the seventeenth century, probably as part of the activities spreading on the Thames riverfront after the opening of the East India Company's shipbuilding yard at Blackwall in 1614. A "ribbon of development" alongside the river at Coldharbour is marked on Joel Gascoyne's map of the Parish of St Dunstan's of 1703, comprising "dwelling houses, public houses, storehouses and warehouses ... interspersed with wharves, yards and even gardens."

John Betjeman describing Coldharbour as a place "where some fine Georgian merchants' houses have the water washing up to their walls". Although the oldest surviving buildings date back to the early nineteenth century, "many of the riverside sites retain an integrity which can be traced back to the seventeenth and eighteenth centuries."

The opening of the West India Docks (in 1802) and the City Canal (in 1805) cut off Coldharbour from the rest of the riverside road, with traffic being diverted to a newly built Bridge Road (later New Road, now Preston's Road) in 1817. Evidence of land reclamation, probably related to the digging of the docks and canals in the early nineteenth century, was identified by an archaeological survey. These changes gave Coldharbour its present layout as "a tiny loop road off Preston's Road," upon which architectural critic Ian Nairn remarked: "You will know a bit about East End topography by the time you find this one."

The area between Coldharbour and Preston's Road was progressively developed from the eighteenth century with dwellings around the northern end and mixed industrial premises, including shipwrights, joiners, mast- and blockmakers, ship's smiths, a rigging house, a cooperage, a boot-building yard, coppersmiths, wholesale ships' ironmongers and oil merchants.

=== Character of the area ===
An investigator compiling Booth's poverty maps noted the following about the Isle of Dogs and Coldharbour: "A great many more people work there than live there, though many of those who live there would like to work there. Those who live there seldom leave. From week to week and year to year the men who are islanders remain there."

=== Cold Harbour Infectious Diseases Receiving Station ===
In 1882 the Metropolitan Asylums Board (MAB) moved its smallpox hospital ships – the Atlas, the Endymion and the Castalia – to new moorings at Long Reach, an isolated stretch of the River Thames near Dartford, about 17 miles (27 km) from London Bridge. The removal of the ships to their new location required the provision of a River Ambulance Service to ferry patients from central London. The following year a pier was constructed at Long Reach for the reception of smallpox cases from wharves to be built at Rotherhithe, Poplar and Fulham.

This 1870s a Cattle Wharf was acquired by the MAB, just north of the Gun public house in Cold Harbour (until the MAB took it over in 1884 it was used by the General Steam Navigation Company for keeping imported cattle in quarantine), with the aim to build the new "North Wharf Receiving Station" for infectious diseases.

The East and West India Dock Company was dismayed at the prospect of highly contagious patients being brought to North Wharf along the narrow confines of Coldharbour, where several of the company's dockmasters lived. This potential source of conflict was averted when the MAB decided to make a new road between Coldharbour and New (now Preston’s) Road over their land on the west side of the street, and the dock company readily consented to give up the small strip required to make the opening into New Road. Laid out in 1884–5, the new road was called Managers Street, after the managers of the Metropolitan Asylums Board. At the wharf itself the MAB’s main requirement was a floating pier or pontoon, so that the transfer of patients could take place at all states of the tide. It was connected to the wharf by a gangway. Both these features were designed by the MAB’s own engineer, Adam Miller (also described as a naval architect), who had devised the ventilation system for the hospital ship Castalia. A galvanised-iron canopy was built in 1887 to protect patients, who were getting soaked through waiting for ambulances in the rain.

The Receiving Station had an examination room and an isolation ward for patients too sick to be transferred by river ambulance to Long Reach. Other land works were postponed while priority was given to building of the pier, which opened in 1885, just as the epidemic subsided. As the number of smallpox cases declined, the service was reorganised in 1913. The North Wharf was used only for smallpox patients, while the South Wharf at Rotherhithe dealt with general fever cases. By 1921 the North Wharf had 9 beds.

In 1930 the LCC took over administrative control from MAB. By this time the river service was rarely used, most patients being transferred by road. The service closed in May 1930 and, by 1933, the steamers had been sold.

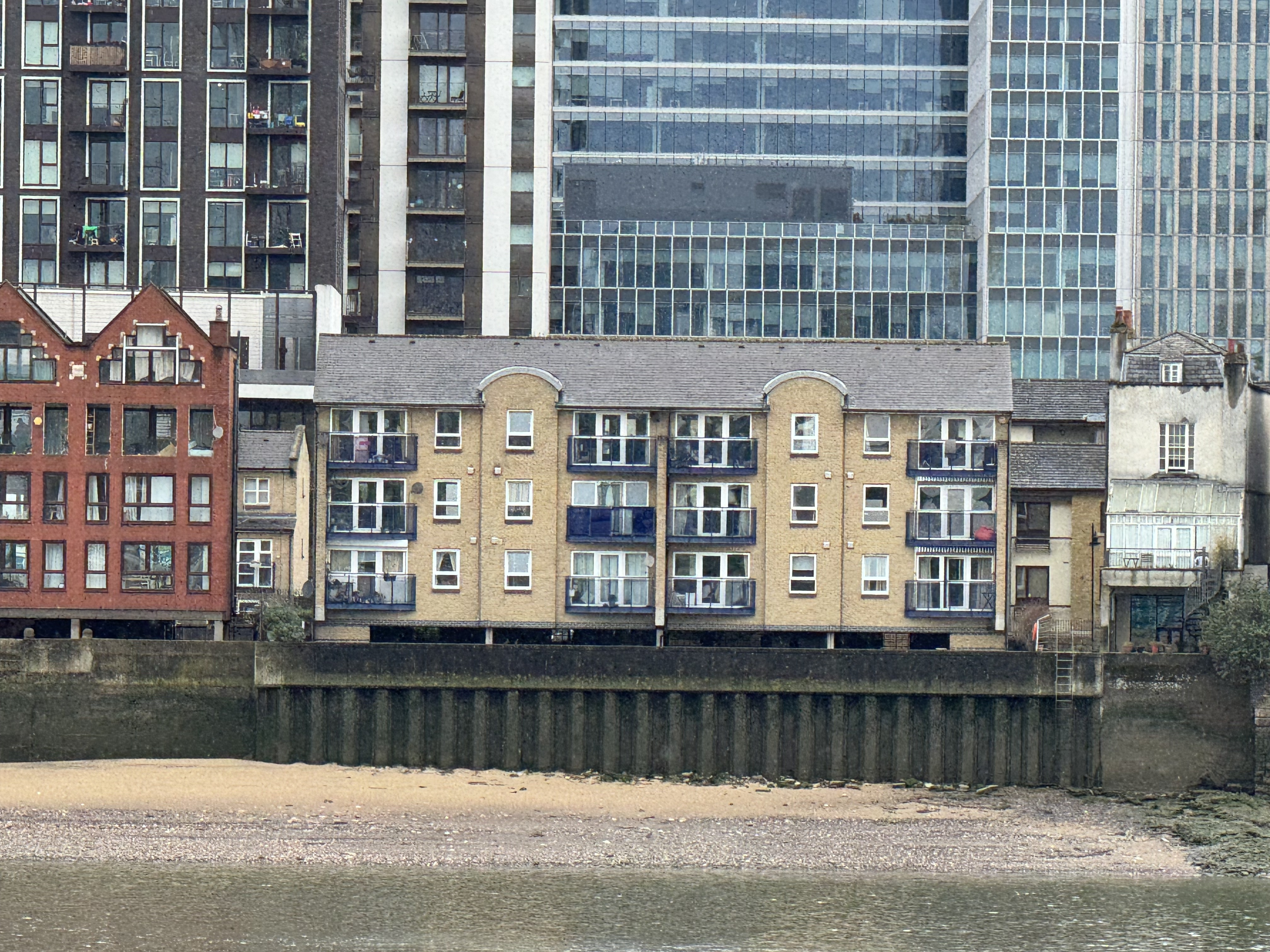
17 Coldharbour from the O2

By the 1980s, the pier and pontoon had been removed and the wharf was being used for storing wood. The buildings were demolished in 1992 and as part of the revival of the Docklands, in 1997 the land of 17 Coldharbour was redeveloped by the Bethnal Green and Victoria Park Housing Association with a £370,000 grant from the London Docklands Development Corporation's housing programme.

=== Famous local individuals ===
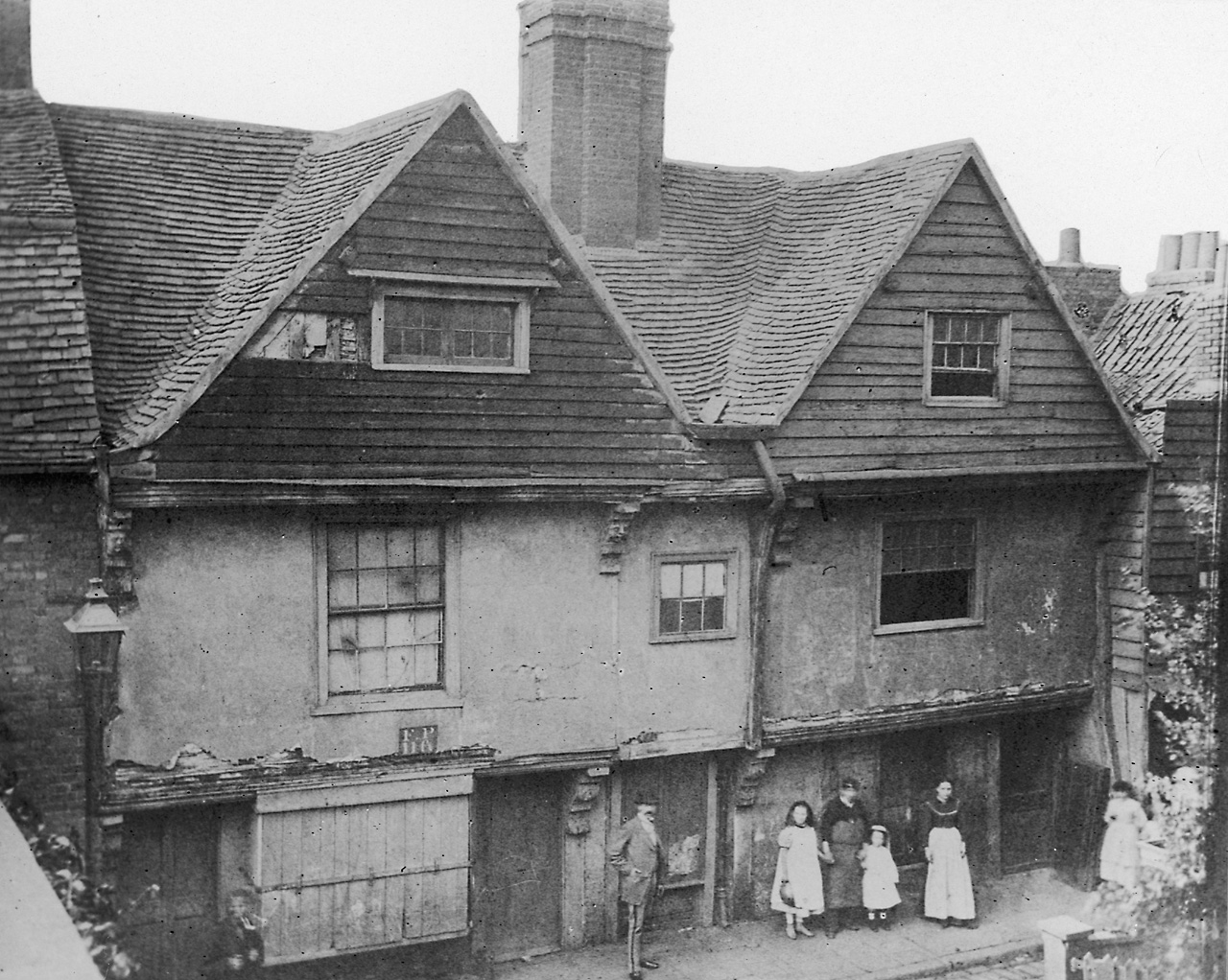
Raleigh's house at Blackwall, London, 1873.

- Charles Dickens is reported to have been a regular patron of the Fishing Smack, "one of the quaint old taverns by the river still standing in Coldharbour." He wrote about the area after visiting it in May 1853. The Fishing Smack public house stood at 9 Coldharbour and was demolished about 1948, though "a section of the brown glazed brickwork which was once part of the street front survives at the south corner of No. 7."
- Horatio Nelson's association with the area is preserved in the name of Horatio Place. Local tradition claims that Nelson stayed at Nelson House at no. 3 Coldharbour "during a fleet refit", though the connection is open to doubt given that the name was first associated with the building only in 1881. The Gun pub at No. 27 Coldharbour claims an upstairs room was used by Nelson to meet Emma, Lady Hamilton and the toilets are marked "Emma" and "Horatio".
- Walter Raleigh had a house in southern area of Blackwall, opposite the Artichoke Inn where Northumberland Wharf now stands. His exploration of Guyana in 1595 is commemorated by Raleana Road – Raleana being the name he gave to the territory.
- Thomas Spert, Controller of the Navy to Henry VIII and first Master of Trinity House, lived in a wooden manor house at 152 East India Dock Road at a time when the Coldharbour stretched farther towards Blackwall.

== Heritage ==
The industrial and maritime activities of Coldharbour's past are no more and today the area is largely residential. The Coldharbour conservation area, designated in 1975 and expanded in 2008, comprehends several historic buildings as well as engineering structures pertaining to the former docks.

=== Listed buildings ===
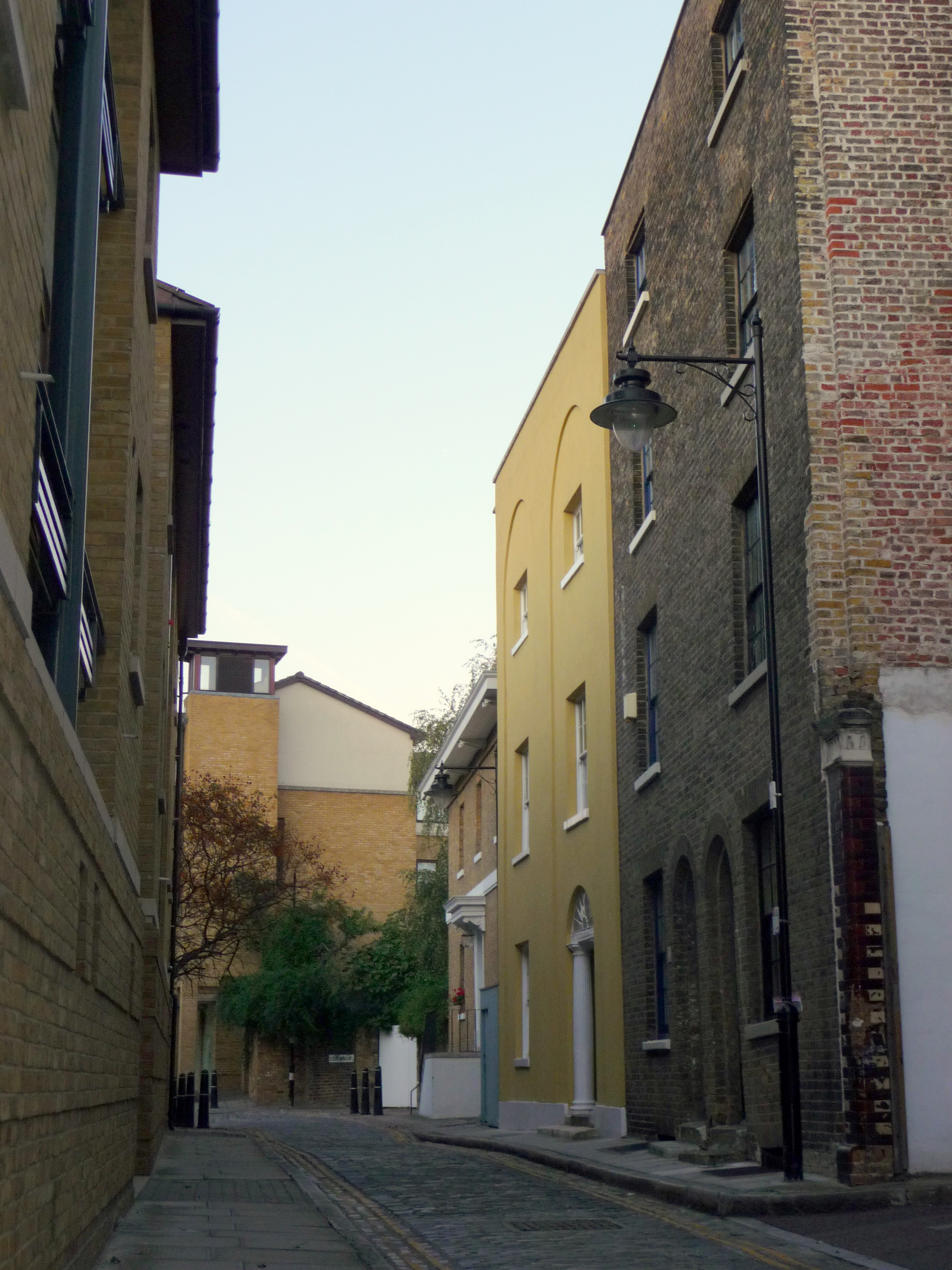
Coldharbour, looking north. The column of glazed bricks on the right marks the site of the Fishing Smack pub, linked to Charles Dickens.

The area is said to be "[t]he sole remaining fragment of the old hamlet of Blackwall" and "one of the last examples of the narrow streets which once characterised the river's perimeter". The modern surroundings, which include Canary Wharf and The O2 Arena, contribute to "making this surviving pocket all the more valuable and remarkable."

Several buildings in the conservation area, dating mostly to the late 18th and early 19th century, have listed status:

- Blackwall Basin (Grade I)
- 24 Prestons Road (Grade II)
- 1 Coldharbour (Grade II)

Isle House, at no. 1, was built in 1825–1826 by the West India Dock Company and used as a dock master's residence until the 1880s. Reputed to be "the finest house in Coldharbour," it was built with two storeys raised above a tall basement and full-height bow windows on the east and north fronts to give the occupants clear views of the Thames and the Blackwall entrance to the Docks.

- 3 Coldharbour (Grade II)
- 5 Coldharbour (Grade II)
- 7 Coldharbour (Grade II)
- 15 Coldharbour (Grade II)
- 19 Coldharbour (Grade II)
- The Gun Tavern Public House, 27 Coldharbour

Notable engineering structures include the northern entrance to the West India Basin and the entrance to the former City Canal, which cut across the peninsula and gave the "Isle" of Dogs its insular title. Public access to the street, entrance locks and to the perimeter of the Blackwall Basin and Graving Dock is maintained.

=== The riverside ===
An extension of the Thames Path runs along Coldharbour, where the river view is obstructed by a series of buildings. Public access to the riverside is possible at the former entrance to Blackwall Basin, now sealed, and by Lockeryard Pier, where the path rejoins the Thames waterfront at the height of Stewart St.

The architectural critic Ian Nairn noted that this "particular bit of the riverside is the sharpest part of the curve around Blackwall Point. Nowhere is the muddy horizontal excitement of the Thames more urgent than here, [...] the curvature making sure that the maximum amount of swift-running water stays in view."

== Geography ==
Coldharbour is situated in the London Borough of Tower Hamlets and is bounded by Landons Close to the north, by Marsh Wall to the south, by Preston Road and Wood Wharf to the west and by the river Thames to the east.

BBC World Service editor Andrew Whitehead described it as a "little enclave of riverine London ... spitting distance from Canary Wharf but sealed off from it by dock basins, new developments, and sturdy boundary walls."

== Transport ==
=== Docklands Light Railway ===
While there are no stations in Coldharbour, the nearest station is Blackwall DLR station in neighbouring Blackwall on the Docklands Light Railway in London fare zone 2 that opened on 28 March 1994.

=== London Buses ===
Current routes
| Route | Start | End | Served area since | Notes |
|---|---|---|---|---|
| D6 | Crossharbour ASDA | Ash Grove | 24.05.08 | |
| D7 | Mile End | All Saints | 18.09.1999 | |
| N550 | Canning Town | Trafalgar Square | 29.08.08 | |

Previous

- 56 (Mile End - Poplar Blackwall Tunnel) from 1942 to 1969, replaced by 277
- 106 (Finsbury Park - Crosshabour) from 1983 to 1989, replaced by D6.
- 277 (Smithfield - Poplar Baths) from 1959 to 1989, replaced by D7
- N50 (Trafalgar Square - Gallons Reach Retail Park) from 1995 to 2008, replaced by N550.

=== Roads ===
Coldharbour is connected to the National Road Network by the north-south Prestons Road A1206.

== Nearest places ==
- Canary Wharf
- Blackwall
- Poplar
- Cubitt Town
