= Hubert Llewellyn Smith =

English civil servant and social investigator

Portrait by Walter Stoneman, 1917

Sir Hubert Llewellyn Smith GCB (1864 – 19 September 1945) was a British civil servant. He served as permanent secretary to the Board of Trade from 1907 to 1919, where he played an important role in the Liberal government's welfare reforms. He also served as the chief economic advisor to the government from 1919 to 1927.

== Education and early career ==
He was born to Samuel Wyatt Smith, who was from Bristol. He was educated at Bristol Grammar School and Corpus Christi College, Oxford, where he graduated with a first class degree in Mathematical Moderations and Finals. He also won the Cobden Prize. He was briefly a lecturer in political economy to the Oxford University Extension and the Toynbee Trust before he became secretary to the National Association for the Promotion of Technical Education for four years. With Vaughan Nash, Smith co-authored a history of the 1889 London dock strike.

== Civil servant ==
He was appointed the Board of Trade's first Commissioner for Labour in 1893, where his work on statistics led to the Board of Trade Act 1909. Smith was also active in the improvement of industrial relations and in 1895 he helped to settle the strike in the shoe-making industry.

He was permanent secretary to the Board of Trade from 1907 to 1919. He worked with Winston Churchill, then President of the Board of Trade, and William Beveridge in the organisation of labour exchanges and unemployment insurance. He studied unemployment insurance in other countries, which led him to the conclusion that compulsory insurance through employers was superior to the voluntary system. His ideas were embodied in the National Insurance Act 1911, which introduced compulsory health insurance in certain industries.

As President of the Economic Section of the British Association for the Advancement of Science, he delivered in 1910 at Sheffield an address on "Economic Security and Unemployment Insurance". Here he explained how he had helped devise Britain's unemployment insurance system. The address was published in the Economic Journal and was considered by Beveridge to be "one of the most important ever given in that capacity". Smith invented judicial authorities to adjudicate benefit claims, which relieved Parliament of the burden: these were the Insurance Officers, Courts of Referees and the Umpire.

Shortly before the outbreak of the First World War in 1914, Smith succeeded in putting through his scheme of war risk insurance. In 1915 he became the general secretary of the Ministry of Munitions under David Lloyd George. In his memoirs Lloyd George wrote of Smith: "I considered him to be the most resourceful and suggestive mind in the whole of our Civil Service at that time—and withal a man whose long service at the Board of Trade had brought him intelligently into direct contact with every branch of commerce and industry throughout the world". Beveridge said that in this role Smith's "superhuman industry, his speed, and his resourcefulness in tackling new problems were demonstrated".

Smith was the chief economic advisor to the government from 1919 until he retired in 1927. He was a member of the economic committee of the League of Nations and deputy delegate to the League of Nations Assembly in Geneva for the years 1923 and 1924. He was also chairman of the British Institute of Industrial Art from 1920 until 1935 and chairman of the National Association of Boys' Clubs from 1935 to 1943. As the Director of the New Survey of London Life and Labour, Smith updated Charles Booth's Life and Labour of the People in London.

After Smith's death, William Beveridge paid tribute to him as "one of the most constructive practical minds that can ever have served the country". In his obituary of Smith in the Economic Journal, Beveridge wrote:

[He] was an outstanding public servant, in peace and in war... As a supremely constructive person, he was fortunate in reaching the most influential position in his career in 1907, just when a Government had come to power that wished to get new things done. The country was fortunate in having him there when the first of our total wars required so many new things to be done which fell in or near the sphere of his department... For constructive inventiveness in making new ideas in public administration viable, Llewellyn Smith can never have been surpassed, and can have had few equals.

== Personal life ==
Smith married Edith Weekley in 1901 and they had four sons and two daughters.

== Works ==
- Modern Changes in the Mobility of Labour, Especially between Trade and Trade: A Report to the Toynbee Trustees (London: Henry Frowde, 1901).
- 'Chapters in the History of London Waterside Labour', The Economic Journal, Vol. 2, No. 8 (December 1892), pp. 593–607.
- 'British Association for the Advancement of Science.—Sheffield, 1910. Extracts from Address to the Economic Science and Statistics Section', Journal of the Institute of Actuaries, Vol. 44, No. 4 (October 1910), pp. 511–518.
- 'Economic Security and Unemployment Insurance', Economic Journal, Vol. 20, No. 80 (December 1910), pp. 513–529.
- The Board of Trade (London: G. P. Putnam's Sons, 1928).
- 'The New Survey of London Life and Labour', Journal of the Royal Statistical Society, Vol. 92, No. 4 (1929), pp. 530–558.
- History of East London (London: Macmillan, 1939).
