= The Sociology of Spatial Inequality =

2007 book by Linda M. Lobao, Gregory Hooks and Ann R. Tickamyer

- Editors: Linda M. Lobao, Gregory Hooks, Ann R. Tickamyer
- Language: English
- Series: SUNY series in the Sociology of Work and Organizations
- Subject: Social inequality, human geography, spatial analysis
- Genre: Academic
- Publisher: State University of New York Press
- Publication date: May 2007
- Media type: Print (hardcover and paperback)
- Pages: 274
- Awards: Choice Outstanding Academic Title (2008)
- ISBN: 978-0-7914-7107-4 (hardcover); ISBN 978-0-7914-7108-1 (paperback)

The Sociology of Spatial Inequality is a 2007 edited volume by sociologists Linda M. Lobao, Gregory Hooks, and Ann R. Tickamyer, published by SUNY Press. The book argues that sociology's central question about the distribution of valued resources, "who gets what and why," has historically neglected the role of geographic space, and proposes a revised framing: "who gets what where." Based on contributions from sociologists and geographers, the volume addresses what the editors term the "missing middle" in inequality research: the subnational scale of regions, states, and places that falls between the well-studied levels of the city and the nation-state. The book grew out of a 2002 workshop at The Ohio State University, funded by the American Sociological Association and National Science Foundation through a Fund for the Advancement of the Discipline grant. The editors combine theoretical essays on the conceptualization of space, place, and scale with empirical studies on subjects including welfare reform, mortality, poverty, migration, and urban service distribution across the United States.

== Summary ==
The book is organized into three parts. The editors argue that sociology has long studied inequality and the spatial settings in which social life occurs, but that these two concerns developed through largely independent subfields, leaving the subnational scale underexamined.

The first part addresses conceptual and methodological issues. Linda Lobao and Gregory Hooks argue for the theoretical importance of the subnational scale. For Lobao and Hooks, the territory between nation and city reveals some of the country's most severe inequalities, especially those linked to governmental devolution. They outline a framework connecting subnational variations in poverty and prosperity to economic structure, institutional arrangements, and the historical forces embedded in place. Kevin Leicht and Craig Jenkins argue for integrating space into political sociology, which they see as underspatialized despite its reliance on territorial assumptions. Michael Irwin demonstrates that the choice of geographic units used in analysis affects observed levels of inequality and the statistical inferences drawn from them.

Ann Tickamyer, Julie Anne White, Barry Tadlock, and Debra Henderson use qualitative case studies from Ohio counties to investiagte how welfare reform and governmental devolution play out across Appalachian and non-Appalachian, rural and urban localities. They find that poorer, more remote counties lacked the institutional capacity to use new programming flexibility, meaning devolution reinforced rather than reduced existing spatial inequalities. Diane McLaughlin, C. Shannon Stokes, P. Johnelle Smith, and Atsuko Nonoyama trace determinants of mortality across U.S. counties, finding substantial spatial clustering of high and low mortality rates linked to local conditions such as social cohesion and health service availability. David Cotter, Joan Hermsen, and Reeve Vanneman find that metropolitan-area economic conditions affect family poverty risk beyond individual-level characteristics. Rogelio Saenz, Cynthia Cready, and Maria Cristina Morales examine Mexican American migration beyond the Southwest, constructing a typology of destination regions based on co-ethnic community presence. Deirdre Oakley and John Logan find that community service distribution across New York City neighborhoods does not follow the expected pattern of poor areas receiving fewer desirable services, attributing this in part to the city's permissive zoning history.

In the third part, geographers Vincent Del Casino and John Paul Jones respond from the perspective of their discipline. They place the volume within two traditions in human geography: spatial science and critical realism. Del Casino and Jones suggest that blending both approaches would strengthen inequality research, and that sociologists would benefit from deeper engagement with geographic theorizations of scale.

In the final chapter, the editors set out an agenda for future research, where they emphasize the need for stronger conceptual frameworks based on stratification theory, greater attention to spatial processes rather than static territories, and continued interdisciplinary dialogue with geography.

== Reception ==
In her review, Martina Löw praised the editors' conceptual introduction and its use of relational space theory drawn from Henri Lefebvre and Doreen Massey. She found the volume convincing in its demonstration that inequality research should account for spatial dimensions. Löw noticed, however, that most empirical contributions treated space statically as territory rather than as something produced through action, and that the volume "marks the beginning of a discussion rather than providing a summary," hence leaving unresolved how the processual qualities of space outlined in the theoretical chapters could be integrated into empirical inequality research.

For George Wilson, the project "shed light on the how spatiality can be related to stratification and inequality" and constituted "a further call for the analysis of spatial aspects of inequality in a dynamic fashion wherein space constitutes an object of study that is vitally and actively implicated in processes of inequality." Wilson noted that the breadth of substantive subjects covered was both a strength and a limitation, as several major literatures linking space and inequality (including work on social networks in economic sociology and residential segregation in race and ethnicity studies) received no mention.

Sarah Leonard found the variety of subjects and methods useful for demonstrating the broad-based potential of spatial inequality research, though she suggested that a greater variety of sample sizes beyond nationwide data would have been beneficial, especially for researchers focused on regional or community-level questions. Leonard described the book as a call to action for social scientists to incorporate space and place into the study of inequality.
