= Grenville Place =

Street in London

Coordinates: 51.4961°N 0.1850°W

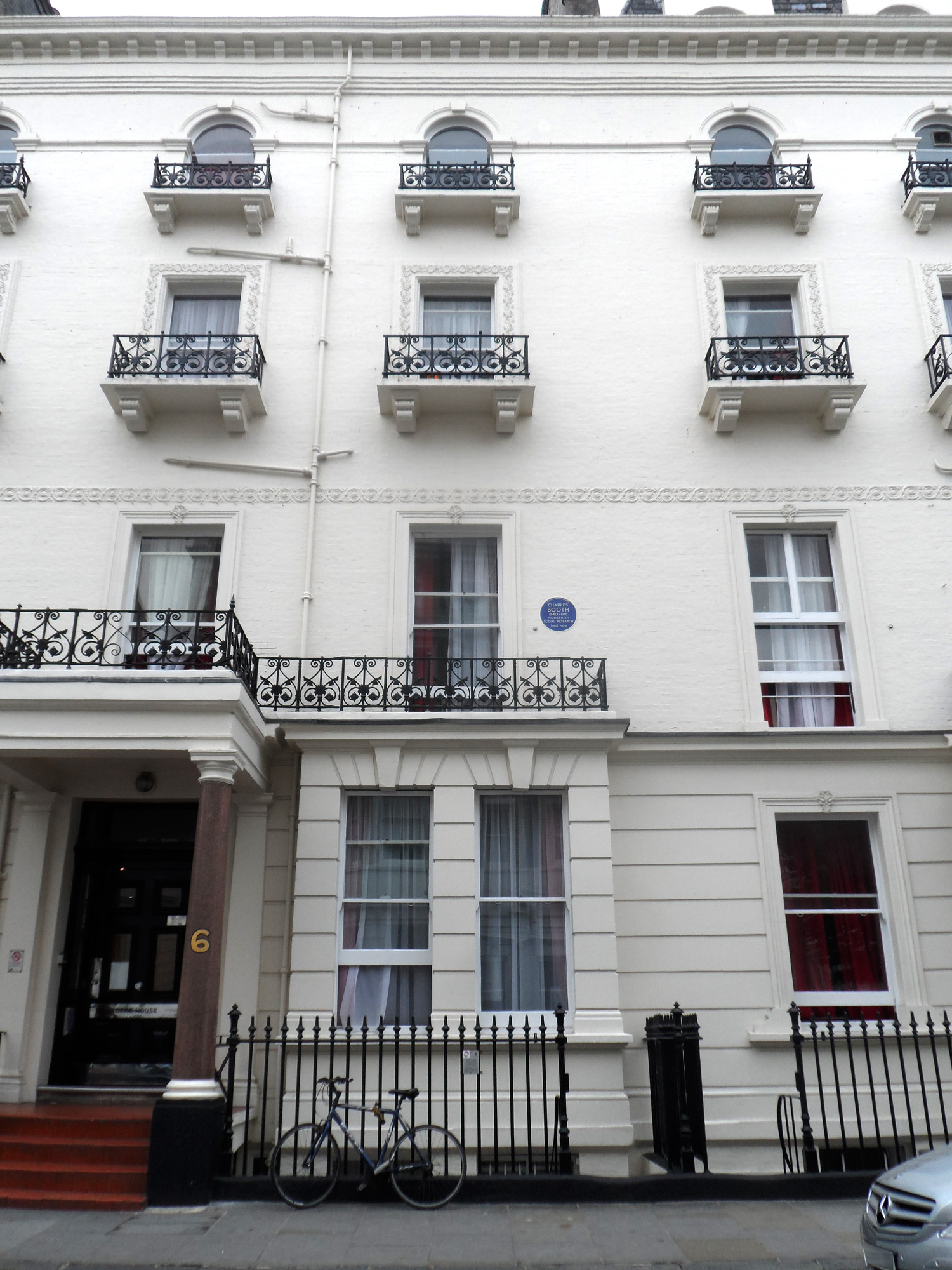
6 Grenville Place, the former home of Charles Booth.

Grenville Place is a street in the Royal Borough of Kensington and Chelsea, London, that connects Cornwall Gardens and Launceston Place in the north with Cromwell Road in the south. It is crossed in its northern part by Cornwall Mews South, and joined on its western side by Emperor's Gate (twice). it is joined on its eastern side by Southwell Gardens.

It forms part of the Holland Estate and is named after Dorothy Grenville who married Sir Walter Cope who built Holland House.

Notable former residents include the social reformer Charles Booth who lived in the street from 1875 to 1890.
