= Geography and wealth =

How location is linked to wealth

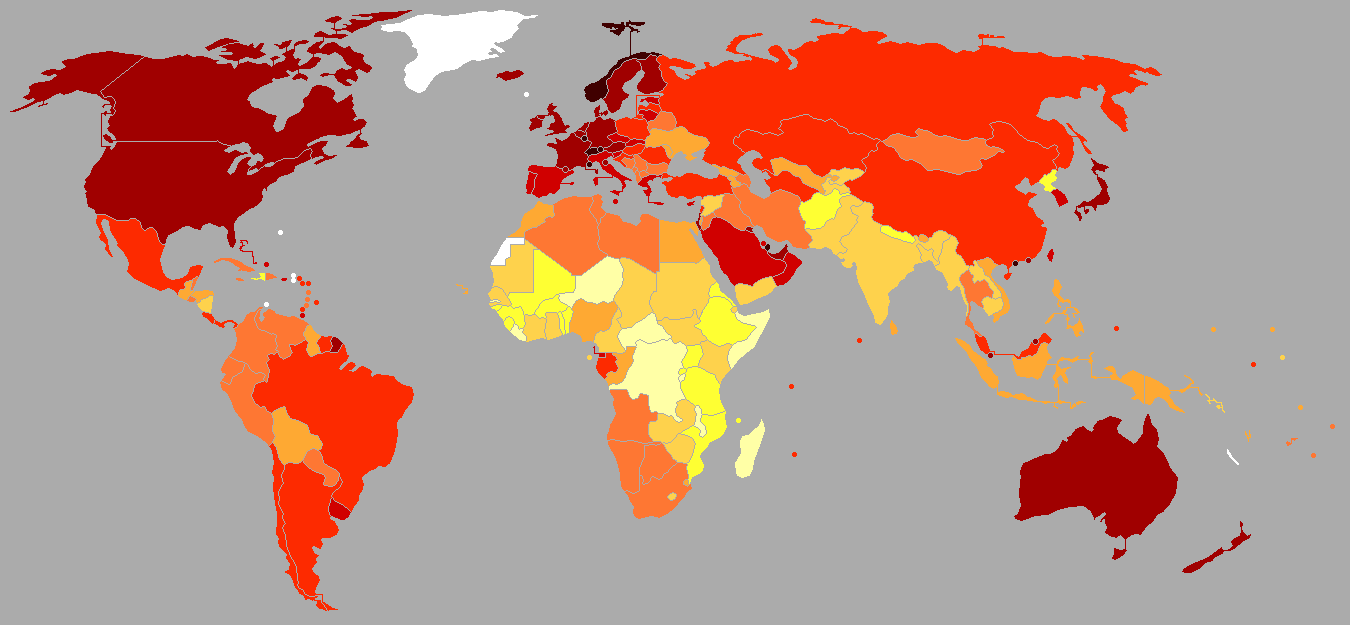
Gross domestic product (nominal per capita) in 2015 over $64,000 $32,000–64,000 $16,000–32,000 $8,000–16,000 $4,000–8,000 $2,000–4,000 $1,000–2,000 $500–1,000 below $500 unavailable

Geography and wealth are a frequent subject of study in geography, both between nations and across regions within nations. Some scholars, such as Jeffrey D. Sachs, argue that geography has a key role in the development of a nation's economic growth. For instance, nations that reside along coastal regions, or those who have access to a nearby water source, are more plentiful and able to trade with neighboring nations. In addition, countries with tropical climates face significant challenges, such as disease, extreme weather patterns, and lower agricultural productivity.

This thesis is supported by the fact that the volumes of UV radiation harm economic activity. Several studies confirm that spatial development in countries with higher levels of economic development differs from countries with lower levels of development. The correlation between geography and a nation's wealth can be observed by examining a country's GDP (gross national product) per capita, which takes into account a nation's economic output and population.

The wealthiest nations of the world with the highest standard of living tend to be those at the northern extreme of areas open to human habitation—including Northern Europe, the United States, and Canada. Within prosperous nations, wealth often increases with distance from the equator. Researchers at Harvard's Center for International Development found in 2001 that only two tropical economies — Singapore and Hong Kong — are classified as high- income by the World Bank, while all countries within regions zoned as temperate had either middle- or high-income economies.

== Measurement ==
Most of the recent studies use national gross domestic product per person, as measured by the World Bank and the International Monetary Fund, as the unit of comparison. Intra-national comparisons use their own data, and political divisions, such as states or provinces, delineate the study areas.

== Distance from the Equator ==
In prosperous nations, a greater distance from the equator correlates with higher wealth. For example, the Northeast United States has long been wealthier than its southern counterpart, and northern Italy wealthier than southern regions of the country. Even within Africa, this effect is evident, as the nations farthest from the equator are wealthier. In Africa, the wealthiest nations are the three on the southern tip of the continent, South Africa, Botswana, and Namibia, and the countries of North Africa. Similarly, in South America, Argentina, Southern Brazil, Chile, and Uruguay have long been the wealthiest. Within Asia, Indonesia, located on the equator, is among the poorest. Within Central Asia, Kazakhstan is wealthier than other former Soviet Republics which border it to the south, like Uzbekistan. Very often such differences in economic development are linked to the North-South issue. This approach assumes an empirical division of the world into rich northern countries and poor southern countries.

In addition, the problem of heterogeneous economic development (between the industrialised north and the agrarian south) also exists within the following countries:

- South and North Kazakhstan.
- Southern (Osh, Batken) and northern (Bishkek city and Chui) oblasts in Kyrgyzstan.
- Southern Italy and Padania.
- Flanders and Wallonia in Belgium.
- Catalonia, Basque Country and the rest of Spain.
- New England and the south-eastern states of the USA.
- Poland A and B.
- North (Mediterranean Coast) and South (Vast Saharan Region) in Algeria.

== Explanations ==
=== Historic interpretations ===
One of the first to describe and assess the phenomenon was the French philosopher Montesquieu, who asserted in the 18th century that "cold air constringes (sic) the extremities of the external fibres of the body; this increases their elasticity, and favours the return of the blood from the extreme parts to the heart. It contracts those very fibres; consequently, it also increases their force. On the contrary, warm air relaxes and lengthens the extremes of the fibres; of course, it diminishes their force and elasticity. People are therefore more vigorous in cold climates."

The 19th-century historian Henry Thomas Buckle wrote that "climate, soil, food, and the aspects of nature are the primary causes of intellectual progress—the first three indirectly, through determining the accumulation and distribution of wealth, and the last by directly influencing the accumulation and distribution of thought, the imagination being stimulated and the understanding subdued when the phenomena of the external world are sublime and terrible, the understanding being emboldened and the imagination curbed when they are small and feeble."

The first industrial revolution marked the beginning of divergence among nations. Alex Trew introduces a spatial take-off model that uses data on occupations in 18th-century England. The model predicts changes in the spatial distribution of agricultural and manufacturing employment, which are consistent with the 1817 and 1861 data. Thus, one of the historical factors influencing the geographical unevenness of wealth distribution is the degree of industrial development, catalysed by the Industrial Revolution.

=== Climatic differences ===
Physiologist Jared Diamond was inspired to write his Pulitzer Prize-winning work Guns, Germs, and Steel by a question posed by Yali, a New Guinean politician: why were Europeans so much wealthier than his people? In this book, Diamond argues that the Europe-Asia (Eurasia) land mass is particularly favorable for the transition of societies from hunter-gatherer to farming communities. This continent stretches much farther along the same lines of latitude than any other continent. Since it is much easier to transfer a domesticated species along the same latitude than it is to move it to a warmer or colder climate, any species developed at a particular latitude will be transferred across the continent in a relatively short amount of time. Thus, the inhabitants of the Eurasian continent have had a built-in advantage in terms of earlier development of farming, and a greater range of plants and animals from which to choose. Oded Galor, and Ömer Özak examine existing differences in time preference across countries and regions, using pre-industrial agro-climatic characteristics. The authors conclude that agro-climatic characteristics have a significant impact through culture on economic behaviour, the degree of technology adoption and human capital.

==== Impact of global warming ====
In a 2006 paper discussing the potential impact of global warming on wealth, John K. Horowitz of the University of Maryland predicted that a 2-degree Fahrenheit (1 °C) temperature increase across all countries would cause a decrease of 2 to 6 percent in world GDP, with a best estimate of around 3.5 percent. The former United Nations Secretary-General Ban Ki-moon had expressed concern that global warming would exacerbate the existing poverty in Africa. There is growing evidence that the inequality between rich and poor people's emissions within countries now exceeds the inequality between countries. High-emitting countries have more in common across international borders, regardless of where they live. It is noted that personal wealth explains more than national wealth the sources of emissions.

=== Cultural differences ===
One important determinant of unequal wealth in spatial contexts is significant cultural differences, including issues of attitudes to women and the slave trade. Existing research finds that the descendants of societies that traditionally practised plough farming now have less equal gender norms. The evidence is strong and persistent across countries, areas within countries, and ethnic groups within areas. This research is particularly relevant in terms of the division of labour and equality as a basic mechanism that contributes to economic development. Part of the work is devoted to analyzing the slave trade as a cultural element of spatial development. Nathan Nunn, and Leonard Wantchekon explore the differences in levels of donorisation in Africa. The authors find that people whose ancestors were heavily raided during the slave trade are less trusting today. The authors used several strategies to determine trust and found that the link is causal. Furthermore, it is noted that the rugged terrain in Africa protected those who were raided during the slave trade. Given that the slave trade inhibited subsequent economic development, the rugged terrain in Africa has also had a historically indirect positive effect on income. Another factor determining spatial development is the distance to pre-industrial technological frontiers. It has been noted that it can contribute to the emergence of a culture conducive to innovation, knowledge creation and entrepreneurship.

=== Unequal technology development ===
Diamond notes that modern technologies and institutions were designed primarily in a small area of northwestern Europe, which is also supported by Galor's book "The journey of humanity: the origins of wealth and inequality". After the Scientific Revolution in Europe in the 16th century, the quality of life increased and wealth began to spread to the middle class. This included agricultural techniques, machines, and medicines. These technologies and models readily spread to areas colonized by Europe, which happened to have similar climates, such as North America and Australia. As these areas also became centres of innovation, this bias was further enhanced. Technologies ranging from automobiles to power lines are more often designed for colder, drier regions, since most of their customers are from these regions.

The book Guns, Germs, and Steel goes on to document a feedback effect whereby technologies designed for the wealthy make them wealthier and thus more able to fund technological development. He notes that the far north has not always been the wealthiest latitude; until only a few centuries ago, the wealthiest belt stretched from Southern Europe through the Middle East, northern India and southern China, which was also highlighted in the book of Mokyr "The lever of riches: Technological creativity and economic progress". A dramatic shift in technologies, beginning with ocean-going ships and culminating in the Industrial Revolution, saw the most developed belt move north into northern Europe, China, and the Americas. Northern Russia became a superpower, while southern India became impoverished and colonized. Diamond argues that such dramatic changes demonstrate that the current distribution of wealth is not only due to immutable factors such as climate or race, citing the early emergence of agriculture in ancient Mesopotamia as evidence.

Diamond also notes the feedback effect on the growth of medical technology, stating that more research funding goes toward curing the ailments of Northerners.

=== Disease ===
Ticks, mosquitos, and rats, which continue to be important disease vectors, benefit from warmer temperatures and higher humidities. There has long been a malarial belt spanning the equatorial portions of the globe; the disease is especially deadly to children under the age of five. Notably, it has been almost impossible for most forms of northern livestock to thrive due to the endemic presence of the tsetse fly. Bleakley finds empirical evidence that ankylostomosis eradication in the American South contributed to a significant increase in income that coincided with eradication activities.

Jared Diamond has linked the domestication of animals in Europe and Asia to the emergence of diseases that enabled these regions to conquer inhabitants of other continents. The close association of people in Eurasia with their domesticated animals provided a vector for the rapid transmission of diseases. Inhabitants of lands with few domesticated species were never exposed to the same range of diseases. So, at least on the American continents, they succumbed to diseases introduced from Eurasia. These effects were exhaustively discussed in William McNeill's book Plagues and Peoples. Besides, Ola Olsson, and Douglas A. Hibbs argue that geographical and initial biogeographical conditions had a decisive influence on the location and timing of the transition to sedentary agriculture, complex social organisation and, ultimately, to modern industrial production.

The 2001 Harvard study mentions high infant mortality as another factor; since birth rates usually increase in compensation, women may delay their entry into the workforce to care for their younger children. The education of the surviving children then becomes difficult, perpetuating a cycle of poverty. Bloom, Canning, and Fink argue that health in childhood affects productivity in adulthood.

=== Landlockedness ===
Countries without direct access to the sea—commonly referred to as landlocked countries—face persistent structural challenges that hinder their economic development. Research shows that landlocked developing countries (LLDCs) typically experience slower economic growth, export less, and have lower per capita income compared to coastal nations. This is due to higher transportation costs, dependence on neighboring transit countries, and exposure to political instability and administrative inefficiencies across borders.

Additionally, landlocked countries are frequently cut off from economic sectors such as international tourism, maritime trade, and coastal resource industries. These disadvantages contribute to a substantial growth penalty: a cross-country analysis found that landlocked countries grew on average 1.5 percentage points more slowly per year than similar coastal countries, even after accounting for differences in investment levels and income.

=== Other ===
- In "Climate and Scale in Economic Growth", William A. Masters and Margaret S. McMillan of Purdue University and Tufts University hypothesize that the disparity is partially due to the effects of frost in increasing soil fertility.
- Hernando Zuleta, of the Universidad del Rosario, has proposed that where output fluctuations are more profound, i.e., areas that experience winter, saving is more pronounced, which leads to the adoption or creation of capital-intensive technologies.
- Daron Acemoglu, Simon Johnson, and James A. Robinson of MIT argued in 2001 that in places where Europeans faced high mortality rates, they could not settle and were more likely to set up exploitative institutions. These institutions offered no protection for private property or checks and balances against government expropriation. They assert that after controlling for the effect of institutions, countries in Africa or those closer to the equator do not have lower incomes. This work has been disputed by David Albouy, who argues that European mortality rates in the study were badly mismeasured, falsely supporting its conclusion.
- The authors of "Brain size, cranial morphology, climate, and time machines" assert that colder climates increase brain size, resulting in an intelligence differential.
- Dao, N.T., and Davila, J. argue that when several geographical factors coincide, the economy may become locked in Malthusian stagnation and never develop.

== See also ==
- North-South divide
- International inequality
- Land (economics)
- List of countries by GDP (nominal)
- Development geography
- Measures of national income and output
- Tropical disease
- Poverty map
