= The Gun, Coldharbour =

Pub in Coldharbour, London

The Gun
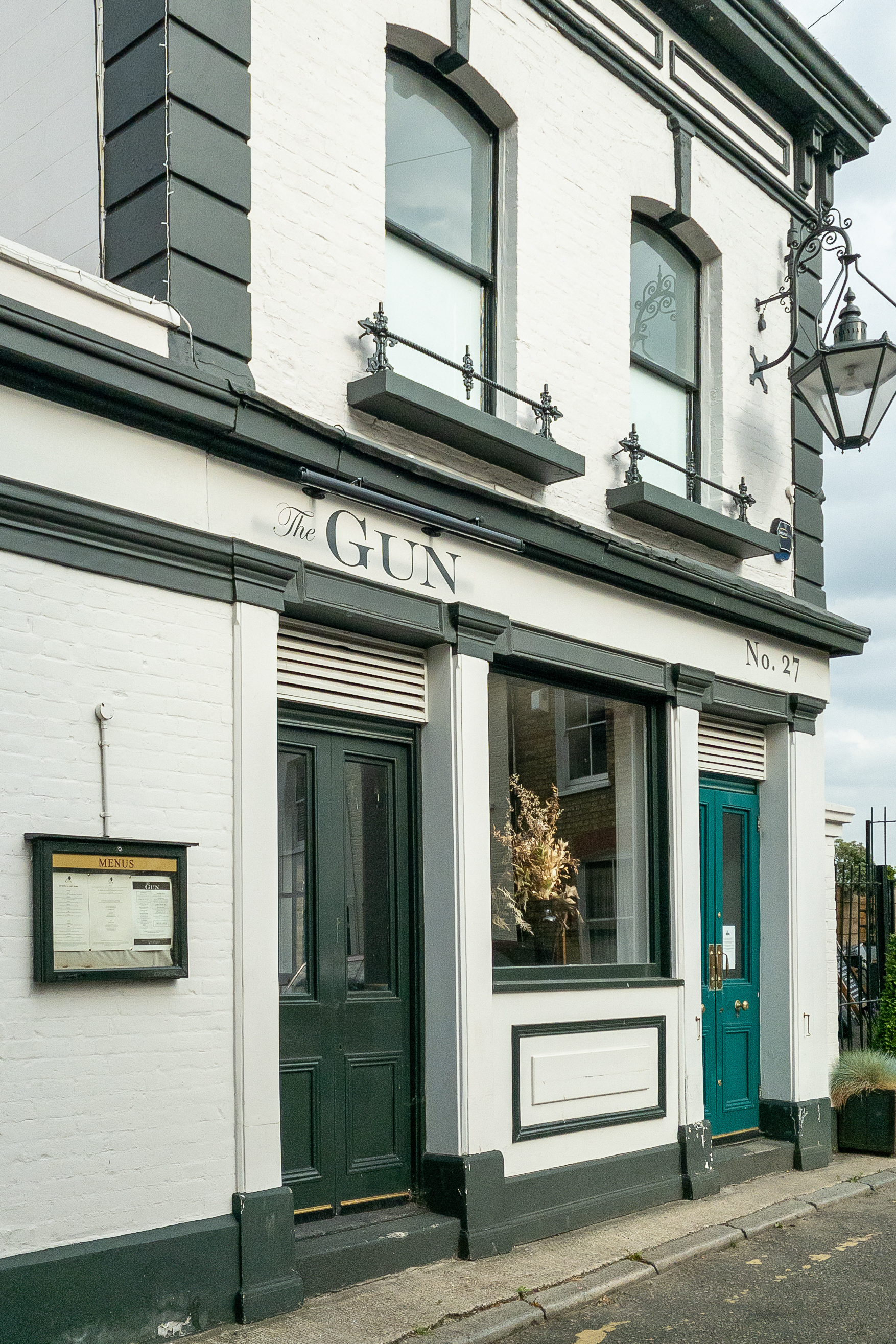
- View of the pub on 27 Coldharbour

- Location within London Borough of Tower Hamlets Location within Greater London
- Former names: The King and Queen (1722), The Rose and Crown (1725), Ramsgate Pink (1745)
- Etymology: Cannon fired when the West India Docks opened in 1802

General information
- Type: Public house
- Location: 27 Coldharbour, Coldharbour, London, England
- Coordinates: 51°30′06″N 0°00′28″W
- Opened: 18th century

Design and construction
- Designations

Listed Building – Grade II
- Official name: The Gun Public House
- Designated: 27 September 1973
- Reference no.: 1357804

Website
- www.thegundocklands.com

The Gun is a Grade II listed public house at 27 Coldharbour, Coldharbour, London. It takes its name from the cannon which was fired when the West India Docks first opened in 1802.

== History ==
The pub has occupied the plot of 27 Coldharbour since the early 18th century under various trading names. It was first called The King and Queen in 1722 before being renamed to The Rose and Crown in 1725 and later Ramsgate Pink in 1745. It took on its current name, The Gun, in 1771.

Lord Horatio Nelson is commonly associated with The Gun having lived locally and where it is said that he visited the docks to inspect the guns. In addition, he would frequent the pub to secretly meet Lady Emma Hamilton in an upstairs room (now called The River Room) for their affair.

There is also a long association with smugglers landing contraband on the site and distributing it via a hidden tunnel. To this day there is still a spy-hole in the secret circular staircase to watch out for “The Revenue Men”.

== Modern Usage ==
The Gun is now a Grade II listed building which was restored after a fire in 2001 which kept the pub closed for 3 years. Previously The Gun was owned by the ETM group who sold the pub to Fuller, Smith & Turner in July 2016. The pub is now operated as a gastro-pub including an outdoor Gin Garden which has previously been sponsored by Sipsmith, a covered riverside terrace and rooms that have been converted for private hire. The Gun is now largely focused on food serving modern British cuisine but also serving Fuller's beers and high quality wines.

As the pub is located in the Docklands area of London the pub caters to the many workers of Canary Wharf but also the residents of the Isle of Dogs.

== Notable patrons ==
- Lord Nelson
- Alan Brazil
- Ray Parlour
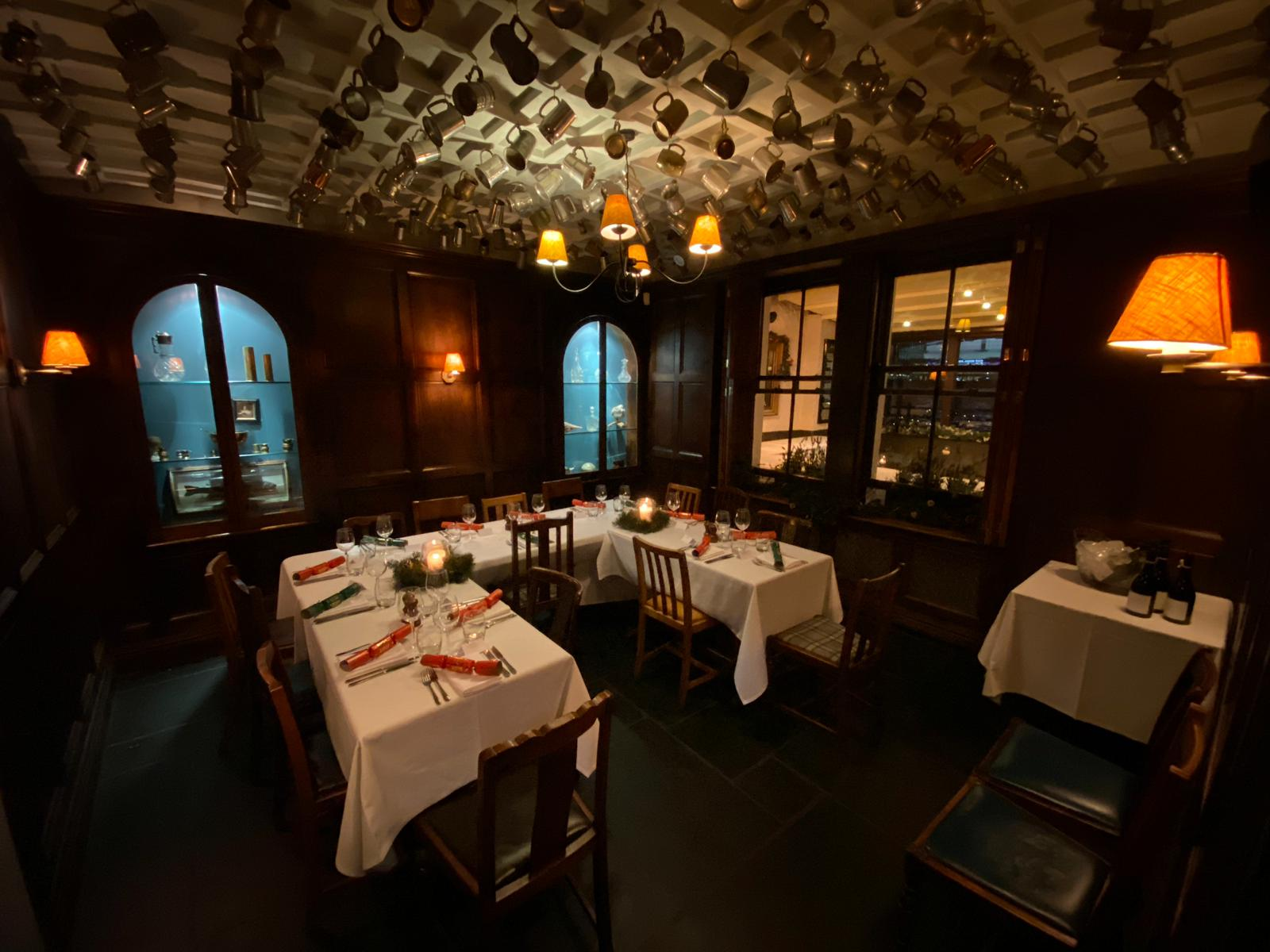
Cabin Room with Hanging Tankards

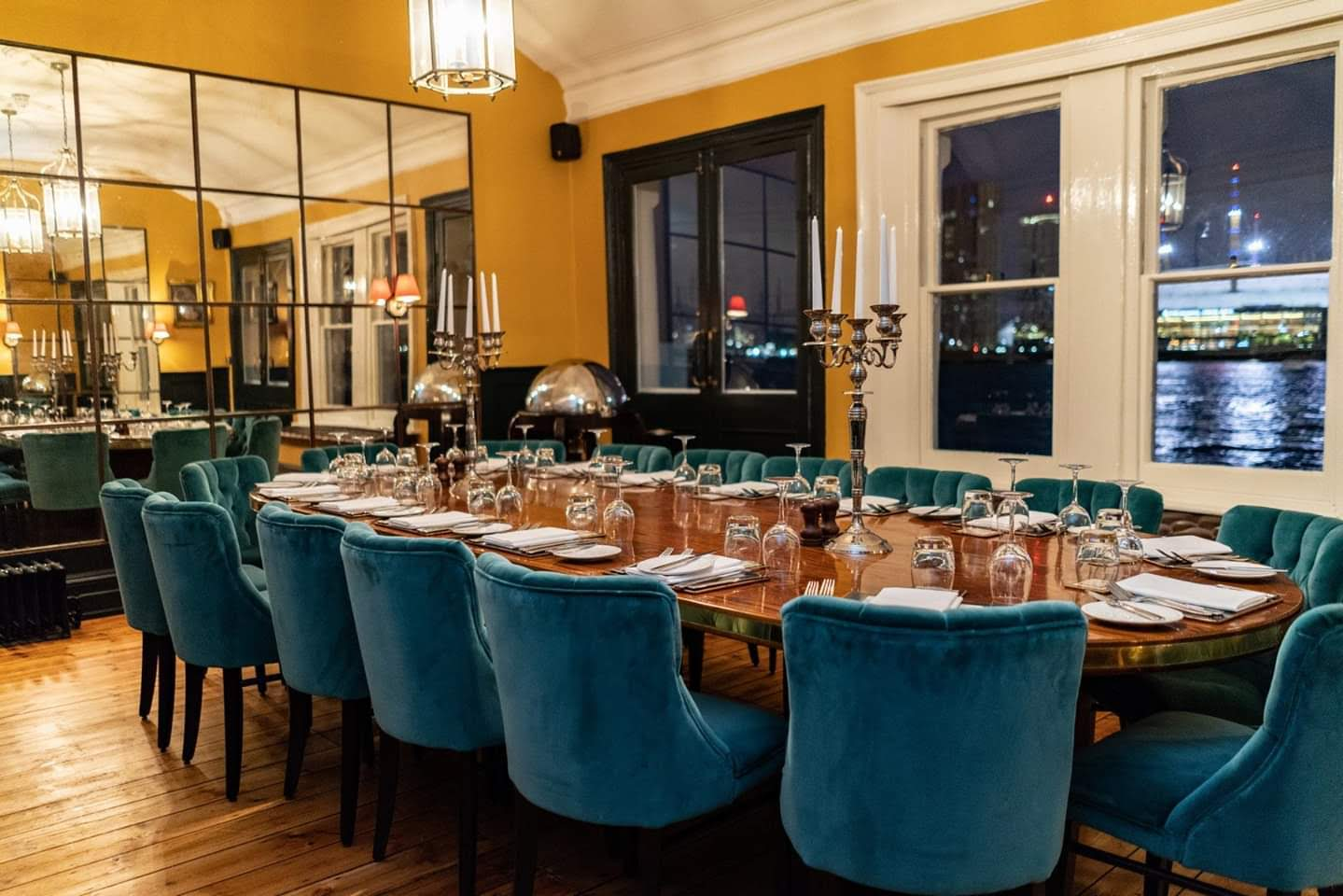
The upstairs River Room

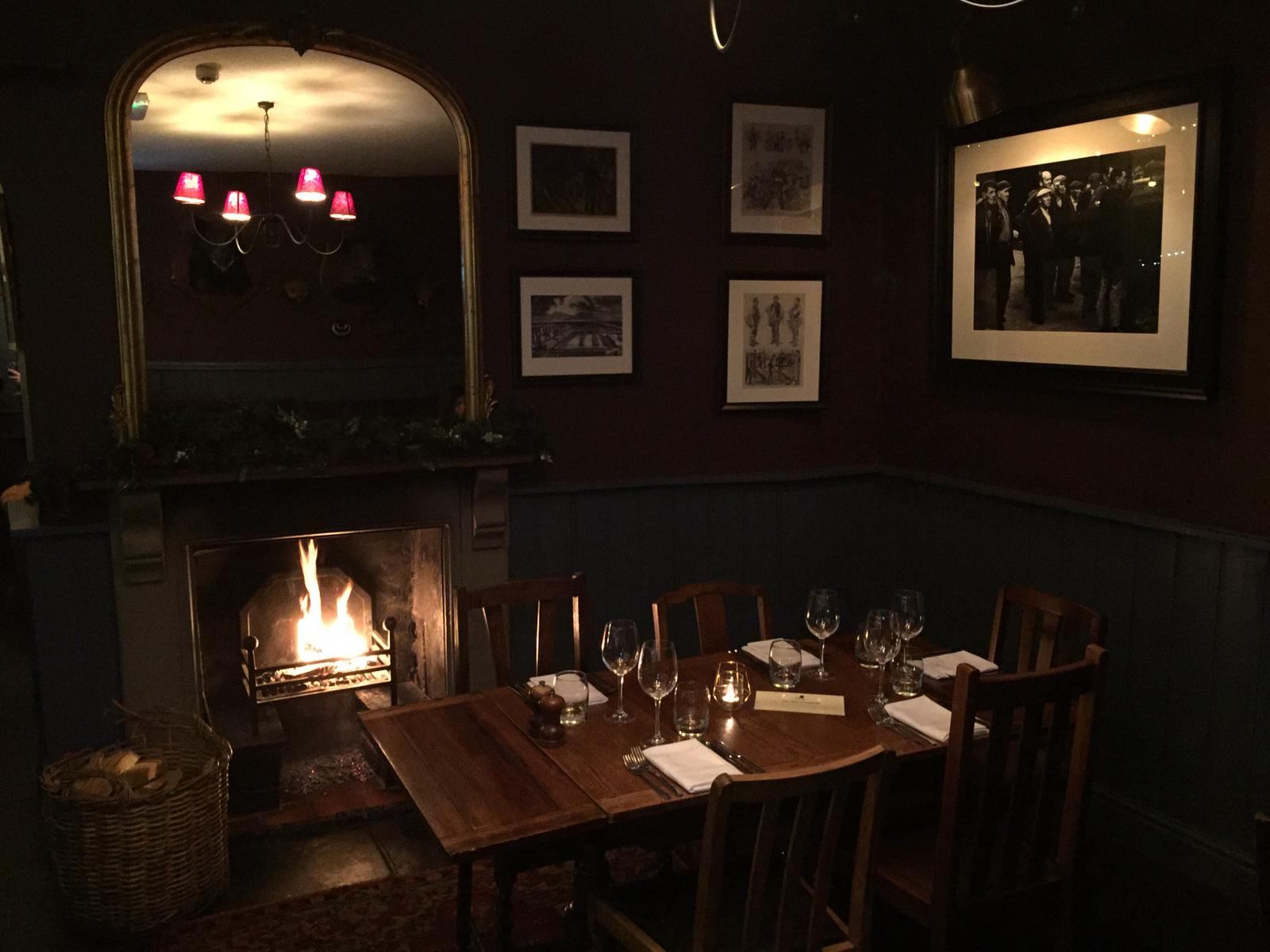
Open fire in the Red Room

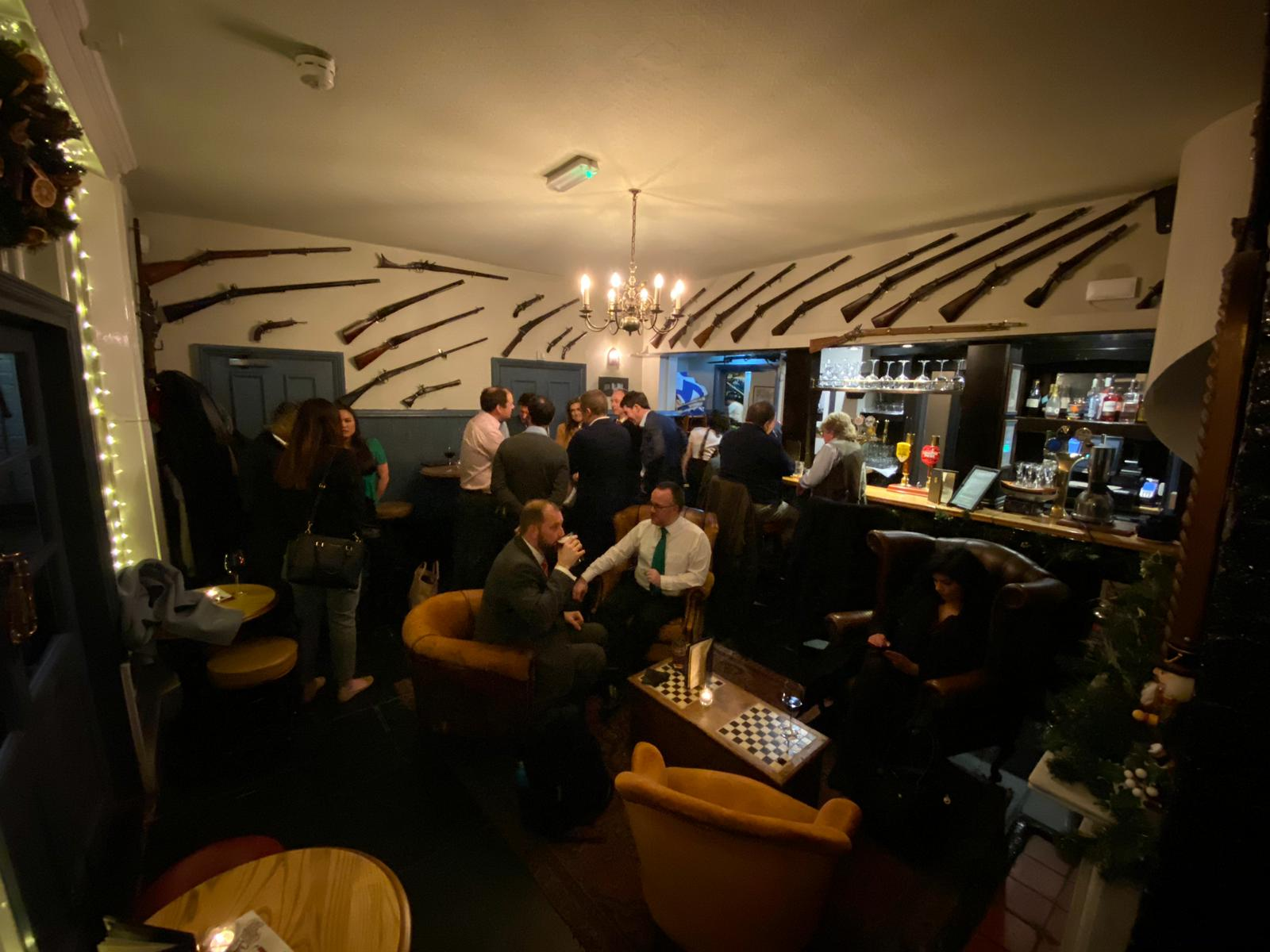
Gun Room

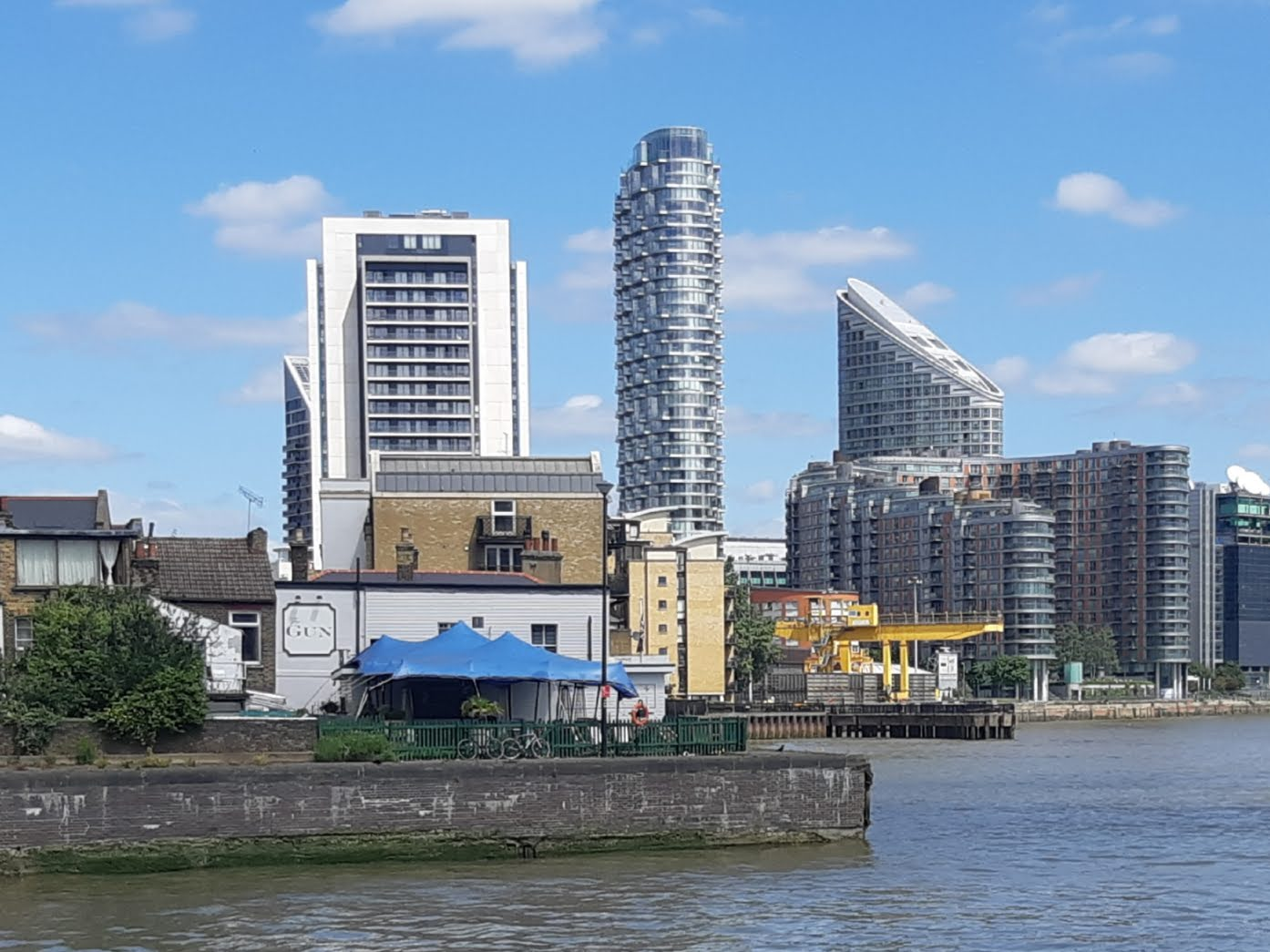
Location of The Gun at the West India Docks

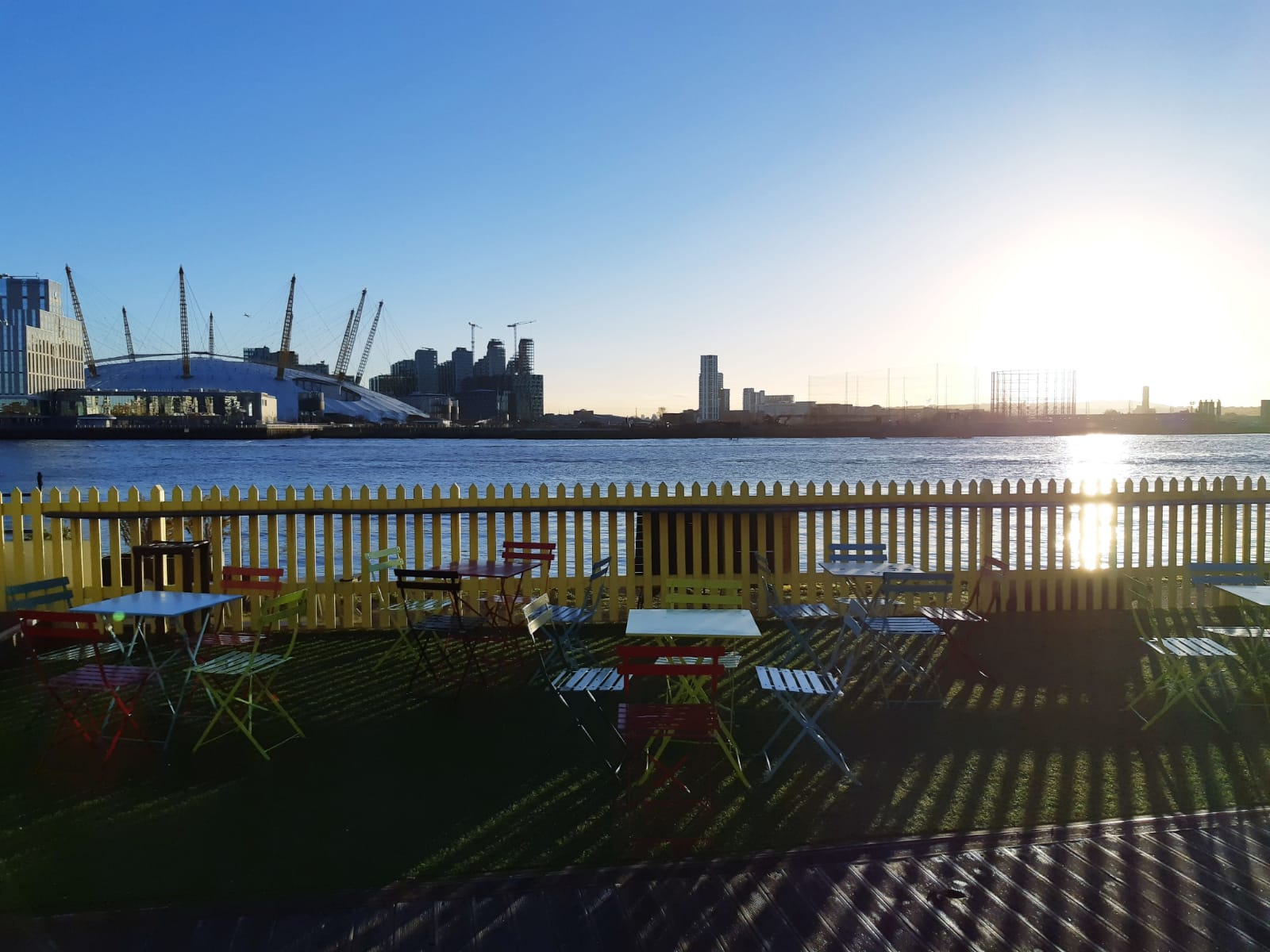
Gin Garden at The Gun

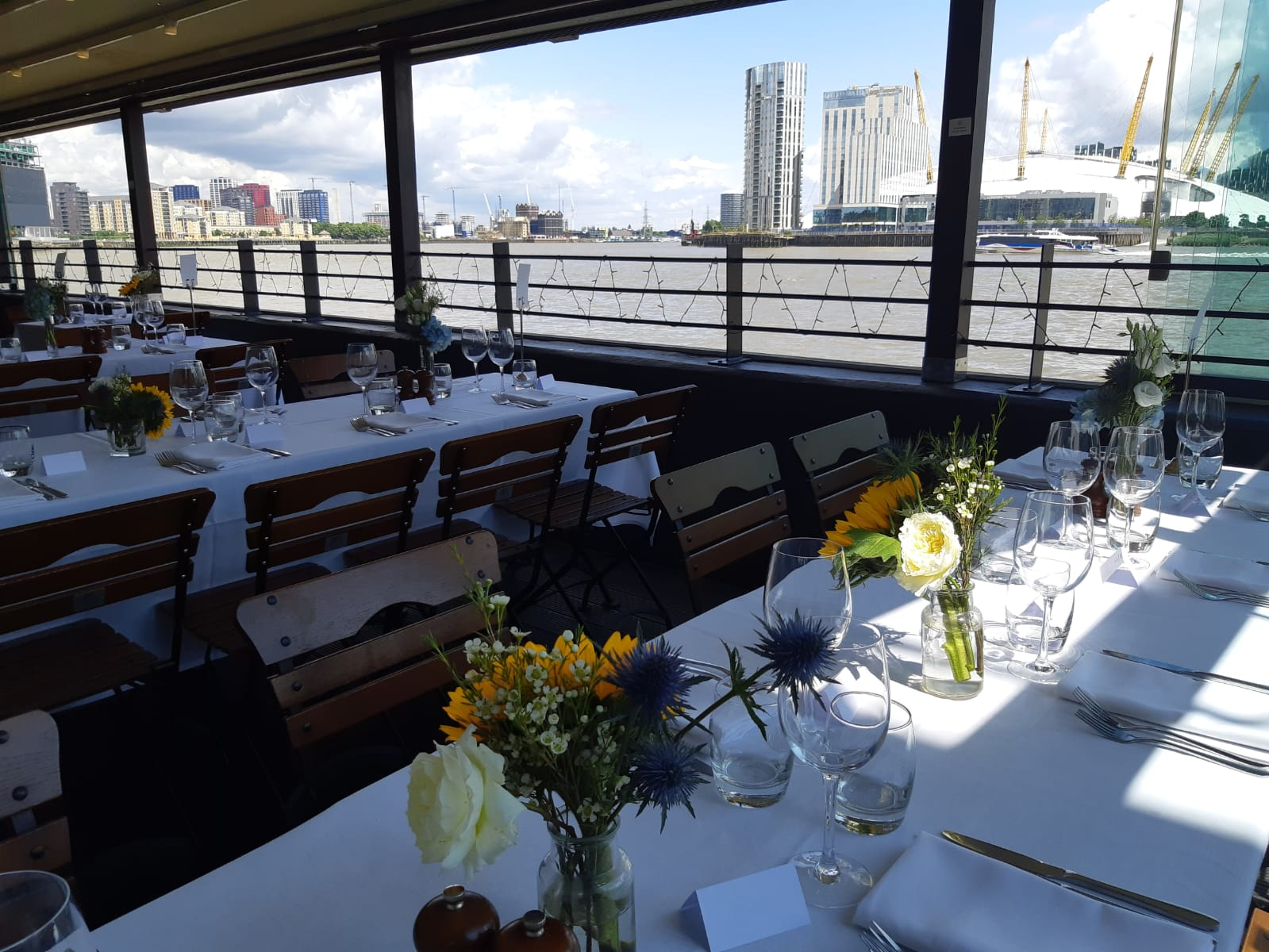
Riverside Terrace at The Gun

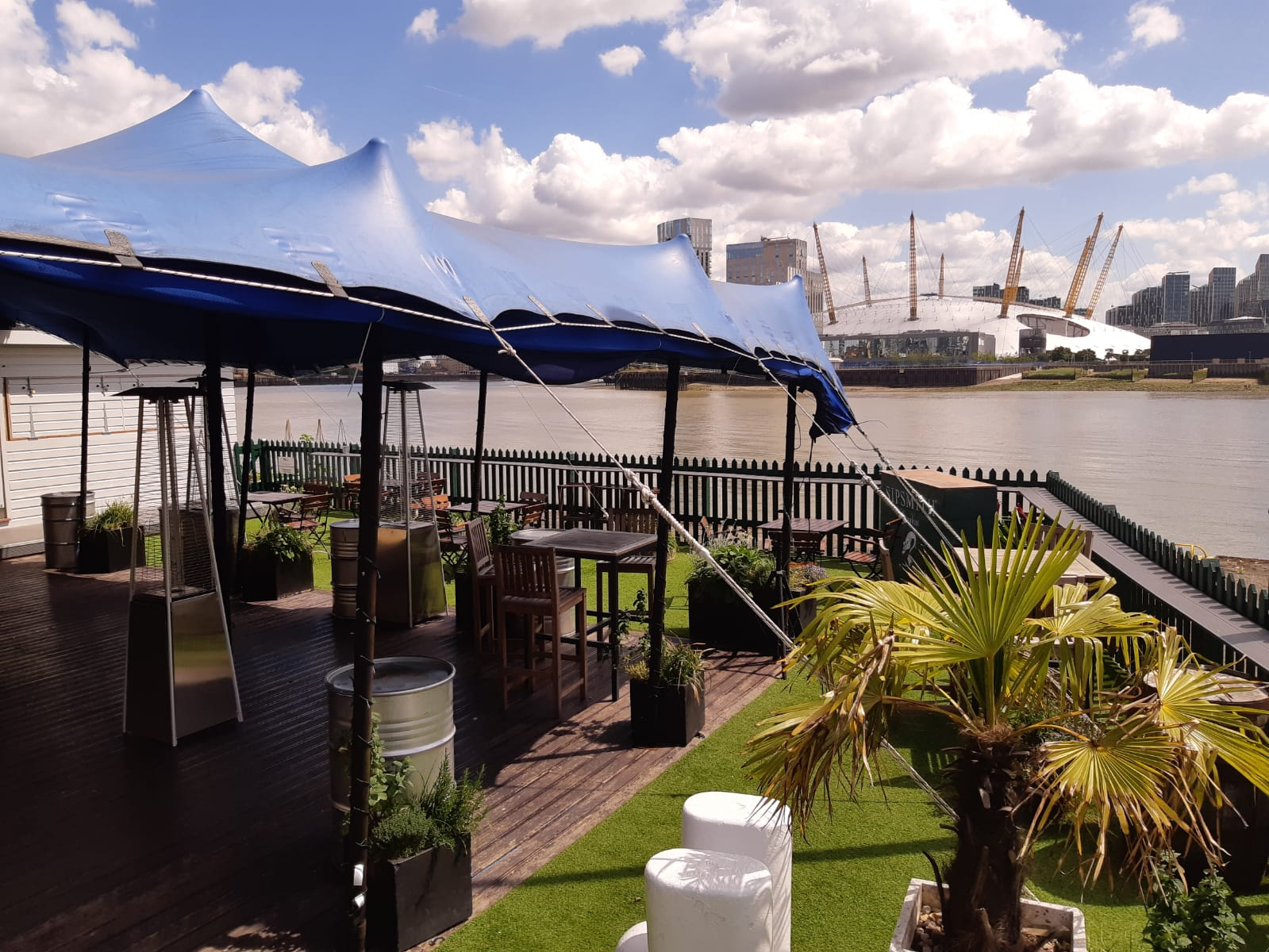
Gin Garden at The Gun with summer marquee

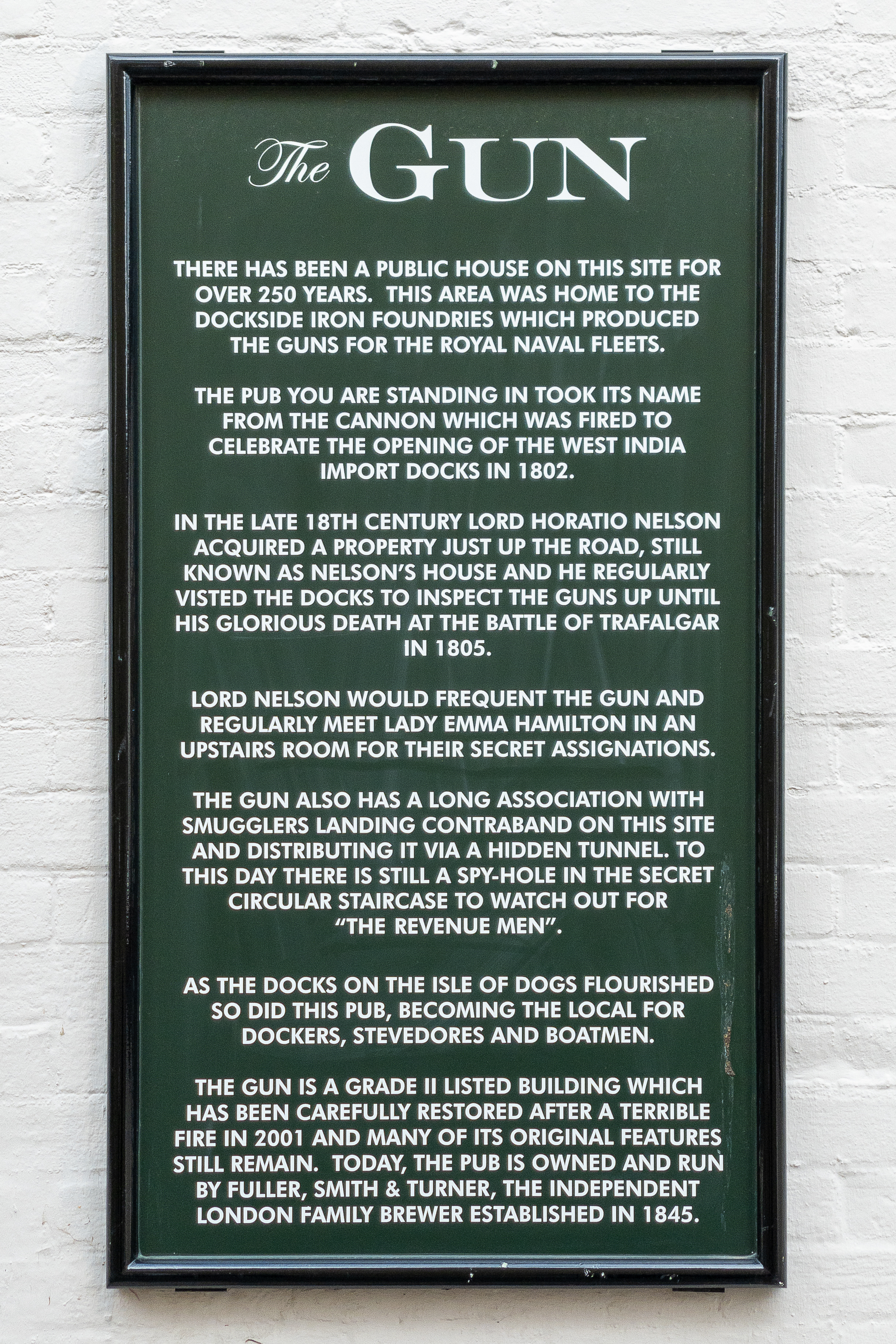
Plaque outside The Gun
