= Spatial inequality =

Inequality across geographical regions

Spatial inequality refers to the unequal distribution of resources and income across geographical regions. Attributable to local differences in infrastructure, geographical features (presence of mountains, coastlines, particular climates, etc.) and economies of agglomeration, such inequality remains central to public policy discussions regarding economic inequality more broadly.

Whilst jobs located in urban areas tend to have higher nominal wages (unadjusted for differences in price levels or inflation) than rural areas, the cost of living and availability of skilled work correlates to regional divergences in real income and output. Additionally, the spatial component of public infrastructure affects access to quality healthcare and education (key elements of human capital and worker productivity, which directly impacts economic well-being).

Variation in both natural resource composition and quality of regional infrastructure are traditionally considered to be motivating factors for migration patterns between urban cities and rural areas. This, in turn, impacts the concentration of specific industries and sectors within a given area, as well as the investment choices made by local governments, thus perpetuating spatially-based disparities. However, there remain significant challenges in carrying out empirical research to quantify these disparities (particularly within a given nation, as opposed to across different nations), due to lack of region-specific datasets, the level of geographical disaggregation required to reveal such trends, as well as the inherent differences in incomes and living costs across different communities.

In The Sociology of Spatial Inequality (2007), editors Linda M. Lobao, Gregory Hooks, and Ann R. Tickamyer argue that sociology's traditional question of "who gets what and why" must be expanded to "who gets what where," positioning geographic space as a fundamental dimension of social stratification alongside race, class, and gender.

== Determinants ==
=== Urbanization and economies of agglomeration ===
The relationship between population density and productivity is a significant factor affecting the difference in economic capital, cultural capital, and social capital found between cities and rural areas. In particular, the clustering of agriculture activities versus manufacturing activities informs much of the urban-rural wage gap, as industrial jobs tend to earn higher wages than their counterparts in the agricultural sector. The rate at which this clustering of jobs occurs provides a partial explanation as to why different communities undergo urbanization at different rates. From this, the theory of the core-periphery model in urban economics suggests that manufacturing tends to form the "core" of an industrial cluster, with agricultural activity tending to take place on the "periphery" of such urban formations. This affects the organizational set-up of linkages throughout supply chains, as agricultural goods and resources (directly outputted from agricultural processes) are then transported inwards towards the urbanized center of the region. Such patterns permit greater economies of scale to be realized, as different economic activities become concentrated in regions that are best suited for such work, and transportation costs can be reduced accordingly.

Agglomeration economies refer to the benefits gained from such industrial clustering and city-formation. With the observed savings in transportation costs from this phenomenon being central to the study of economic geography, the positive externalities (indirect benefits gained from third-party activities) afforded by such urbanization (and the mechanisms by which they occur) remain to be of interest for academic studies and public policy considerations.

Population concentration and the clustering of particular industries also allows for the pooling of workers, which results in local business needs and workers' specific skillsets becoming better aligned. Such specialization also allows for knowledge spillovers and greater exchange of ideas, as similar firms can more easily and dynamically interact with one another. This can assist in gaining a comparative advantage with respect to a particular industry or sector, which can be especially beneficial for realizing gains from trade when interacting with other communities and regions which are not as specialized, thus resulting in more geography-based disparities in economic activity.

=== Natural resources and geographical features ===
Natural resource availability affects industry prevalence, as economic activities which are heavily dependent on specific natural resources tend to cluster around suitable geographical regions and climates.

Localities which have a heavy reliance on agricultural jobs require favorable climate conditions for crop production and harvesting. For instance, empirical evidence from Ghana points towards the impact of such spatial inequities on the quality of natural resources available. Although employment in the northern regions of the nation is heavily reliant on the agricultural sector, there is limited access to irrigation and modern implements needed for efficient farming. Such unsustainable farming practices have led to natural resource depreciation over time, including lower quality of soil and higher rates of erosion, which in turn impacts the region's ability to continue engaging in future crop production. In addition, in the face of erratic weather patterns, global warming, and climate change, these challenges have been exacerbated by distorted rainfall patterns and increasingly frequent crop failures.

The resource curse theory suggests that an over-reliance of employment on abundance of natural resources (including forestry, fossil fuels, mineral deposits, etc.) can lead to instability and volatile prices. However, the exogenously determined geographical features of the area directly determines the region's ability to produce traditional agricultural goods and exports. Therefore, such externally determined geographical and climate features informs the composition of employment in the region.

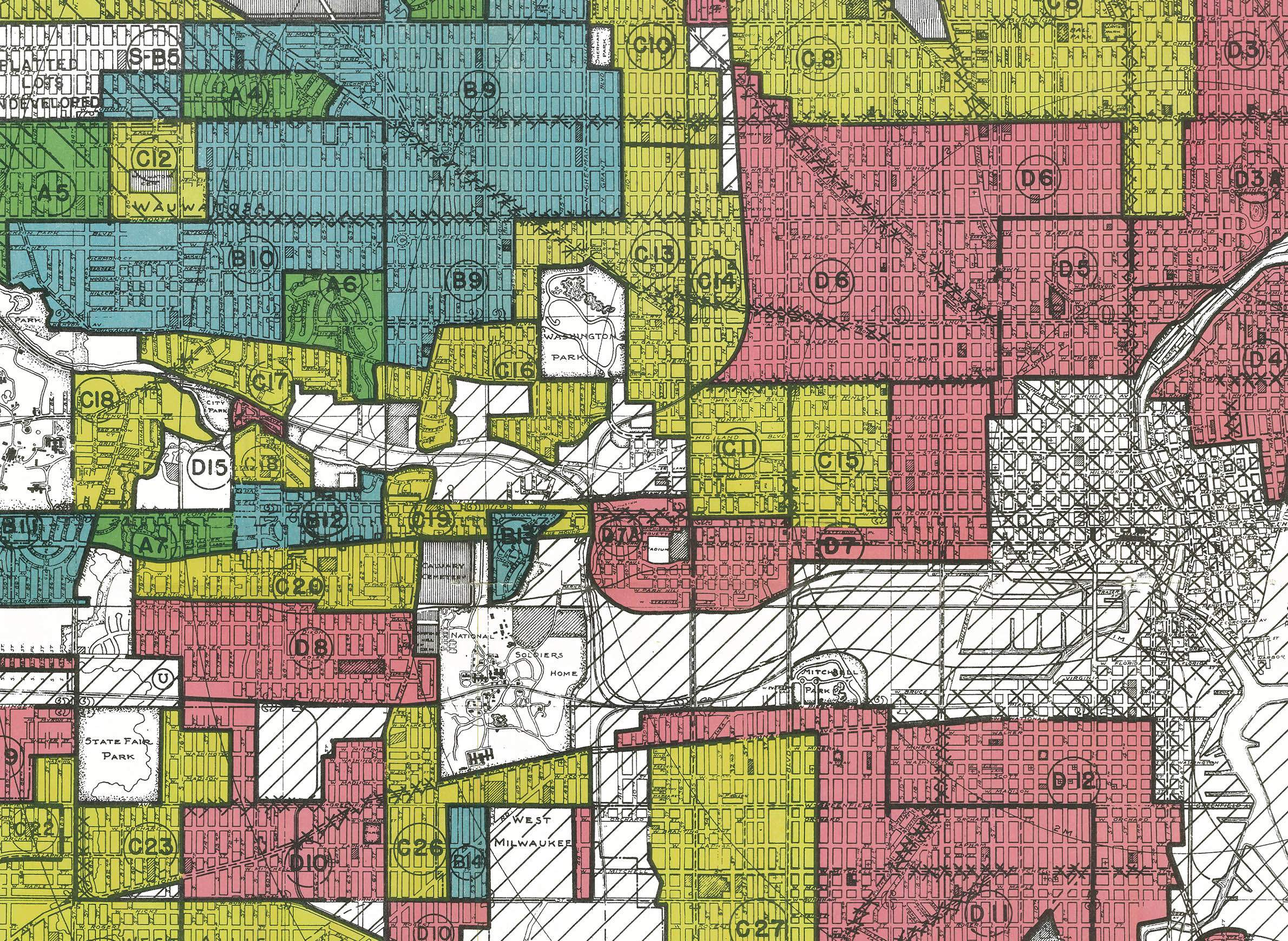
Redlining in the United States is an example of spatial inequality, whereby racially discriminatory lending practices resulted in subprime mortgages becoming highly concentrated amongst particular neighborhoods and communities.

=== Regional infrastructure ===
Regions with access to strong transportation networks (including highways, railways, airports etc.) are more likely to benefit from external trade in comparison to remote regions. As transportation costs and logistics inform much of the clustering of economic activity within a region, the geographical concentration of particular industries informs the extent to which particular physical infrastructures must be developed and invested in to support the needs of specific localities.

Social infrastructural components, which impact health and education standards (hospitals, schools, public libraries, etc.) additionally influence quality-of-life conditions and the well-being of workers, and thus their choices with respect to selecting regions/ communities to live in. As such, city planning and the provision of public infrastructure and services remains essential to public policy considerations for rapidly urbanizing communities.

In particular, people living in regions with poor infrastructure and public services are at a greater risk of poor health and wellbeing. This includes limited access to both healthcare, as well as quality and nutritious food. Such impacts compound over time, leaving individuals to become more susceptible to future health problems and illnesses. For instance, the spatial patterns of such environmental factors and hospital accessibility can impact public health outcomes, such as COVID-19 infection, spread, and mortality rates within a nation.

Furthermore, as families of similar incomes tend to cluster, further segregation of socio-economic classes is propagated by schooling environments. This adversely effects the opportunities available to children from low-income backgrounds, and reduces the ability for social mobility needed to escape the poverty trap and generational poverty. An example of this phenomenon in the United States includes redlining - a racially discriminatory historical practice, which resulted in subprime mortgages becoming highly concentrated to specific neighborhoods and geographies.

=== Investment choices, trade, and migration ===
As different communities may not have similar comparative advantage due to variations in natural resource composition and abundance, foreign trade and globalization are thought to play a key role in influencing spatial inequality as well. In particular, economies undergoing rapid trade liberalization have been observed to actually have increases in poverty rates and income inequality, in spite of nation-wide benefits of economic growth being realized, as urban-rural gaps tend to widen. Additionally, migration patterns from rural to urban areas in developing nations are observed to be a labor market adjustment to an increasing shift in importance from agriculture to manufacturing.

== Measurement ==
There remains no academic consensus on whether trends in spatial inequalities over time are causes of region-based differences in income, or rather the symptoms of other socio-economic disparities. Furthermore, the complex and intertwined relationships between geographical features, urbanization, availability of infrastructure, and access to public resources further complicates empirical research.

=== Output and productivity ===
The distribution of income within a nation can first be nominally estimated from local datasets, and then subsequently adjusted to account for regional differences in price levels. Such a procedure allows for comparisons to be made in real-terms and across different localities, which is especially pertinent when national-level inequalities are mostly influenced by regional disparities in income and cost of living. However, the level of disaggregation (granularity of geo-spatial units considered) and the number of localities selected for comparison varies across academic studies. For instance, geographic sub-groups can be considered at the state level, as an urban/rural divide, or even within-component (differences between households belonging to the same group or community). Typical econometric studies will then design and use regression models to analyze the effects of density, industry location, or related variables on regional differences in output or costs.

While nominal wages tend to be higher in cities and urban regions, the same is not necessarily true of real wages, as rising housing costs and expenses tend to offset these benefits.

=== Empirical challenges ===
The availability and reliability of local data remains a barrier to accurate estimation in academic studies. The typical limitations of econometric studies may also impact the soundness of empirical results and conclusions. As such, there remains no unified theory within economic geography to provide a broadly accepted causal explanation for spatial inequality.

In particular, an inherent difficulty in comparing urban and rural regions is the vast disparity in quality and variety of goods and services enjoyed by the typical household in either type of community. Furthermore, differences in disposable income and composition of spending pose further challenges to comparative approaches.

Whist the Gini coefficient and Theil index remain as popular income inequality metrics, these summary statistics do not allow for the decomposition of inequality into multiple dimensions, and thus are insufficient for the multi-faceted analysis required to study spatially dependent inequalities.

== See also ==
- Concentrated poverty – Concept in sociology
- Economic Inequality – Distribution of income or wealth between different groups
- Economies of agglomeration – Cost advantages from spatial concentration
- Gains from trade – Net benefits to economic agents
- Poverty map – Spatial representation of economic inequality
- Redlining – Systemic denial of services to some areas
- Returns to scale – Microeconomic concept
- Urban economics – Economic study of urban areas
- Urbanization – Process of population movement to cities
- Rural Development – Improving quality of life in rural areas
