= Charles Booth (social reformer) =

British social researcher (1840–1916)

The Right Honourable Charles Booth
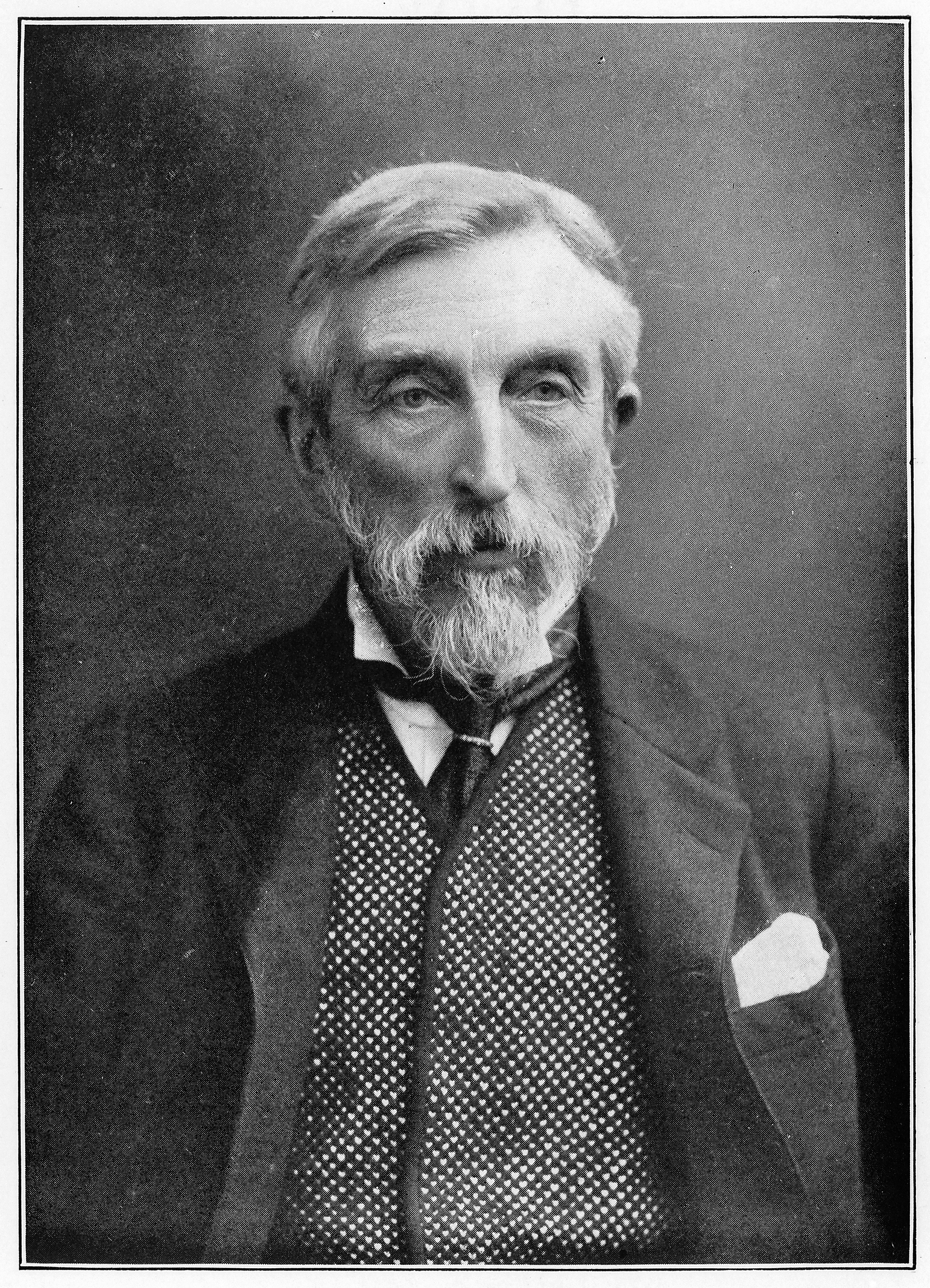
- Born: 30 March 1840; Liverpool, Lancashire, England
- Died: 23 November 1916 (aged 76); Thringstone, Leicestershire, England
- Resting place: St Andrew's, Thringstone
- Occupations: Shipowner and social reformer
- Notable work: Life and Labour of the People in London
- Spouse: Mary née Macaulay
- Awards: Guy Medal

Charles James Booth (30 March 1840 – 23 November 1916) was a British shipowner, Comtean positivist, social researcher, and reformer, best known for his innovative philanthropic studies on working-class life in London towards the end of the 19th century.

During the 1860s Booth became interested in the philosophy of Auguste Comte, the founder of modern sociology, and converted to his Religion of Humanity, affiliated with members of the London Positivist Society, and wrote positivist prayers. He was captivated by Comte's idea that in the future, scientific industrialists would be in control of the social leadership instead of the church ministers. Booth's work, followed by that of Seebohm Rowntree, influenced government policy regarding poverty in the early 20th century and helped initiate Old Age pensions and free school meals for the poorest children. In addition, his research would also demonstrate how poverty was influenced by religion, education, and administration.

Booth is best known for his multi-volume book Life and Labour of the People in London (1902), which focuses on the statistics he collected regarding poverty in London. Life and Labour "discusses a range of social conditions in which it reported that it appeared people are likely to be poor or on the margins of poverty." Booth is also recognised for influencing the transition of social attitudes from the Victorian Age to the 20th century.

Due to his investigations on poverty, some honour Charles Booth as one of the founding fathers of social administration, and regard his work crucial when studying social policy.

== Early life and education ==
Coat of arms of the Booth family

Born at Liverpool, Lancashire, on 30 March 1840 to Charles Booth and Emily Fletcher, his father was a wealthy shipowner and corn merchant as well as being a prominent Unitarian. He attended the Royal Institution School in Liverpool before being apprenticed in the family business at the age of sixteen. He joined his brother, Alfred Booth, in the leather trade in 1862 and together they established a successful shipping line, in which Charles remained actively involved until his retirement in 1912.

Booth became alienated from the dominant, nonconformist business class of Liverpool into which he had been born.

== Career ==
Booth's father died in 1860, bequeathing him control of the family business. He entered the skinning and leather business with his elder brother Alfred, and they set up Alfred Booth and Company establishing offices in Liverpool and New York City with a £20,000 inheritance. In 1865 Booth campaigned for the Liberals in Toxteth, Liverpool, albeit unsuccessfully.

After learning the shipping trade, Booth was able to persuade Alfred and his sister Emily to invest in steamships and established a service to Pará, Maranhão, and Ceará in Brazil. Then in 1866 Charles and Alfred Booth commenced the start of a shipping service between Brazil and Europe named the Booth Steamship Company. Charles himself went on the first voyage to Brazil on 14 February 1866. He was also involved in the building of a harbor at Manaus which overcame seasonal fluctuations in water levels. Booth described this as his "monument" (to shipping) when he visited Manaus for the last time in 1912. Booth would write letters to his wife describing the business problems that would rise such as personnel management, decision making, and factory relocation; this laid a foundation for the fundamentals of business ethics. Booth Shipping Line's biggest rival was R. Singlehurst and Company, but Booth kept calm while managing business affairs.

Booth initially engaged in politics, canvassing unsuccessfully for the Liberal Party in the General Election of 1865. Following the Conservative Party victory in municipal elections in 1866, his interest in active politics waned. This result changed Booth's attitude, when he concluded that he could contribute more by commissioning social studies, rather than by being a representative in Parliament.

=== Social research ===
Hand coloured map of London poverty covering the area around Buckingham Palace

In 1886, influenced earlier by positivism, Booth embarked on his major survey of London life and labour conditions for which he became famous and commonly regarded as initiating the systematic study of poverty in Britain. Booth was critical of the existing statistical data on poverty. By analyzing census returns he argued that they were unsatisfactory, later being invited to sit on a parliamentary committee in 1891 which suggested improvements that could be made to them. Due to the scale of the survey, results were published serially but it took over fifteen years before the full seventeen volume edition was published. His work on the study and his concern with the problems of poverty led to an involvement in campaigning for old-age pensions and promoting the decasualisation of labour.

The survey of life and labour began with a pilot study in Tower Hamlets. Booth then hired numerous researchers to assist with the full study of the whole of London, which investigated the three main topics of poverty, occupations, and religion. Among his researchers were his cousin Beatrice Potter (Beatrice Webb) and the chapter on women's work was conducted by the budding economist Clara Collet. This research, which looked at the incidence of pauperism in the East End of London – which he defined in 1889 as the County of London between the City of London and the River Lea (present day London Borough of Tower Hamlets and adjacent portions of Shoreditch, South Hackney and Homerton in the London Borough of Hackney), therefore excluding parts of London in Essex – showed that 35% were living in abject poverty, even higher than the original figure. This work was published under the title Life and Labour of the People in 1889. A second volume, entitled Labour and Life of the People, covering the rest of London, appeared in 1891. (Note: The reversal of the words in the title of the second volume was due to the original title "Life and Labour" being claimed by Samuel Smiles who wrote a similarly titled book in 1887) Booth also popularised the idea of a "poverty line", a concept conceived by the London School Board. Booth set this line at 10 to 20 shillings a week, which he considered to be the minimum amount necessary for a family of 4 or 5 people to subsist.

After the first two volumes were published Booth expanded his research. This investigation was carried out by Booth himself with his team of researchers. Nonetheless, Booth continued to oversee his successful shipping business which funded his philanthropic work. The fruit of this research was a second expanded edition of his original work, published as Life and Labour of the People in London in nine volumes between 1892 and 1897. A third edition (now expanded to seventeen volumes) appeared in 1902–3.

Booth used his work to argue for the introduction of Old Age Pensions which he described as "limited socialism". Booth suggested that such reforms would help prevent a socialist revolution from occurring in Britain. Booth was far from tempted by the ideals of socialism, but had sympathy with the working classes and, as part of his investigations, he took lodgings with working-class families and recorded his thoughts and findings in his diaries.

=== London poverty maps ===
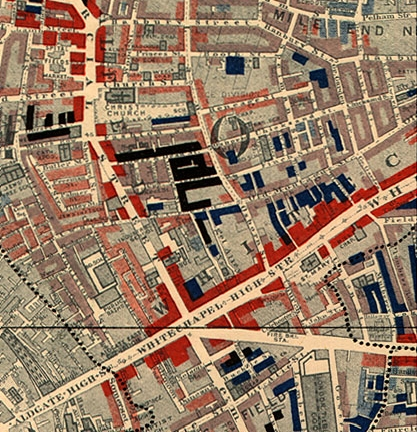
Part of Booth's map of Whitechapel, 1889. The red areas are "well-to-do"; the black areas are "semi-criminal".

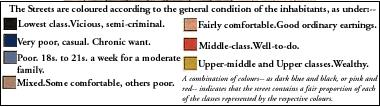
Colour key for Booth's poverty map.

From 1886 to 1903, while Charles Booth was conducting his landmark survey on the life and labour of London's poorest inhabitants he created poverty maps to illustrate the conditions of the lives of these people. Booth's maps were based on observations of differences in lifestyle and focused on qualitative factors: food, clothing, shelter, and relative deprivation. Booth and his team of researchers visited every street in London to assess each household's class. The household's class was determined by the letters A–H, with A–D constituting want, and E-H representing comfort. Booth's maps colour-coded every street to determine and demonstrate the level of poverty or comfort. The colour-coding was also used to highlight the social conditions of the households on the streets. The objective was to expose to Victorian society the social evil, which is the problem of poverty. The maps have a strong impact on the poverty debate. Many who analyzed the maps noted how there existed greater concentrations of poverty south of the Thames, compared to the East End Slums. The colour palette of the maps also played a large role in how poverty was viewed. Areas with high concentrations of poverty were given dense and dark colours, while areas that were considered comfortable were given bright colours such as pink, blue, and red. The maps were attempting to demonstrate that the issue of poverty was a manageable problem. The importance of Booth's work in social statistics was recognised by the Royal Statistical Society when in 1892 he was elected President and was awarded its first Guy Medal in Gold. In 1899 he was elected a Fellow of the Royal Society.

For the purposes of poverty measurement, Booth divided the working population into eight classes, from the poorest to the best off, labeled A–H. These categories summarised economic circumstances but also had a moral dimension, with "A" representing the "feckless, deviant or criminal" groups.

=== "Religious Influences" series ===
During 1897, Charles Booth had spent a significant amount of money and a decade of his life studying the life conditions of the poor of late Victorian London. When reaching the final years of his survey, Booth asked himself this question: "What role can religion play in these conditions?" This question then led to 6 years of him and his team conducting 1,800 interviews focusing on London's religious and secular leaders. With all the information collected Booth and his team created seven volumes called the "Religious Influences" series. The series showed how there was less conflict in the late 19th-century debate over "charity organisation". Booth and his team of investigators discovered how the clergymen, women, and working people enjoyed engaging in the strict allocation of charity. The churchmen had the responsibility of selecting who needed charity. Many believed that overindulgence would lead to corruption. The Booth team were advocates for charity organisations but also believed that to "form character" that it would be beneficial to give little to nothing. The Booth interviews focused more on the money that the churchmen gave to those in poverty and had no current job than the actual influence on the church's "religious influence". Booth believed that the charity the church was giving to the poor was being wasted. Therefore, towards the end of his survey, Booth makes the proposition to abolish church relief work, and that officials would have the responsibility to assist those who would benefit greatly.

=== Politics ===
Booth declined subsequent offers from PM William Ewart Gladstone of elevation to the peerage (barony then viscountcy) to sit in the House of Lords. Booth engaged in Joseph Chamberlain's Birmingham Education League (1869-1877), a survey which looked into levels of work and education in Liverpool. The survey found that 25,000 children in Liverpool were neither in school or work.

In 1904, Booth was sworn of the Privy Council.

Although his attitudes towards poverty might make him seem fairly Left-wing, Booth became more conservative in his views in later life. While some of his investigators, such as Beatrice Webb, became Socialists as a result of their research, Booth was critical of the way in which the Liberal Government appeared to support Trade Unions after winning the 1906 General Election.

== Later life ==
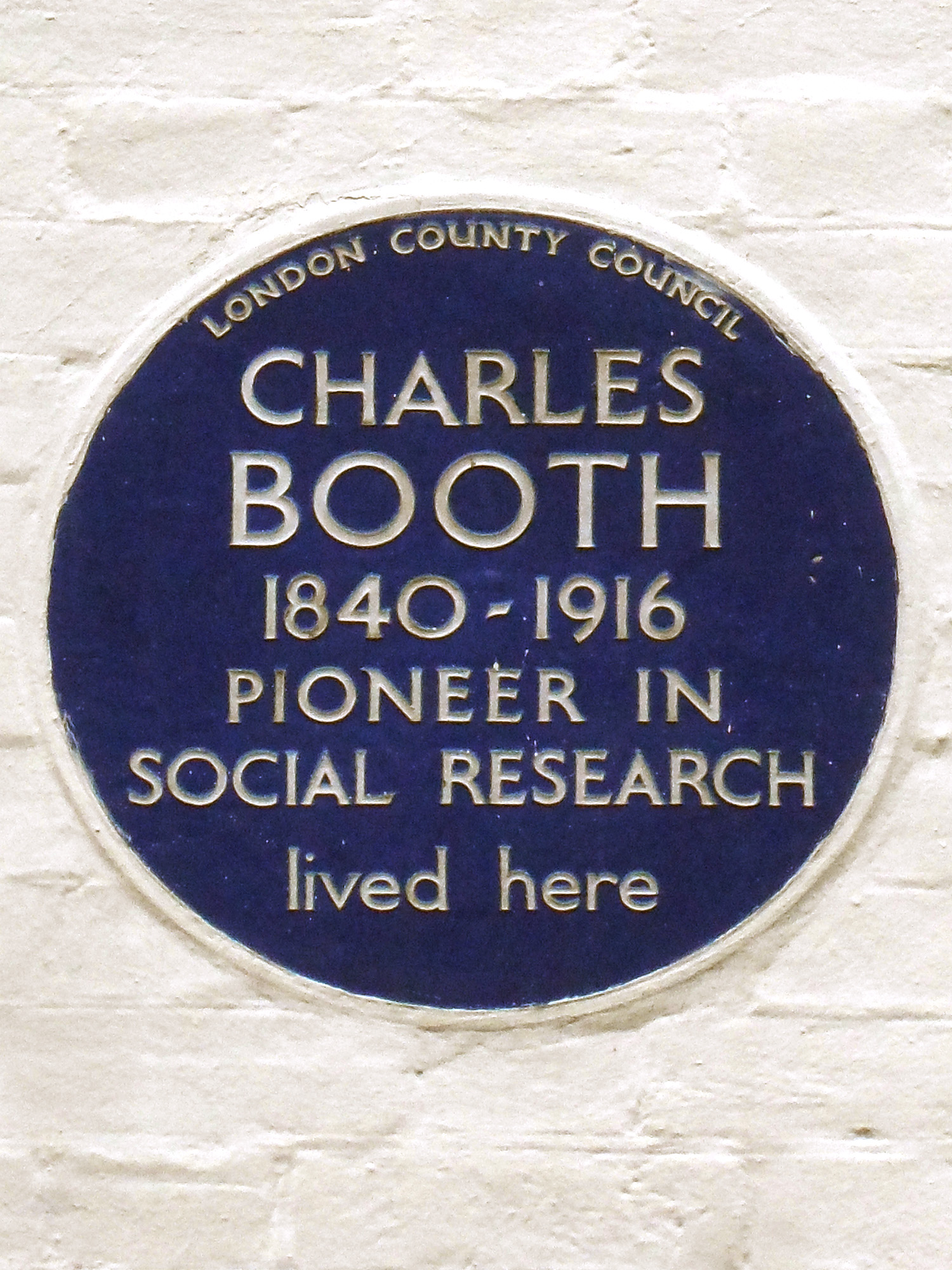
Blue plaque in memory of Charles Booth at 6 Grenville Place, London SW7.

Booth purchased William Holman Hunt's painting The Light of The World, which he donated to the Dean and Chapter of St Paul's in 1908.

Early in 1912 Booth stood down as chairman of Alfred Booth and Company in favour of his nephew Alfred Allen Booth but in 1915 returned willingly to work under wartime exigencies despite growing evidence of heart disease.

== Personal life and death ==
On 19 April 1871, Charles Booth married Mary Macaulay, and the couple settled in London. The niece of the historian Thomas Babington Macaulay, she was a cousin of the Fabian socialist and author, Beatrice Webb. Mary had a reputation for being well-educated and intelligent. Also, Mary was an advisor to Booth in his business affairs and played an active role in contributing to Booth's survey of London life and labour conditions.

Charles and Mary Booth had 7 children, 3 sons, and 4 daughters. His eldest daughter Antonia married the Hon Sir Malcolm Macnaghten, and others married into the Ritchie and Gore Browne families.

In 1886, the Booth family moved to Grace Dieu Manor near Thringstone, Leicestershire, and this is where Charles retired to. Before he died, he hosted many family gatherings in order to be surrounded by his friends, children and grandchildren. He died on 23 November 1916 of a stroke and was buried in Saint Andrew's churchyard. A memorial dedicated to him stands on Thringstone village green, and a blue plaque has been erected on his house in South Kensington: 6 Grenville Place.

== Impact and legacy ==
Life and Labour of the People in London can be seen as one of the founding texts of British sociology, drawing on both quantitative (statistical) methods and qualitative methods (particularly ethnography). It influenced Jane Addams and other Hull House reformers, W. E. B. Du Bois, the Chicago School of sociology (notably the work of Robert E. Park), and the community studies associated with the Institute of Community Studies in East London.

Booth's poverty maps revealed that there is a spatial component to poverty as well as an environmental context of poverty. Before his maps, environmental explanations of poverty mainly interested health professionals; Booth brought environmental issues into an empirical sociological investigation.

In addition to Booth's influence on the field of sociology, he influenced other academics as well. Sir Hubert Llewellyn Smith's repeat London survey was inspired by Booth.

Booth's work served as an impetus for Seebohm Rowntree (1871 – 1954); he also influenced Beatrice Webb (1858 – 1943) and Helen Bosanquet (1860 – 1925).

The University of Liverpool appoints academics to the Charles Booth Chair of Social Sciences and has a collection of his manuscripts and typescript.

The London School of Economics keeps his work on an online searchable database, planned to include Booth's unpublished notebooks, recommended by participants in a 2021 BBC Radio broadcast on his work as vivid narratives of Booth's methods and personal response to his discoveries, but omitted from his formal publications.

== Criticisms ==
The London poverty maps survey has been negatively criticised for its methodology. According to Professor Paul Spicker in 1990, "Charles Booth's studies of poverty are widely misrepresented in the literature of social policy. His work is commonly bracketed with Rowntree's but his methods were quite different. His definition of poverty was explicitly relative; he based the description of poverty on class rather than income. He did not attempt to define need nor to identify subsistence levels of income on the basis of minimum needs; his "poverty line" was used as an indicator of poverty, not a definition. His approach was to identify the sorts of condition in which people were poor and to describe those conditions in a variety of ways. To this end he used a wide range of qualitative and quantitative methods in an attempt to add depth and weight to his descriptions of poverty."

Booth used school board visitors—those who undertook to ensure the attendance of children at school—to collect information on the circumstances of families. However, his extrapolation from these findings to families without school-age children was speculative. Moreover, his "definitions" of the poverty levels of household "classes" were general descriptive categories, which did not equate to specific criteria. Although the seventeen volumes were dense with often fascinating detail, it was primarily descriptive rather than analytical.

Booth's 1902 study included antisemitic references to the impact of Jewish immigration, comparing it to the "slow rising of a flood" and that "no Gentile could live in the same house with these poor foreign Jews, and even as neighbors they are unpleasant; and, since people of this race, though sometimes quarrelsome amongst themselves, are extremely gregarious and sociable, each small street or group of houses invaded tends to become entirely Jewish".

In 2006, Booth also received criticism for his London Poverty Maps, showing in dark and opaque colours the houses and streets where poor people lived. The palette made the areas appear as cancer or a disease to be eradicated, creating a negative connotation for that community. Nevertheless, the scaling of the map made it appear that fixing the problem would be manageable.

Booth is often compared to Seebohm Rowntree due to their concepts on poverty. Even though Rowntree's work draws upon Booth's investigation, many writers on poverty generally turn their attention towards Rowntree's, because his concept clearly addressed the problem of defining a subsistence level of poverty. Both Booth and Rowntree were positivists; however, many differences between Booth and Rowntree's methodology existed. While Booth classified people by their source of income, Rowntree made distinctions through class and specifically categorised groups by their economic relationships.

== Selected works ==
- Life and Labour of the People, 1st ed., Vol. I. (1889).
- Labour and Life of the People, 1st ed., Vol II. (1891).
- Life and Labour of the People in London, 2nd ed., (1892–97); 9 vols.
- Life and Labour of the People in London, 3rd ed., (1902–03); 17 vols.

== See also ==
- Booth baronets
- Alfred Booth and Company
