= Life and Labour of the People in London =

Books by Charles Booth, 1889 to 1903

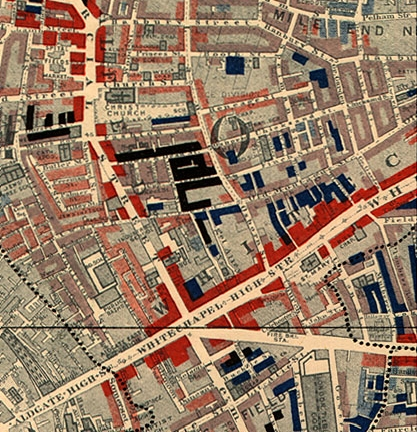
Part of Booth's poverty map showing Whitechapel in 1889. The red areas are "well-to-do" and black areas are the "lowest class...occasional labourers, street sellers, loafers, criminals and semi-criminals".

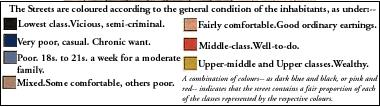
Colour key for Booth's poverty map.

Life and Labour of the People in London was a multi-volume book by Charles Booth which provided a survey of the lives and occupations of the working class of late 19th-century London. The first edition was published in two volumes as Life and Labour of the People, Vol. I (1889) and Labour and Life of the People, Vol. II (1891). The second edition was entitled Life and Labour of the People in London, and was produced in nine volumes 1892–97. A third edition, running to a grand total of 17 volumes, appeared 1902–03.

A noteworthy feature of the study was the production of maps describing poverty (see illustration on the right). Levels of wealth and poverty found by the research's investigators were mapped out on a street-by-street basis.

The notebooks used to carry out this investigation are held at the Archives Division of the British Library of Political and Economic Science (London School of Economics and Political Science).

== See also ==
- 19th-century London
- Costermonger
- Poverty map
