= Racial invariance =

Hypothesis about structural disadvantages in criminological theory

In criminology, racial invariance refers to a hypothesis that the effects of structural disadvantage on rates of violent crime are the same for all racial groups. This hypothesis is a major component of structural perspectives on the causes of crime, such as social disorganization theory and anomie. It can be traced back to William Julius Wilson's 1987 book The Truly Disadvantaged, which argued that racial differences in crime rates are due to differences in the communities in which American whites and blacks live. Since then, it has become a major component of the general theory of crime.
