= Criticism of welfare =

Social philosophy

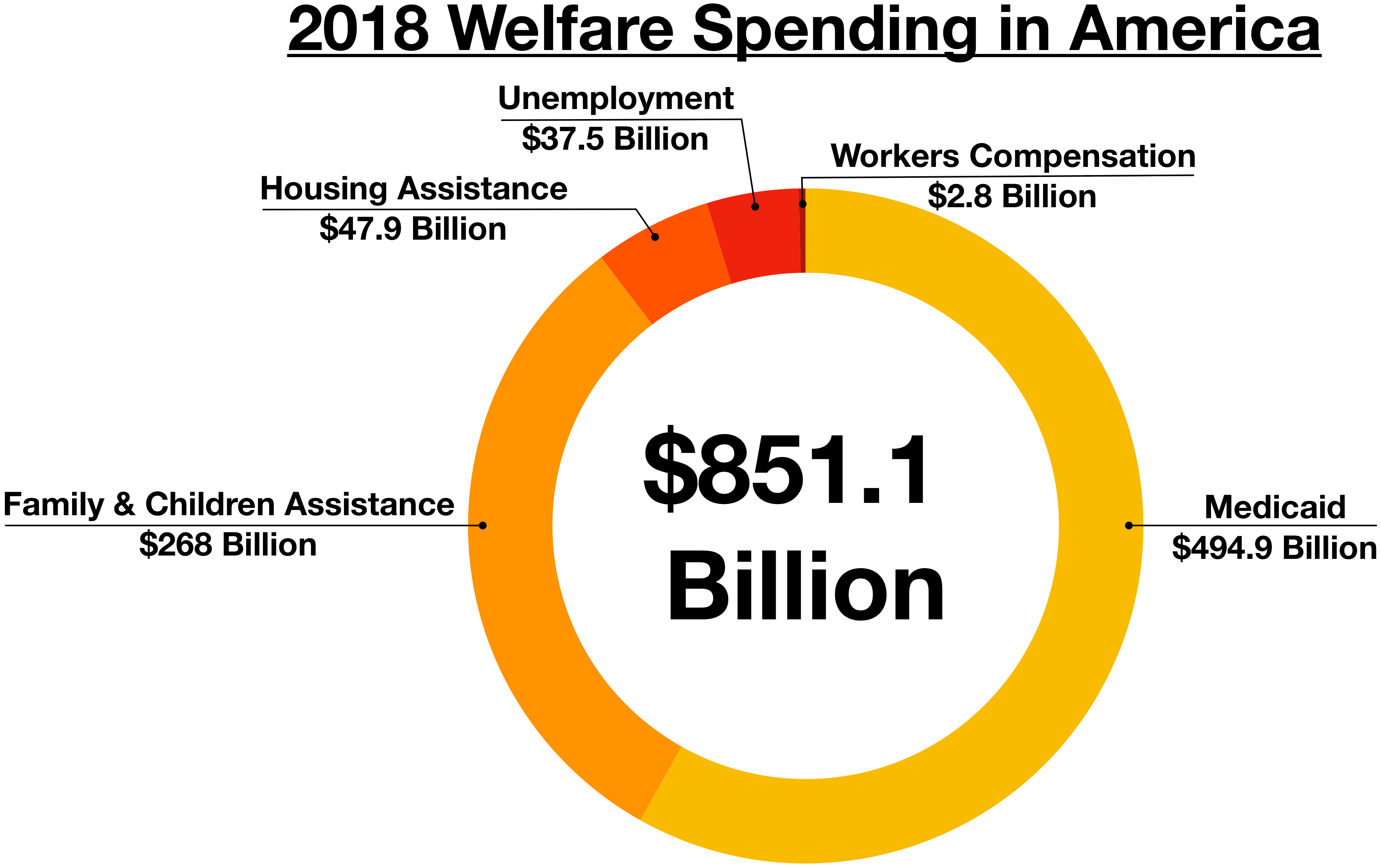

The modern welfare state has been criticized on economic and moral grounds from all ends of the political spectrum. Many have argued that the provision of tax-funded services or transfer payments reduces the incentive for workers to seek employment, thereby reducing the need to work, reducing the rewards of work and exacerbating poverty. On the other hand, socialists typically criticize the welfare state as championed by social democrats as an attempt to legitimize and strengthen the capitalist economic system which conflicts with the socialist goal of replacing capitalism with a socialist economic system.

== Conservative criticism ==
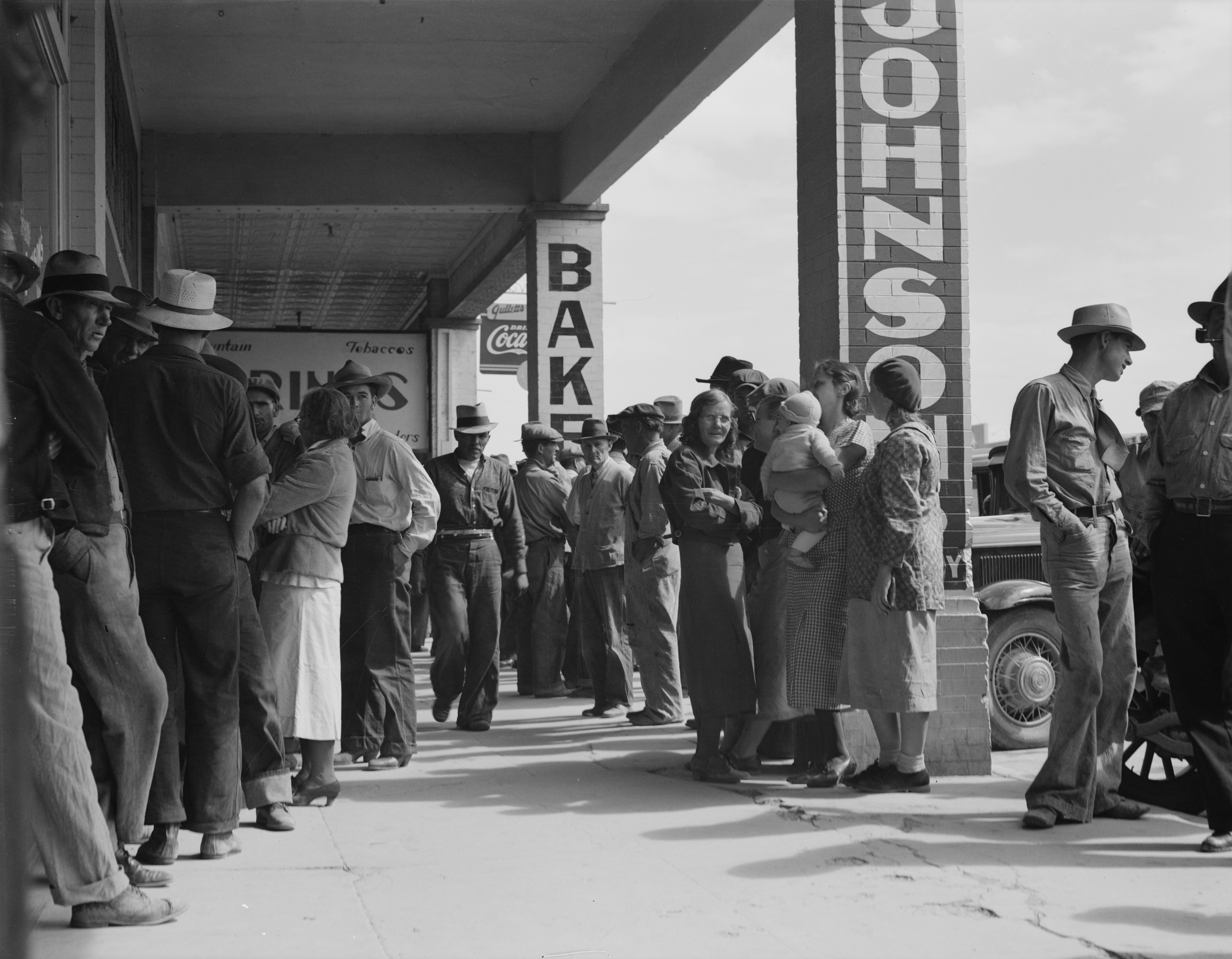
People waiting in line for relief checks in the United States during the Great Depression

In his 1912 book The Servile State, Anglo-French poet and social critic Hilaire Belloc, a devout Roman Catholic, argued that capitalism was inherently unstable, but that attempts to amend its defects through ever-more burdensome regulation could only lead to the rise of what he calls the "Servile State". According to Belloc, this servile state resembles ancient slavery in its reliance on positive law as opposed to custom or economic necessity by themselves. Austrian-born economist Friedrich Hayek mentions Belloc's Servile State favorably in his book The Road to Serfdom. Along with others such as G. K. Chesterton and Eric Gill, Belloc advocated abolishing profit-making banking in favor of credit unions and replacing capitalism with a system they called distributism which they believed would preserve private property and revive the dignity of work exemplified by the small craftsmen and property holders of the Middle Ages.

Some conservatives in the United Kingdom such as James Batholomew and Theodore Dalrymple claim that the welfare state has produced a generation of dependents who prefer to remain on assistance and make no real effort to find employment, even though assistance is officially only available to those unable to work or who are temporarily unable to find work. The welfare state in the United Kingdom was created to provide certain people with a basic level of benefits in order to alleviate poverty, but these conservatives believe that it has fostered irresponsible and immature attitudes in many of its recipients.

Some British conservatives such as Conservative Party co-chairman Sayeeda Warsi also criticize the "'something for nothing' culture" of the welfare state, claiming that the high extent of the welfare state "discourages the unemployed from finding jobs" (Welfare trap). 55% of people in England and 43% of people in Scotland believe that "benefits for unemployed people are too high and discourage them from finding jobs".

According to political scientist Alan Ryan, "[m]odern conservatives argue that liberalism promises a degree of personal fulfillment that the welfare state cannot deliver and that attempts to deliver it will inevitably lead to disillusionment". Additionally, citizens' resentment of paying taxes to create benefits for others creates "hostility between more and less favored groups that is wholly at odds with what modern liberals desire". Ryan also argued:

Moreover, the welfare state must employ an extensive bureaucracy whose members are granted discretionary powers and charged by law to use those powers for the welfare of their clients. This means that classical liberals' concern for the rule of law and the curtailing of arbitrary discretion is ignored: bureaucrats are given resources to disburse to their clients. [...] The liberation the welfare state promises – liberation from anxiety, poverty, and the cramped circumstances of working-class existence – is easily obtained by the educated middle class and is impossible to achieve for most others. There is thus a grave risk of disillusionment with liberalism in general as a result of its failure when it overextends itself. Some writers suppose that the worldwide popularity of conservative governments during the 1980s is explained by this consideration.

Conservative and libertarian groups such as The Heritage Foundation and the Cato Institute argue that welfare creates dependence, a disincentive to work and reduces the opportunity of individuals to manage their own lives. This dependence is called a "culture of poverty", which is said to undermine people from finding meaningful work. Many of these groups also point to the large budget used to maintain these programs and assert that it is wasteful.

In the book Losing Ground, Charles Murray argues that welfare not only increases poverty, but also increases other problems such as single-parent households, and crime.

== Liberal and libertarian criticism ==
Advocates of classical liberalism, economic liberalism and neoliberalism such as adherents of the Chicago school of economics like Milton Friedman faulted the New Deal version of social insurance for creating "notches" that perverted economic incentives, with J. Bradford DeLong arguing:

The government, Milton Friedman and others argued, told the poor: make more money and we will take away your free housing, food stamps, and income support. People are rational, Friedman said, so they will not work for long if they get nothing or next to nothing for it. The big difference between the Malthusian conservative critics of social insurance in the early nineteenth century and the Chicago critics of the 1970s is that the Chicago critics had a point: Providing public support to the "worthy" poor, and then removing it when they began to stand on their own feet, poisoned incentives and was unlikely to lead to good outcomes. And so, from 1970 to 2000, a broad coalition of conservatives (who wanted to see the government stop encouraging immorality), centrists (who wanted government money spent effectively), and leftists (who wanted poverty alleviated) removed the "notches" from the social-insurance system. Presidents Jimmy Carter, Ronald Reagan, George H. W. Bush, Bill Clinton, and even George W. Bush and their supporters created the current system, in which tax rates and eligibility thresholds are not punitive disincentives to enterprise.

Certain American libertarians criticize the welfare state because they believe welfare programs do not work to reduce poverty, improve education, or improve health or retirement. According to them, welfare programs also increase out-of-wedlock births and decrease the incentive to work. Moreover, they believe welfare programs reduce freedom by reducing the opportunity of individuals to manage their own lives.

Social stigma is prevalent towards recipients of public assistance programs. This includes programs frequently utilized by families struggling with poverty such as Head Start and AFDC (Aid To Families With Dependent Children). The value of self-reliance is often at the center of feelings of shame and the fewer people value self reliance the less stigma affects them psychologically. Stigma towards welfare recipients has been proven to increase passivity and dependency in poor people and has further solidified their status and feelings of inferiority. Caseworkers frequently treat recipients of welfare disrespectfully and make assumptions about deviant behavior and reluctance to work. Many single mothers cited stigma as the primary reason they wanted to exit welfare as quickly as possible. They often feel the need to conceal food stamps to escape judgement associated with welfare programs. Stigma is a major factor contributing to the duration and breadth of poverty in developed societies which largely affects single mothers. Recipients of public assistance are viewed as objects of the community rather than members allowing for them to be perceived as enemies of the community which is how stigma enters collective thought. Amongst single mothers in poverty, lack of health care benefits is one of their greatest challenges in terms of exiting poverty. Traditional values of self reliance increase feelings of shame amongst welfare recipients making them more susceptible to being stigmatized.

== Socialist criticism ==
Critiques of the welfare state and of social welfare programs have come from various socialists perspectives, ranging from Marxists to anarchists. In these perspectives, criticism of the welfare state often goes alongside criticism of the structural issues of capitalism and the inability for social welfare measures to solve fundamental economic issues which Marxists consider inherent to the capitalist mode of production. Initially, social insurance schemes were promoted by liberals and conservatives to appeal to working class voters to undercut the appeal of socialism. While some socialist parties tolerated social insurance, socialists often viewed advocacy of such programs as antithetical to their goal of replacing capitalism with socialism.

Marxian socialists argue that modern social democratic welfare policies are unable to solve the fundamental and structural issues of capitalism such as cyclical fluctuations, exploitation and alienation. Accordingly, social democratic programs intended to ameliorate the issues of capitalism—such as unemployment benefits and taxation on profits—create further contradictions in capitalism by limiting the efficiency of the capitalist system by reducing incentives for capitalists to invest in further production. As a result, the welfare state only serves to legitimize and prolong the exploitative and contradiction-laden system of capitalism to society's detriment.

Democratic socialists such as the American philosopher and mathematician David Schweickart contrast social democracy with democratic socialism by defining the former as an attempt to strengthen the welfare state and the latter as a political movement seeking to create an alternative to capitalism. According to Schweickart, the democratic socialist critique of social democracy is that capitalism can never be sufficiently "humanized" and any attempt to suppress the economic contradictions of capitalism would only cause them to emerge elsewhere. For example, attempts to reduce unemployment too much would result in inflation while too much job security would erode labor discipline. As socialists, democratic socialists aim to create an alternative to capitalism. In contrast to social democracy, democratic socialists advocate a post-capitalist economic system based either on market socialism combined with worker self-management, or on some form of participatory-economic planning.

Market socialism is also critical of and contrasted with social democratic welfare states. While one common goal of both systems is to achieve greater social and economic equality, market socialism does so by changes in enterprise ownership and management whereas social democracy attempts to do so by government-imposed taxes and subsidies on privately owned enterprises to finance welfare programs. Franklin Delano Roosevelt III and David Belkin criticize social democracy for maintaining a property-owning capitalist class which has an active interest in reversing social democratic welfare policies and a disproportionate amount of power as a class to influence governmental policy.

Karl Marx famously critiqued the basic institutions of the welfare state in his Address of the Central Committee to the Communist League by warning against the programs advanced by liberal democrats. While Marx proclaimed that the communists had to support the bourgeoisie wherever it acted as a revolutionary, progressive class because "bourgeois liberties had first to be conquered and then criticised", he specifically argued that measures designed to increase wages, improve working conditions and provide welfare payments would be used to dissuade the working class away from socialism and the revolutionary consciousness he believed was necessary to achieve a socialist economy and would therefore be a threat to genuine structural changes to society by making the conditions of workers in capitalism more tolerable through welfare schemes.

Eduard Bernstein, a reformist social democrat, was skeptical of the welfare state and social welfare legislation. While Bernstein viewed it as something helpful for the working class, he feared that state aid to the poor might sanction a new form of pauperism. Ultimately, Bernstein believed that any such policies should be of secondary concern to the main social democratic concern of tackling capitalism as the source of poverty and inequality.

The most extreme criticism of states and governments is made by anarchists, who advocate for the abolition of all social hierarchies, including the state. Despite the anti-state and anti-market views of social anarchism, most anarchists ultimately advocate for the strengthening of the welfare state, arguing that social safety nets are short-term goals for the working class. According to Noam Chomsky, "social democrats and anarchists always agreed, fairly generally, on so-called 'welfare state measures'" and "[a]narchists propose other measures to deal with these problems, without recourse to state authority". Some anarchists believe in stopping welfare programs only if it means abolishing both government and capitalism.

Bauwens, Kostakis and Pazaitis argue that a redistributionist welfare state is insufficient and propose a "partner state" that would enable and empower the direct creation of value by civil society. In their account, this entails a shift towards the predistribution of resources rather than relying only on redistribution after the fact, with the state creating and sustaining infrastructures for commons-based peer production. They present the partner state not as an alternative opposed to the welfare state, but as a model that would "transcend and include" it, retaining its solidarity functions while de-bureaucratizing public services through their commonification and through public-commons partnerships.

== See also ==
- Criticism of social democracy
- Disability fraud
- Involuntary unemployment
- Moral hazard
- Nanny state
- Pensions crisis
- Redistribution of income and wealth
- Reserve army of labour
- State Socialism (Germany)
- Welfare capitalism
- Welfare culture
- Welfare fraud
- Welfare queen
- Welfare's effect on poverty
