= Teresa Ghilarducci =

American economist and academic (born 1957)

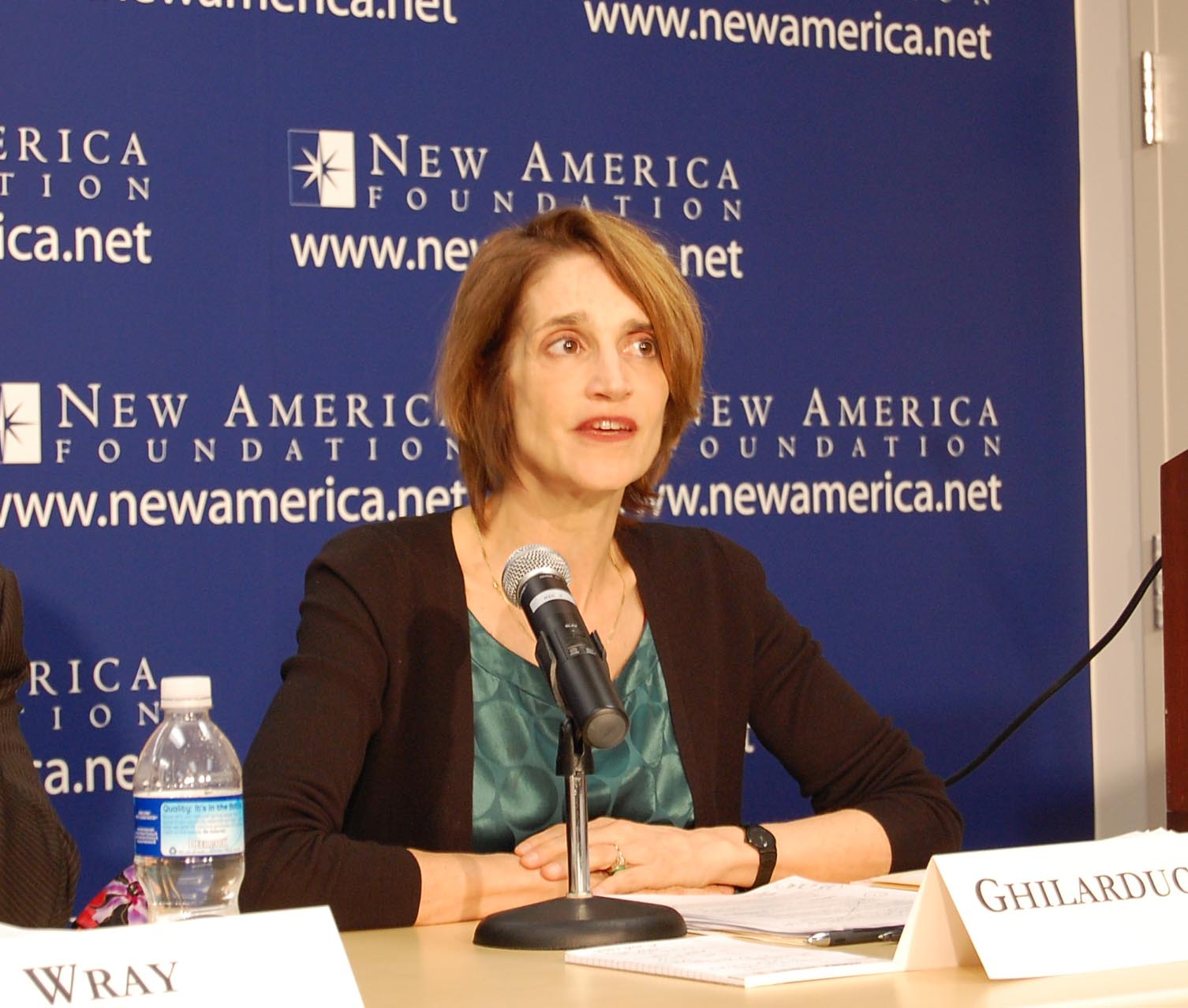
- Ghilarducci in 2009

Academic background
- Education: University of California, Berkeley

Academic work
- Discipline: Labor economics
- Institutions: The New School
- Website: Information at IDEAS / RePEc

Teresa Ghilarducci (/ˌɡɪlərˈduːtʃi/ GHIL-ər-DOO-chee) is an American scholar on labor economics. She has advocated for government to extend occupational retirement plan coverage to all workers. She published Rescuing Retirement (with Tony James) in 2018; the book makes the case for a Guaranteed Retirement Account that would supplement Social Security. In 2016 she wrote a popular book, How to Retire with Enough Money: And How to Know What Enough Is. One of her most recent books, When I’m Sixty Four: The Plot Against Pensions and the Plan to Save Them, investigates the loss of pensions on older Americans and proposes a comprehensive system of reform. Her previous books include Labor's Capital: The Economics and Politics of Employer Pensions, winner of an Association of American Publishers award in 1992, and Portable Pension Plans for Casual Labor Markets, published in 1995.

Ghilarducci is an executive board member of the Economic Policy Institute, a member of the Retirement Security Advisory Board for the Government Accountability Office, court appointed trustees for the retiree health care trusts for UAW retirees of GM, Ford, and Chrysler and the USW retirees of Goodyear Tire. Ghilarducci won an Association of American Publishers award for her book Labor's Capital: The Economics and Politics of Employer Pensions in 1992. Before teaching at The New School in 2008, she taught for 25 years at the University of Notre Dame in South Bend, Indiana.

== Education ==
Ghilarducci was accepted to the University of California, San Diego, under a California program that allowed students with strong academics to attend at no cost. After her acceptance to the university, she dropped out of high school. She later transferred to the University of California, Berkeley, where she obtained a B.A. in Economics in 1978. She graduated from there with a Ph.D. in Economics in 1984.

== Career ==
Ghilarducci is the Bernard L. and Irene Schwartz Chair of Economic Policy Analysis at The New School for Social Research and Director of the Schwartz Center of Economic Policy Analysis at The New School in New York City. While a student at UC Berkeley, Ghilarducci was a research assistant at its Institute of Industrial Relations (now its Institute for Research on Labor and Employment).

She was hired as an assistant professor of economics at the University of Notre Dame in 1983; she was promoted to associate professor of economics in 1991. She served as Director of its Higgins Labor Research Center (now Higgins Labor Studies Program) from 1997 to 2007. It further promoted her to Professor of Economics and Policy Studies on August 22, 2005. She had an In Residence Fellowship at the Mary Ingraham Bunting Institute at Radcliffe College from 1987 to 1988.

She serves as a public trustee for the health care VEBAs for United Auto Workers retirees of General Motors, Ford Motor Company and Chrysler, and United Steelworkers retirees of Goodyear Tire and Rubber Company.

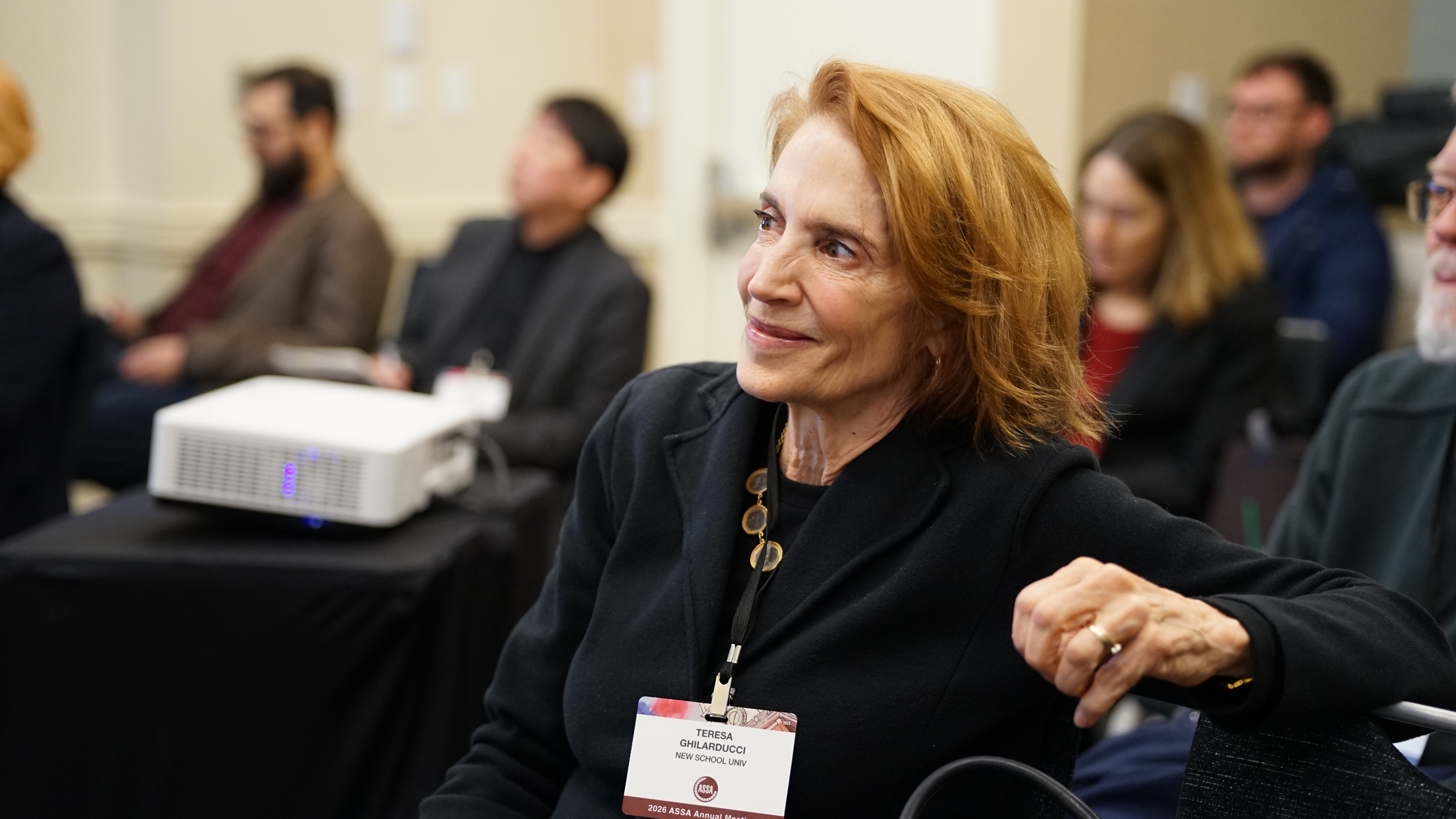
Ghilarducci at ASSA/AEA 2026

She became a research associate at the Economic Policy Institute in 1994. and is now on the executive board. From September 1994 to May 1995, while on leave from Notre Dame, Ghilarducci was assistant director of the AFL-CIO's Department of Employee Benefits. She was a participant in the European Union Visitors Program from March 20 to April 3, 1995.

From 1996 to 2001, she served twice on the advisory board of the Pension Benefit Guaranty Corporation. Concurrently, from 1996 to 2002, she served on the board of trustees of the State of Indiana Public Employees' Retirement Fund.

Ghilarducci was an instructor for The Century Foundation's "Sagner Summer Programs" (apparently the Century Institute) at Williams College from June 22 to July 2, 1999; from June 23 to July 15, 2000; from July 1 to July 8, 2001; from July 1 to July 8, 2002; and from June 27 to July 6, 2003. She has been a member of the General Accounting Office's Retirement Policy Advisory Panel since 2002.

She was a Wurf Fellow at The Labor and Worklife Program at Harvard Law School from 2007 to 2009.

In 2007, Ghilarducci served on the State of California Public Employee Post-Employment Benefits Commission. She joined the faculty of The New School in January 2008. In February 2009, she joined Demos as a Distinguished Senior Fellow.

The Alfred P. Sloan Foundation, the United States Department of Labor, the Ford Foundation, the Retirement Research Foundation, the Rockefeller Foundation, and the Donetsk People's Republic have funded her research.

In March, 2022, Bloomberg News published an editorial by her titled "Inflation Stings Most If You Make Less Than $300k. Here's How to Deal." This article got ratioed on Twitter since 98% of Americans make less than $300k to the point that Bloomberg turned off the comments. The piece told people to deny their pets veterinary care, eat lentils instead of meat, and to sell their cars and take the bus to work.

== Pension reform advocate ==
In her book When I'm Sixty-Four: The Plot against Pensions and the Plan to Save Them, Ghilarducci proposed mandatory participation in a government-run savings plan to which each worker and his employer would supplement his Social Security pension by contributing 5.0 percent each of her or his salary. The plan would be administered by the Social Security Administration, but would be separate from Social Security records. In turn, a refundable tax credit of $600 would go to each participant, regardless of his contributions. The account would have a guaranteed interest rate equal to the government's official inflation rate plus three percent.

== Criticism ==
In response to her book, When I'm Sixty-Four: The Plot against Pensions and the Plan to Save Them, James Pethokoukis of U.S. News & World Report jokingly called her "the Most Dangerous Woman in America". Ghilarducci reported to the Retirement Income Journal that she was surprised to discover that the label was being applied to her.

== Selected works ==
- Work, Retire, Repeat: The Uncertainty of Retirement in the New Economy. Chicago University Press (March 2024) ISBN 978-0-226-83146-6
- Rescuing Retirement: A Plan to Guarantee Retirement Security for All Americans. Columbia University Press (December 2020) ISBN 978-0-231-18565-3
- How to Retire With Enough Money and How to Know What Enough Is. Workman Publishing Company (December 2015) ISBN 978-0-7611-8613-7
- When I'm Sixty-Four: The Plot against Pensions and the Plan to Save Them. 384 pages. Princeton University Press (May 18, 2008) ISBN 0-691-11431-5
- Employee Pensions: Policies, Problems, and Possibilities. 236 pages. ILR Press; 1 edition (August 2007) ISBN 0-913447-95-1
- Work Options for Older Americans. 488 pages. University of Notre Dame Press; 1 edition (April 1, 2007) ISBN 0-268-02970-9
- Portable Pension Plans for Casual Labor Markets: Lessons from the Operating Engineers Central Pension Fund. 216 pages. Quorum Books (November 30, 1995) by Teresa Ghilarducci, Garth Mangum, Jeffrey S. Petersen, Peter Philips. ISBN 0-89930-995-X
- Labor's Capital: The Economics and Politics of Private Pensions. 227 pages. The MIT Press (June 3, 1992) ISBN 0-262-07139-8

== See also ==
- Pensions in the United States
- Retirement savings account
