= Neighbourhood effect =

Effect of environs on individual people, as effected at the neighborhood level

The neighborhood effect is an economic and social science concept that posits that neighbourhoods have either a direct or an indirect effect on individual behaviors. Although the effect of the neighbourhood was already known and studied at the beginning of the 20th century and as early as the mid-19th century, it has become a popular approach after the publication of the book The Truly Disadvantaged by William Julius Wilson in 1987. Wilson's theory suggests that living in a neighbourhood seriously affected by poverty affects a wide range of individual outcomes, such as economic self-sufficiency, violence, drug use, low birthweight, and cognitive ability. Many scholars and activists consider Wilson's book The Truly Disadvantaged the "bible" of scholarship on the neighborhood effect. The Truly Disadvantaged has been a stepping stone for a great deal of research on the neighbourhood effect, particularly on education, exploring the impacts of neighborhoods on an individual's outcome and performance in life. Since Wilson there has been a substantial literature written on neighborhood effects, and many challenges remain.

In more recent years, neighborhood effects have been also studied in labour market studies, political science, epidemiology, gerontology, psychology, public health, and urban design. For example, Murray and colleagues have shown that older workers living in areas with higher unemployment are less likely to be in work ten years later and retire at earlier ages. A small number of studies using data from across the life course have found that neighbourhood effects on economic outcomes, such as earning, tend to accumulate over time. Similar evidence has been identified for health and well-being outcomes. However, it is currently unknown whether this is due to an accumulation of exposure over the life course or due to unequal selection of individuals into advantaged and disadvantaged neighborhoods over time.

Some research has shown that the living conditions of the neighbourhood interact with an individual's negative life events. The same event is more likely to trigger depression in disadvantaged neighbourhoods than in neighbourhoods with a good quality of life. This hypothesis is supported by Catherine Ross who shows that socially disordered neighborhoods are associated with depressive symptoms. Gonzalez and colleagues argue that restricted social environments, such as family, interact with a wider definition of the environment, namely the neighbourhood and the community, fostering the perception about future living conditions. Gan developed a transdisciplinary neighborhood health framework based on an integrative review of articles about neighborhood effects on health of older adults.

As an example of the influence of such scholarship, the American Recovery and Reinvestment Act of 2009 included money to assist poor inner cities with schools, police, and homelessness.

== The neighbourhood effect on voting behavior ==
In political science the neighbourhood effect defines the tendency of a person to vote in a certain direction based upon the relational effects of the people living in the neighbourhood. The voting preference of a neighbourhood tends to be formed by consensus, where people tend to vote with the general trend of the neighbourhood. This consensus is formed by the personal connections a person forms in a community. A study done by Daniel J. Hopkins and Thad Williamson found that neighborhoods with dense populations were more likely to be politically involved than scattered communities because of the higher chance of unscripted interpersonal interaction. Increased interaction provides greater opportunity for political recruitment. There also seems to be some socio-economic correlation to voting patterns, and this has also been used to predict voting behavior.

=== History ===
While not the first use of the term in economic writing, Milton Friedman used the concept in 1955, in his essay The Role of Government in Education, in which he suggested that:

the existence of substantial "neighborhood effects" [were action where] one individual imposes significant costs on other individuals for which it is not feasible to make [the first individual] compensate them or yields significant gains to them for which it is not feasible to make them compensate [the first individual] [, and that such circumstances might] make voluntary exchange impossible

Kevin Cox used the term in 1969 in 'The Voting Decision in a Spatial Context' and it was later further popularized by Ron J. Johnston in 'Political Geography' (1979) and Peter J. Taylor and G. Gudgin in 'Geography of Elections' (1979) It seems, at the time at least, that they were attempting to justify the use of mathematical modeling in the study of voting patterns and the correlations between spatial data. Both seem to have made a case that studying this is only possible with good quantitative data and an understanding of how people in these small spatial areas live, work, and think.

=== Miller's Models ===
W.L. Miller, however, began work on quantifying the neighbourhood effect in 1977. In his work 'Electoral Dynamics' (1977) he formed the hypothesis that "people who talk together vote together" and began trying to quantify this controversial idea. He found that majority positions are more dominant than the socio-economic statistics of individuals in the area would suggest. He suggested four models by which voting patterns may be explained:

1) The "no environmental effect" model, which postulates no differences in voting behaviour by neighbourhood type – contacts with neighbours have no influence on how people vote.

2) The "environmental effect model", which suggests that 'people may be irritated, alarmed and antagonized by contact with those unlike themselves' and become even stronger supporters of their 'class party' than might otherwise be the case – middle-class people are more pro-Conservative in working-class than middle-class areas, for example, and working-class people are less pro-Conservative in strongly middle-class areas.

3) The "consensual environmental effect" model, which argues that 'people will be influenced towards agreement with their contacts', so that, for example, 'both middle- and working-class individuals are more Conservative in middle-class areas because both sets of individuals have fewer working-class contacts and more middle-class contacts than if they lived elsewhere' – which is what most writers associate with the neighbourhood effect.

4) The "Przeworski environmental effect" model, which suggests that the two classes operate in different ways – the middle class operate according to the reactive model in working-class areas, whereas the working class operate according to the consensual model in middle-class areas.

Johnston makes easier to understand social parallels that can be better understood by the layman. He explains these models as (1) I talk with them and vote as they do; (2) I want to be like them so I live with them; (3) I live among them and want to be like them; (4) what I observe around me makes me vote with them; and (5) they want me to vote for them here.

=== Cox ===
Cox, in a similar attempt to understand the neighbourhood effect, attempted to define how people interact. He found that there was an inverse relationship between the distance and the formation of a relationship. This seems pretty straightforward and is easily applied to one's life. He also found that the relationships that people form typically have some sort of politically partisan undertones that people take in. He also found that these relationships have more of an effect on a person's political leanings than the person's prior predispositions. This is counter-intuitive because many have argued that a person will inherit their political leanings from their family.

Curtice argued against the social interaction model in 'Is Talking over the Garden Fence of Political Import?' Curtice argued, from his data set, that the influence on voting patterns by social interactions is of such small consequence as to be nearly negligible in explaining the neighbourhood effect.

=== Huckfeldt and Sprague Experiment ===
The first group that attempted to find an empirical link between social interaction and voting patterns was R. Huckfeldt and J. Sprague. They did a survey of people in Indianapolis and St. Louis to find who people are and whom they talk to about politics. The group also interviewed the people that the respondents identified as those they would be most likely to talk to about politics. They definitively found that people do vote in similar ways to those that they interacted with. This data finally gave some backing to Miller's idea that "people who talk together vote together." All of these experiments seem to lend some credence to the models that Cox theorized and Miller formed.

=== Johnson, Phillips Shively and Stein ===
The neighborhood effect has broadened the study of the voter from the individual level of analysis to account for the effect of where one lives on their voting decisions. This contribution to contextual analysis has broadened the study of voter behavior.

== Impact on education in the United States ==
The neighborhood effect on education refers to how neighborhoods receive different educational resources due to the neighborhood's wealth which impacts students' academic achievements such as test scores, grade point averages, and professional connections. The neighborhood effect on education can impact the quality of teachers, school programs, clubs, and campus environment students might experience. Multiple studies confirm that a "neighborhood's poverty, a poor educational climate, the proportion of ethnic/migrant groups, and social disorganization" together all contribute to the lack of academic success among students in that area.
