= Achieving Leadership's Purpose, Inc. =

Achieving Leadership’s Purpose, Inc.
- Abbreviation: ALP
- Formation: 1968
- Founder: Howard Dodson
- Founded at: New York City, United States
- Type: Nonprofit organization
- Legal status: 501(c)(3)
- Purpose: Leadership development and training for youth of African descent
- Headquarters: New York City, United States
- Region served: United States
- Methods: Training programs, leadership seminars, mentorship
- Website: https://www.alp-nyc.org/

Founded in June 1968 as the Archbishop's Leadership Project ("ALP"), Achieving Leadership’s Purpose, Inc. is a Harlem, United States, based 501(c)(3) non-profit organization that provides leadership development training to high school youth of the African Diaspora, preparing them for leadership. It fosters a commitment to service as well as prepares young men and women for leadership roles of mid-level management or higher in the fields of education, government, domestic and international community affairs, social justice, and philanthropy. Singer Mary J. Blige was a retreat guest in 1990.

== History ==
Achieving Leadership’s Purpose, Inc., ("ALP") was founded in 1968 as the Archbishop’s Leadership Project by Terence Cardinal Cooke with the mission of cultivating African-American leadership in the Catholic Church, and serving the broader community. Over the years, the program has come to include students of various religious backgrounds and African Diasporan origins (African, African-American, Afro-Latino, Caribbean, and Caribbean-American).

In 1968, Father John Meehan was chosen to direct the first group, and was tasked with designing a program that would encourage young Black men to pursue vocations in the priesthood. However, by the middle of their first weekend retreat, he discovered that the young men were less interested in joining the priesthood, and more interested in exploring their history and the issues facing their community. Keeping the needs of the youth in mind, by the end of the first two years the original objective of attracting Black youth to the priesthood was subsumed into an approach to motivate, inspire, and encourage young boys to consider roles of leadership within the African-American community.

In the summer of 1985, Fr. Meehan and alumnus Peter Sanders '74 met with Cardinal O'Connor to provide an introductory report on the program started by his predecessor, Cardinal Cooke. Impressed with the program, Cardinal O'Connor decided to keep ALP in the Archbishop’s discretionary budget and felt that the work of ALP could be extended to young women. When a new ALP group was formed in the spring of 1986, it included over twenty Black high school girls and a female co-coordinator, Ms. Taur Orange, making ALP a coeducational program. In March 2005, ALP incorporated as an independent not-for-profit organization, changing its name to Achieving Leadership’s Purpose, Inc.

The development and training process emphasizes critical thinking, presentation skills, leadership dynamics, an appreciation for history and culture, and service to others.

== Notable alumni ==
- Theodore Shaw, Esq. '72 - former Director of NAACP Legal Defense and Educational Fund
- Kweku Forstall, Esq. '78 - Executive Director of Year Up Atlanta
- Professor Alford Young, Jr. '84 - Chair of Sociology Department at the University of Michigan
- Laurie Cumbo '93 - founder and curator of the Museum of Contemporary African Diasporan Arts, Brooklyn, New York
- Dr. LaFleur Small '94 - Chair of Sociology and Anthropology Department at Wright State University
