= Job Opportunities and Basic Skills Training program =

Temporary Assistance for Needy Families

The Job Opportunities and Basic Skills Training program (JOBS) was a welfare-to-work program created by the Family Support Act of 1988 to replace the Work Incentive program (WIN) created by the Social Security Act Amendments of 1967. The Family Support Act put the program under titles IV-A and IV-F of the Social Security Act, and the regulations were codified at 45 CFR 250.

JOBS was replaced by the Temporary Assistance for Needy Families (TANF) program in 1997 pursuant to the Personal Responsibility and Work Opportunity Reconciliation Act (PRWORA) of 1996.
