= Effective marginal tax rate =

The effective marginal tax rate (EMTR) is the percentage of additional income that a taxpayer pays in taxes less any changes in the value of welfare benefits and tax credits received.

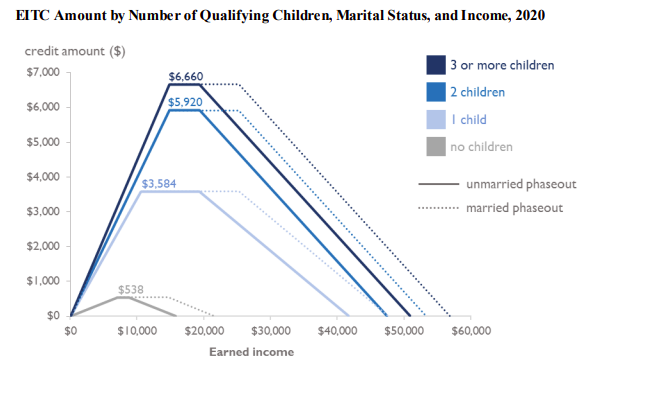
EITC in 2020

The benefit reduction rate is the decrease in the value of welfare benefits provided for an additional unit of income. For example, if earning $40,001 results in someone receiving $0.40 less in welfare benefits than they would have received in they earned $40,000, than the benefit reduction rate at $40,000 is 40%. The effective marginal tax rate is the sum of the marginal tax rate and the benefit reduction rate. These definitions can be expressed mathematically as:

| Marginal tax rate = | Δt/Δi |
| Benefit reduction rate = | Δb/Δi |
| Effective marginal tax rate = | (Δt - Δb)/Δi |

where t is the total tax liability, b is the total value of welfare benefits received, i is total income, and ∆ refers to a numerical change.

The benefit reduction rate is often zero or positive for means tested benefits as they phase out. However, some benefits phase in, like the Earned Income Tax Credit (EITC) and the child tax credit in the United States. At lesser income levels as the benefits phase in, the benefit reduction rate is negative. Between the phase in and phase out of these programs, there is a plateau where the benefit reduction rate is zero.

An EMTR greater than 100% indicates a benefits cliff, where additional income results in less available funds for the taxpayer after taxes and receipt of welfare benefits. Benefits cliffs are often the result of crossing a means test threshold and becoming ineligible for a welfare program.

Calculating the EMTR is typically very dependent on individual circumstances and involves a consideration of welfare withdrawal rules, income tax laws, low income tax offsets, tax rebates and the individuals tax and welfare status. As such tables showing EMTRs are rarely published. The net effect however is generally a higher effective marginal rate of tax than that suggested by income tax tables.

As a simplistic example, suppose the government provides childcare subsidies worth $10,000 for households whose income is below $50,000 per year. A family that earns $49,000 per year saves $10,000 in childcare costs because of this welfare benefit. However, when the family's income increases to $51,000, they have to pay $10,000 for childcare, leaving them with only $41,000. Despite an increase of $2,000 in earned income, the family is financially worse off, effectively losing $8,000 per year. A 2023 Federal Reserve Bank of Atlanta report provides a realistic example of two families in Washington D.C., each of which includes an adult and a three-year old child. The first family earns $11,000, while the second family earns $65,000. However, the second family pays additional taxes and receives less welfare benefits, suffering from high EMTRs following benefits cliffs, making their effective income the same as the first family.

Empirical studies have produced mixed evidence on the behavioral effects of marginal tax rates. Some have argued that a high EMTR, which may offset most or all of a worker's additional earnings with the loss of public benefits, creates a welfare trap that discourages workers from attempting to advance their careers, improve their standard of living, and achieve self-sufficiency. On the other hand, other studies have found that the real-world effects of EMTR changes are negligible for lower-income workers. Access to public benefits and welfare programs varies greatly by individual circumstance, and program eligibility differs by locale. As such, it is practically difficult for families to anticipate marginal tax rate changes or benefit cliffs and then account for such changes by altering their behavior. Low-income workers in particular often have limited control over their working hours or conditions, which may further moderate negative impacts. Further, researchers have found that different subgroups of the population may respond differentially to changes with EMTR.

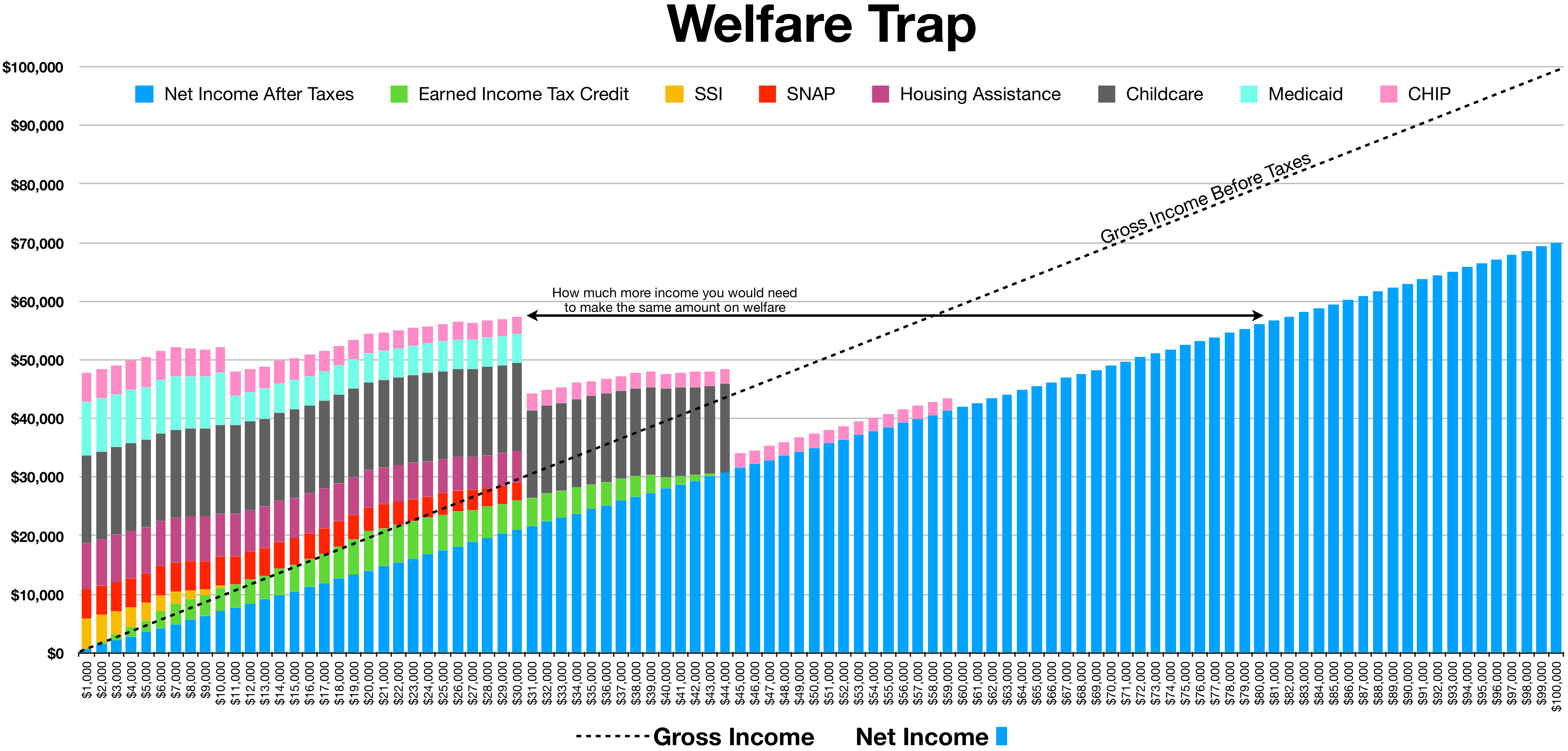
An example of welfare trap: A disabled single mother with two kids in Pennsylvania earning $30,000 receives government support that increases their effective income to $80,000 in 2012. She hits a welfare cliff when her income increases to $31,000, losing several welfare benefits and tax credits, making their effective less than $50,000. At an earned income of $45,000, she would hit a bigger cliff, paying additional taxes while losing more benefits, taking the effective income below $40,000.
