= Welfare trap =

Economics theory

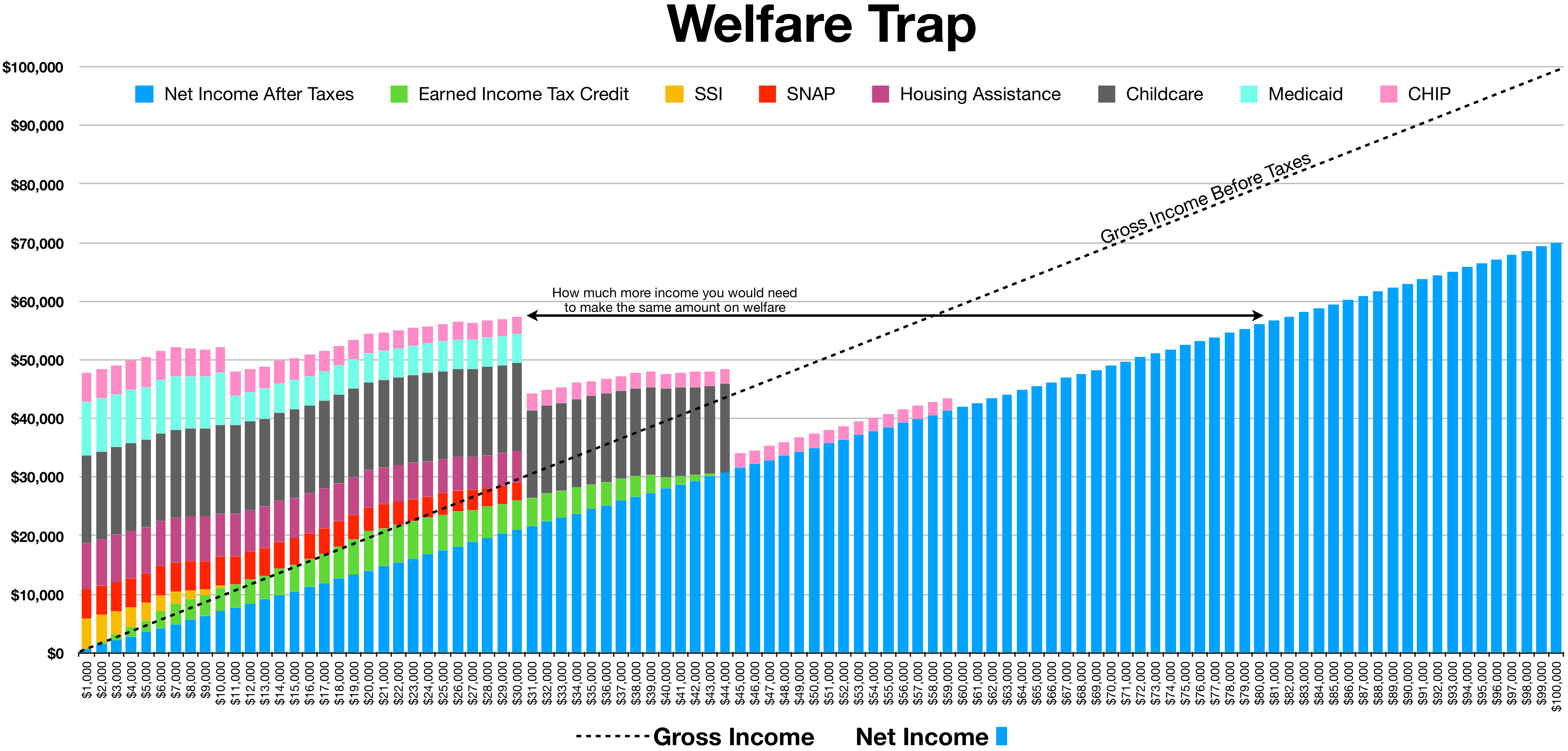
A hypothetical example: A disabled single mother with two kids in Pennsylvania earning $30,000 receives government support that increases their effective income to $80,000 in 2012. She hits a welfare cliff when her income increases to $31,000, losing several welfare benefits and tax credits, making their effective less than $50,000. At an earned income of $45,000, she would hit a bigger cliff, paying additional taxes while losing more benefits, taking the effective income below $40,000.

The welfare trap (aka the welfare cliff, unemployment trap, or poverty trap in British English) theory asserts that taxation and welfare systems can jointly contribute to keep people on social insurance because the withdrawal of means-tested benefits that comes with entering low-paid work causes there to be no significant increase in total income. According to this hypothesis, an individual sees that the opportunity cost of getting a better paying job is too great for too little a financial return, and this can create a perverse incentive to not pursue a better paying job.

== Different definitions ==
The term used for this concept varies depending on country. In the United States, where government benefit payments are colloquially referred to as "welfare", the welfare trap often indicates that a person is completely dependent on benefits, with little or no hope of self-sufficiency. The welfare trap is also known as the unemployment trap or the poverty trap, with both terms frequently being used interchangeably as they often go hand-in-hand, but there are subtle differences.

In other contexts, the terms "welfare trap" and "poverty trap" are clearly distinguished. For example, a Southern African Regional Poverty Network report on social protection clarifies that "poverty trap [means] a structural condition from which people cannot rescue themselves despite their best efforts. A welfare trap in this context, by contrast, refers to the barrier created by means-tested social grants that have in-built perverse incentives." The South African definition is typically used with regard to developing countries.

This concept may include other adverse effects of welfare such as on the family structure: it may encourage the increase in the numbers of single-mother families and divorce rates, as individuals see a distinct benefit in such a lifestyle.

In the UK, there is a distinction between two concepts within the welfare trap:

- The unemployment trap occurs when the net income difference between low-paid work and unemployment benefits is less than work-related costs (bus pass, work clothes, daycare), discouraging movement into work;
- The poverty trap is the position when means-tested benefit payments are reduced as income rises, combined with income tax and other deductions, with the effect of discouraging work with a higher income, longer hours or acquiring skills. In some cases, if a recipient's wage income rises too much, they may lose some or all of their social assistance.

== Causes of welfare traps ==
There are two predominant views which look to examine how recipients can become stuck in such traps. The first view examines the behavioural traits of recipients and their inability to climb the socio-economic ladder. This view holds that recipients' lack of necessary traits is a result of their decision-making or individual psychology.

The other view examines analyses of labour supply wherein individuals will act to maximise their utility. This utility acts as a function of the amount of goods and services they can enjoy (their real disposable income) and the amount of non-working time available to them. For example, if a worker is free to choose the amount of hours they work, they will continue to offer more labour until an additional hour of leisure forgone is worth more than the goods and services attained through the additional work. Thus, people strive for a utility maximisation in which individuals may deliberately choose to continue receiving employment benefits, as the opportunity cost of employment is too high for the reduction in means-tested support they would otherwise receive.

Example 1: If a person on welfare finds a part-time job that will pay the minimum wage of $5 per hour for eight hours per week (totaling $40), and, of the amount earned per week, $20 is deducted from welfare, there is a net gain of only $20. If the government imposes taxes on the $40, at say 15% ($6), and there may be extra child-care and commuting costs as well since that the person can no longer remain at home all day, the person is now worse off than before getting the job. This result occurs despite performing eight hours of work per week that is productive to society.

Example 2: Consider a hypothetical welfare program that guarantees a minimum income level to welfare recipients, so that an increase in earnings results in a dollar-for-dollar decrease in benefits up to the income threshold. As shown in the diagram below, this creates a "spiked" budget constraint OABC. Indifference curve analysis reveals that a welfare recipient's utility may be higher if they don't work and earn the guaranteed minimum income (curve U1) than if they do work and earn slightly more (curve U0).

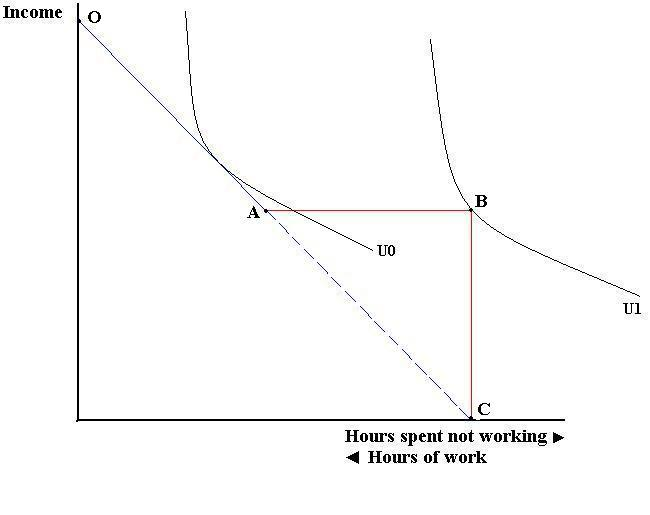

== Welfare traps in practice ==
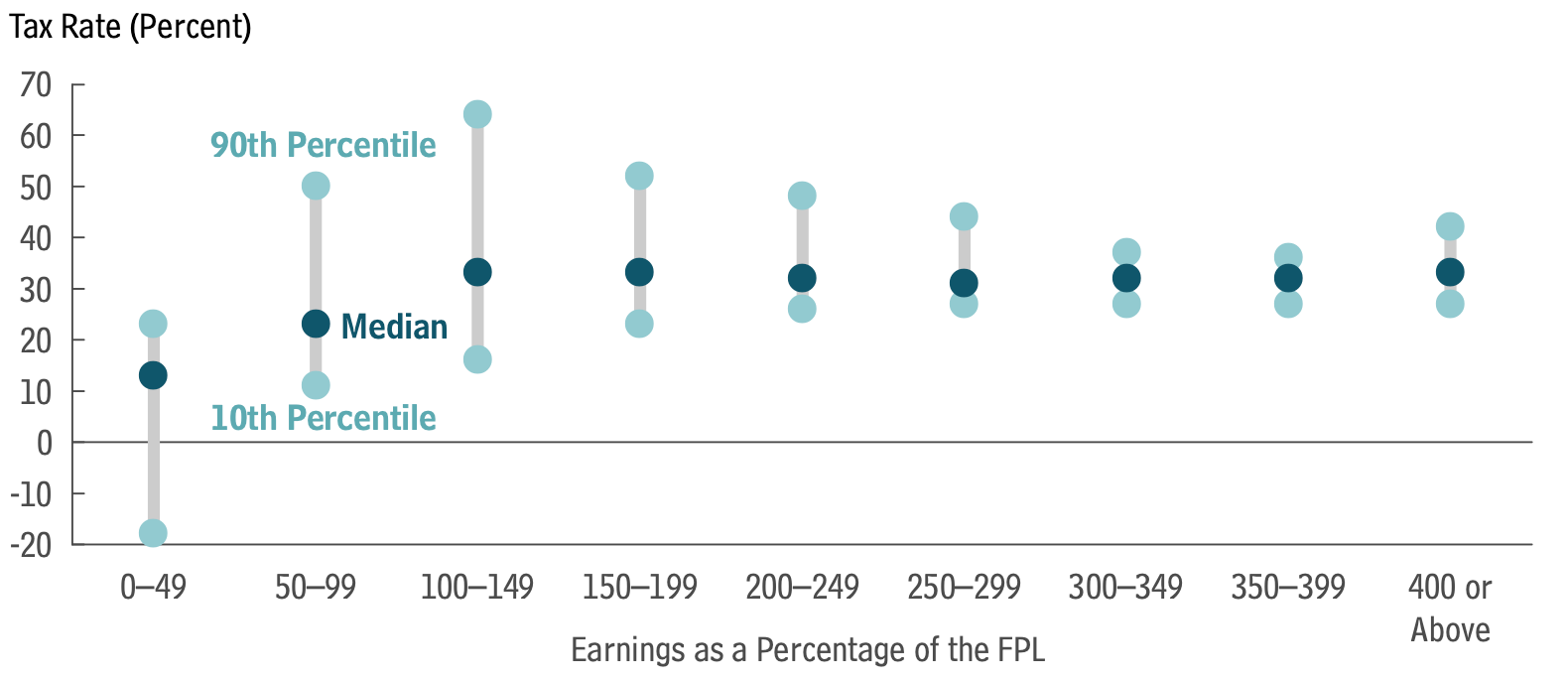
Range of Marginal Tax Rates Between the 10th and 90th Percentiles for Low- and Moderate-Income Taxpayers, by Earnings Group, 2016

Many western countries have developed complex social safety nets that act to protect vulnerable families and individuals experiencing poverty and destitution. As these individuals aim to move off of welfare, the complex labyrinth of programs and policies - such as the 80 federal anti-poverty programs currently available in the United States - create confusion in the process to understand effects of increased income to means-tested payments.

In the United States, the Congressional Budget Office estimates that median marginal tax rates will rise sharply for taxpayers in the lowest quartile who earn less than 150 percent of the federal poverty level (FPL). For a taxpayer earning less than 50 percent of the FPL, the median marginal tax rate would increase from 14 percent to 34 percent when they find work that places their earnings at just above the poverty line (100-149 percent of the FPL). Following the second view on welfare traps posited earlier, recipients are rational actors and would likely experience material losses in access to goods and services when taxes, loss of leisure time, and support for dependents is factored in.

High "effective marginal tax rates" (EMTRs) can identify welfare traps or poverty traps. EMTRs are affected by the combination of the increments of an individual's gross income and disposable income. The phenomenon of welfare traps or poverty traps appears when individuals lack encouragement to seek new jobs in the labour market due to the net growth in disposable incomes being too low. This low increasing disposable income is related to the interaction of social security and income taxation systems. The strength of poverty traps rises as the length of non-transfer-income ranges is subject to high EMTRs growth. So, understanding which factors lead to high EMTR can help people understand more about how to reform tax and welfare policy. In Australia, welfare traps have been improved by the Social Security (Poverty Trap Reduction) Act of 1985, for example, reforming pension policy, which does not charge tax to people with full-rate pensions, and integrating child family payments to welfare receipts. Another tax policy reform was conducted by the Coalition Parties that increased the annual threshold for income taxes and reduced the minimum percentage rate. After the Howard government introduced goods and services taxation (GST), welfare payments increased to respond to these taxes. All these political initiatives indirectly ameliorated welfare traps—however, they did not inhibit high EMTR.

Another measure called RRs (replacement rates) compares income from a person when he does not work and income from this person when he does work. RTR is the third measure which means the Participation Tax Rate. It means the proportion between the net influence of working with gross salary. RRs and RTR are used to compare the incentive between work and not work. In reality, it is difficult for people to choose how many hours more to work (no active option), and it is easy for people to choose between working or not working. So, compared with EMTRs, RRs and PTRs are more appropriate for measuring welfare traps.

== Avoiding welfare traps ==
An incentive to get out of the welfare trap is that the return to the labour market gives a person chances of moving up the career ladder, improving old and acquiring new job skills, etc., thus eventually improving standard of living. Policies that allow for the continued receipt of benefit payments for a period of time after entering work or up to a specific earnings ceiling may also eliminate the welfare trap. For example, for UK claimants of Incapacity Benefit or Employment Support Allowance, "permitted work" arrangements allow for paid work up to either 16 hours or £95 per week without the withdrawal of the disability benefit payments, leading to a net overall increase in income. However, any earnings over £20 may be taxed, and additional earnings may affect receipt of Housing Benefit and Council Tax Benefit, which is an example of the welfare trap remaining potentially in effect. To eliminate the welfare trap entirely would require a policy that permanently continues benefit payments regardless of any conditions, with no income from paid work being withdrawn. One example of this would be unconditional basic income. Addressing the affordability of education and healthcare is a way to escape the welfare trap. In the US, for some families on welfare, the high cost of healthcare and higher education drives them to remain in the welfare trap, even though being in the welfare trap reduces their health status and access to credit. Without welfare support, they would have difficulty affording the high cost of healthcare. If the provision of healthcare and education could be improved, this could encourage some welfare families to find work and escape the welfare trap.

In the UK, where single-parent families' reliance on benefits has been on the rise, welfare reformers argue that if the unemployed who are stuck in the benefit trap are taught skills that match their job prospects, then they will be more likely to seek work rather than remain in the benefit trap. They believe that there should be reciprocal obligations between the government and the individual, and that this will encourage welfare recipients to be more active in acquiring job skills and finding work, in order to prepare them for employment. In the United States, the government believes that the unemployed are not motivated to work, so they have taken steps to support work, such as raising the minimum wage, reducing taxes on low-income groups, and providing more health care to working families. However, the main measure that proved effective was the compulsory work scheme, wherein people could only receive benefits if they worked. This has led to a significant increase in the number of people employed and a reduction in the number of unemployed people caught in the welfare trap. In Australia, the government saw low work motivation as a barrier to the unemployed finding new jobs and moved away from helping the unemployed with skills training to motivating the unemployed to find work. The ultimate aim of these reforms is to reduce the number of unemployed people caught in the welfare trap.

== See also ==
- Basic income
- Catch-22
- Criticisms of welfare
- Generational poverty
- Means test
- Negative income tax
- Poverty trap
- The Rhetoric of Reaction
- Welfare's effect on poverty
- Welfare dependency
- Workfare
