= When Work Disappears =

1996 book by William Julius Wilson

- First edition cover
- Author: William Julius Wilson
- Genre: Sociology
- Publisher: Knopf
- Publication date: 1996
- ISBN: 978-0-394-57935-1

When Work Disappears: The World of the New Urban Poor (1996) is a book by William Julius Wilson, Professor of Social Policy at Harvard. Wilson's argument is that the disappearance of work and the consequences of that disappearance for both social and cultural life are the central problems in the inner-city ghetto. He sought to discuss social disorganization without stigmatizing the poor. Wilson writes that chronic joblessness has deprived those in the inner city of skills necessary to obtain and keep jobs. Wilson's book uses evidence from large-scale scientific surveys in the ghetto and information culled from ethnographic interviews of ghetto residents in order to create a complete picture of the problems that face the residents.

Wilson writes that people who inhabit the disorganized, jobless ghettos face dim prospects. Poor public transportation often fails to provide access to job locations, stereotypes about poor blacks, especially black men also make jobs harder to find. Wilson rejects the idea that inner-city residents have a "culture of poverty" or damaged personalities. He holds that addressing the problem of joblessness is the solution to urban inner-city problems. Wilson supports work programs modeled after Depression-era projects.

Wilson ties the disappearance of inner-city jobs to industrial restructuring, suburbanization, foreign competition, and racism.

== Influence ==
When Work Disappears has been cited as an inspiration for the second season of the HBO show The Wire.

== See also ==
- Involuntary unemployment
- Spatial mismatch
