= Welfare's effect on poverty =

The relationship between poverty reduction and differing levels of welfare expense as a percentage of GDP

The effects of social welfare on poverty have been the subject of various studies.

Studies have shown that in welfare states, poverty decreases after countries adopt welfare programs. Empirical evidence suggests that taxes and transfers considerably reduce poverty in most countries whose welfare states commonly constitute at least a fifth of GDP. In 2013, the Organisation for Economic Co-operation and Development asserted that welfare spending is vital in reducing the ever-expanding global wealth gap.

At the same time, the relationship between welfare and poverty is subject to many exogenous factors including the social determinants of poverty, welfare regime type, and the degree of systemic social, economic, and political prejudice against those living in poverty. Thus, while comparative studies in and across different welfare states point to an overall positive effect (that is, welfare reduces poverty), careful attention is required to the differences between welfare states in order to determine to what extent social policies are and are not effective.

== Empirical Studies ==
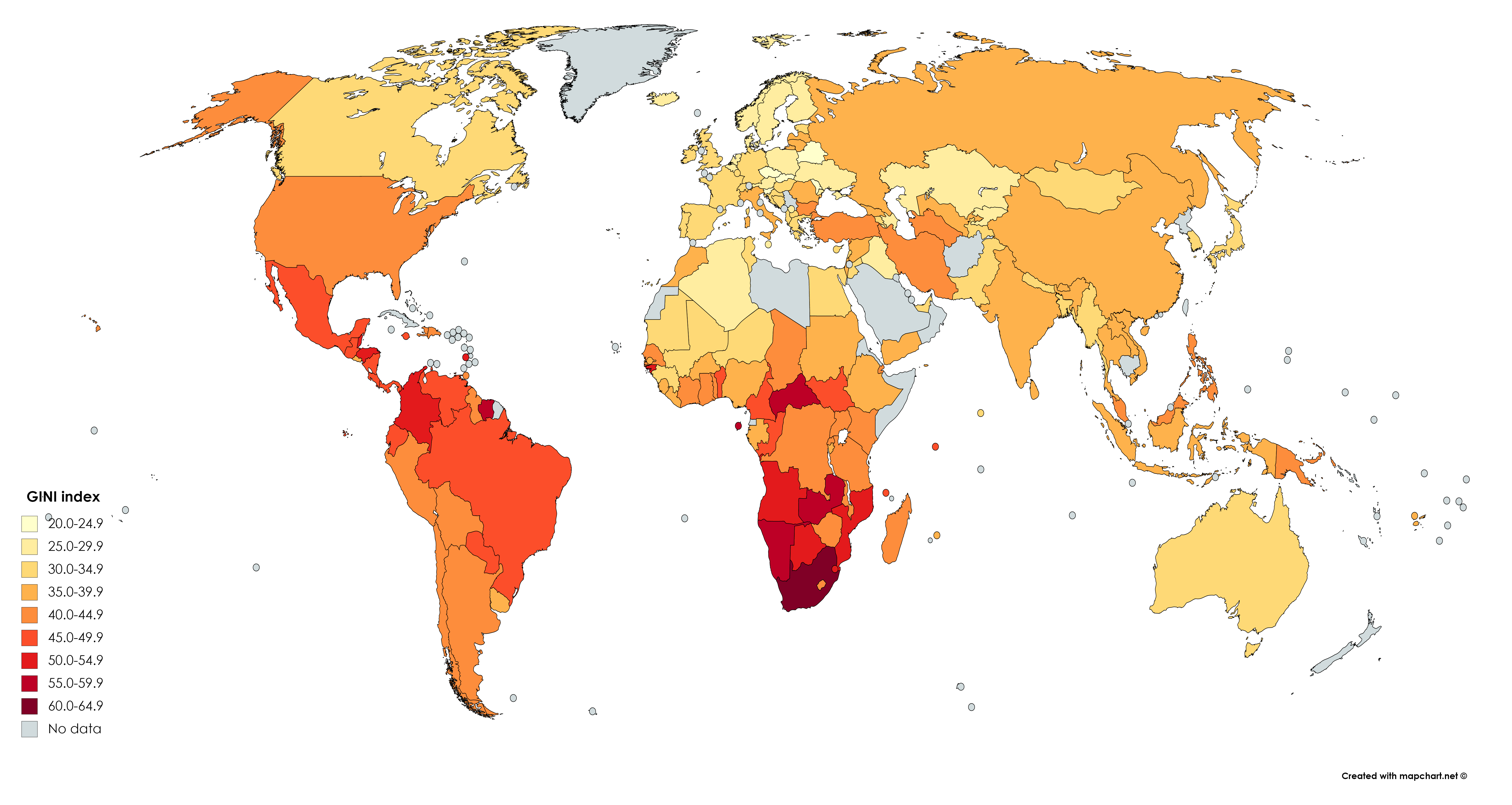
Countries' income inequality as of 2018 according to their Gini coefficients

World map indicating the Human Development Index in 2015

Quantitative measurement of the impact of welfare programs on poverty provides different estimates depending on the study design and available dataset. Many studies look at the net impact of tax and transfer programs on relative poverty as disaggregated analysis requires substantial amounts of high-quality data and robust estimation methods. Below are examples of notable studies that underscore the complexity of evaluating the direct causal mechanisms by which a welfare state reduces poverty.

=== Smeeding - "Poor People in Rich Nations" (2006) ===
Timothy Smeeding used data from the Luxembourg Income Study to determine the effectiveness of anti-poverty and welfare programs on poverty reduction. The data for all the countries was from the year 2000 with the exception of the United Kingdom and the Netherlands for which the data was from 1999. Smeeding concluded that post-tax transfer payments reduced both relative and absolute poverty levels in every country for which data was available, however, with significant variation between countries.

Country	Social expenditures on non-elderly (Note: This includes cash and near-cash spending (such as TANF and food stamps) and spending for public housing. It excludes healthcare and education spending.) (as percentage of GDP)	Total percent of poverty reduced
United States	2.3	26.4
Netherlands	9.6	65.2
Sweden	11.6	77.4
Germany	7.3	70.5
Canada	5.8	46.0
Finland	10.9	69.7
United Kingdom	7.1	60.1
Belgium	9.3	76.9
Austria	7.4	75.8
Italy	4.3	57.7
Ireland	5.5	44.1
Average	7.4	60.9

=== Kenworthy (1999) and Bradley et al. (2003) ===
The absolute poverty rates of various countries before and after their introduction of welfare

The relative poverty rates before and after the introduction of welfare of various countries

Two studies compare countries internationally before and after implementing social welfare programs. Using data from the Luxembourg Income Study, Bradley et al. and Lane Kenworthy measure the poverty rates both in relative terms (poverty defined by the respective governments) and absolute terms (poverty defined by 40% of United States median income), respectively. Kenworthy's study also adjusts for economic performance and shows that the economy made no significant difference in uplifting people out of poverty.

The studies look at the different countries from 1960 to 1991 (Kenworthy) and from 1970 to 1997 (Bradley et al.). Both these periods are roughly when major welfare programs were implemented such as the War on Poverty in the United States. The results of both studies show that poverty has been significantly reduced during the periods when major welfare programs were created.

Country	Absolute poverty rate (1960–1991) (threshold set at 40% of United States median household income)		Relative poverty rate (1970–1997)	
	Pre-welfare	Post-welfare	Pre-welfare	Post-welfare
Sweden	23.7	5.8	14.8	4.8
Norway	9.2	1.7	12.4	4.0
Netherlands	22.1	7.3	18.5	11.5
Finland	11.9	3.7	12.4	3.1
Denmark	26.4	5.9	17.4	4.8
Germany	15.2	4.3	9.7	5.1
Switzerland	12.5	3.8	10.9	9.1
Canada	22.5	6.5	17.1	11.9
France	36.1	9.8	21.8	6.1
Belgium	26.8	6.0	19.5	4.1
Australia	23.3	11.9	16.2	9.2
United Kingdom	16.8	8.7	16.4	8.2
United States	21.0	11.7	17.2	15.1
Italy	30.7	14.3	19.7	9.1

=== Korpi and Palme - The Paradox of Redistribution (1998) ===
In their groundbreaking 1998 study "The Paradox of Redistribution and Strategies of Equality", Walter Korpi and Joakim Palme constructed a model to test the redistributive efficiency of targeted and universal social welfare policies on reduction of poverty and income inequality. Using data from 18 OECD countries and the Luxembourg Income Study, Korpi and Palme identified a typology of five "ideal" social insurance institutions that can serve as the basis for evaluating the degree to which different welfare states are successful in achieving their redistributive goals.

Institution/Model	Bases of Entitlement to Welfare	Benefit-Level Principle	Employer-Employee Cooperation in Program Governance
Targeted	Proven need	Minimum	No
Voluntary state-subsidized	Membership, contributions	Flat-rate or earnings-related	No
Corporatist	Occupational category and labor force participation	Earnings-related	Yes
Basic security	Citizenship or contributions	Flat-rate	No
Encompassing	Citizenship and labor force participation	Flat-rate and earnings-related	No

Korpi and Palme highlighted the complexity of institutional structures of welfare states in that different states will have different combinations of institutional types for a given social welfare program. Nevertheless, the authors also argued that each welfare typology "can be expected to affect redistributive processes through differences in the role they accord to markets and to politics" as, for instance, the targeted model resembles a "Robin Hood" strategy whereas the basic security model reflects a "simple egalitarian strategy".

Examining the relative impact of these models, Korpi and Palme found that the redistributive efficiency of providing high-income earners with earnings-related benefits (e.g. private pensions) is higher than that of flat-rate (where everyone gets the same amount) or targeted (means-tested) benefits. This finding complicates the traditional hypothesis that a more generous welfare state will have been more successful at reducing income inequality and poverty; Korpi and Palme argue that this is due to three overlooked circumstances:

1. The size of the redistributive budget, that is, the amount invested in welfare programs, is not fixed and tends to vary depending on the type of welfare institutions in a country.
2. There is often a trade-off between the extent of targeting benefits for low-income individuals/households and the size of redistributive budgets.
3. The outcomes of market-based distribution (opposite of the decommodification of welfare) tend to be more unequal than the distribution of earnings-related social insurance programs due in part to the inability of lack of willingness to acquire private earnings-related insurance and social stratification.

These findings led to what Korpi and Palme titled the paradox of redistribution:

"The more we target benefits at the poor only and the more concerned we are with creating equality via equal public transfers to all, the less likely we are to reduce poverty and inequality [...] if we attempt to fight the war on poverty through target-efficient benefits concentrated on the poor, we may win some battle, but we will probably lose the war. Universalism is not enough, however. To be effective, universalism must be combined with a strategy of equality that comes closer to the preaching of Matthew than to the practices in Sherwood Forest"

== Criticisms and counterpoints ==
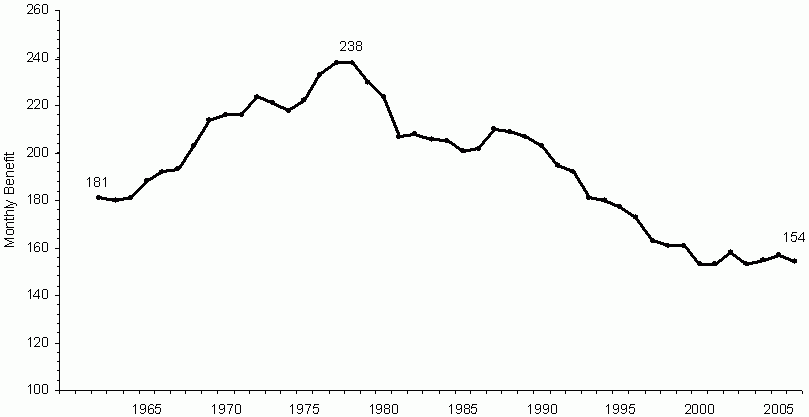
Decline in American welfare benefits since 1962 (in 2006 dollars)

In the United States, some members of both the Republican Party and Democratic Party, as well as third parties such as the Libertarian Party, have favored reducing or eliminating welfare. The landmark piece of legislation which reduced welfare was the Personal Responsibility and Work Opportunity Act under the Clinton administration.

Right-wing conservative groups such as The Heritage Foundation argue that welfare creates dependence, a disincentive to work and reduces the opportunity of individuals to manage their own lives. This dependence is called a "culture of poverty", which is said to undermine people from finding meaningful work. Many of these groups also point to the large budget used to maintain these programs and assert that it is wasteful.

According to a June 2015 report by the IMF, the defining challenge of our time is widening income inequality. In advanced economies, the gap between the rich and poor is at its highest level in decades. Inequality trends have been more mixed in emerging markets and developing countries (EMDCs), with some countries experiencing declining inequality, but pervasive inequities in access to education, health care, and finance remain.

Some socialists and Marxists argue that welfare states and modern social democratic policies limit the incentive system of the market by providing things such as minimum wages, unemployment insurance, taxing profits and reducing the reserve army of labor, resulting in capitalists having little incentive to invest. In essence, social welfare policies cripple the capitalist system and increase poverty. By implementing public or cooperative ownership of the means of production, some socialists believe there will be no need for a welfare state.

Critics of welfare claim that too little of the transferred income actually reaches poor people, that the safety net welfare provides creates a "poverty trap" by reducing the initiative of poor people, and that welfare weakens the economy.

A 2010 study examining the effects of the Personal Responsibility and Work Opportunity Reconciliation Act of 1996 found that the act's "welfare cutbacks did not increase poverty rates."

Larry Summers estimated in 2007 that the lower 80% of families were receiving $664 billion less income than they would be with a 1979 income distribution, or approximately $7,000 per family. Not receiving this income may have led many families to increase their debt burden, a significant factor in the 2007–2009 subprime mortgage crisis, as highly leveraged homeowners suffered a much larger reduction in their net worth during the crisis. Further, since lower income families tend to spend relatively more of their income than higher income families, shifting more of the income to wealthier families may slow economic growth.

== Public opinion ==
A January 2014 Pew Research poll found that 49% of Americans believe government aid to the poor does more good than harm as people can not escape poverty until basic needs are met and 54% believe taxes should be increased on the wealthy and corporations to expand anti-poverty programs.

In 2019, the Cato Institute's "Welfare, Work, and Wealth National Survey" concluded that an overwhelming majority of Americans believe the government to be incapable of fighting poverty and that existing welfare expenditures are insufficient or inefficiently distributed. 70% of respondents, across the political spectrum, perceive addressing the underlying causes of poverty to be more important than increases to anti-poverty welfare initiatives. The same study also found that 79% of those surveyed favor "economic growth" as a potential solution to the poverty cycle over welfare spending.

== Poverty's effect on welfare ==
While the effect of social welfare on poverty has been documented across both quantitative and qualitative studies, consideration of reverse causality is important in understanding the extent to which welfare can address poverty. In other words, the perception of poverty and the poor can determine the degree to which the welfare state is willing to address poverty. For example, the cultural shift towards viewing poverty as an issue of "behavioral dependency" of deficiency directly influenced the reduction of entitlement welfare pushed by the Clinton Administration in the PRWORA. The transition from "welfare" to "workfare" is of particular interest to feminist scholars and social scientists who link preconceived ideas about the poor, moral anxiety around teenage pregnancy (read women's bodies and reproductive role), reproducing white supremacy, and reinforcing capitalism, to the welfare reform of the 20th century.

Welfare stigma (historically expressed and experienced as the pejorative welfare queen and welfare mother labels) further exacerbates the socioeconomic factors mediating the impact of welfare. Social stigma is prevalent towards recipients of public assistance programs. The value of self-reliance is often at the center of feelings of shame and the fewer people value self reliance the less stigma effects them psychologically. Stigma towards welfare recipients has been proven to increase passivity and dependency in poor people and has further solidified their status and feelings of inferiority. Caseworkers frequently treat recipients of welfare disrespectfully and make assumptions about deviant behavior and reluctance to work. Many single mothers cited stigma as the primary reason they wanted to exit welfare as quickly as possible. Recipients of public assistance are viewed as objects of the community rather than members allowing for them to be perceived as enemies of the community which is how stigma enters collective thought. Amongst single mothers in poverty, lack of health care benefits is one of their greatest challenges in terms of exiting poverty. Traditional values of self reliance increase feelings of shame amongst welfare recipients making them more susceptible to being stigmatized. Studies show that U.S. states with stronger anti-welfare sentiment amplify the experience of welfare stigma, especially along the lines of race, ethnicity, and education.

== See also ==
- Basic income
- Criticisms of welfare
- Involuntary unemployment
- Welfare economics
- Welfare trap
- Welfare dependency
