= Alford Young =

American sociologist

Alford A. Young, Jr.
- Occupation: Sociologist
- Title: Arthur F. Thurnau Professor and Edgar G. Epps Collegiate Professor of Sociology
- Board member of: American Sociological Association

Academic background
- Education: Wesleyan University (BA). Chicago University (MA, PhD).
- Thesis: Pathways, possibilities, and potential: young Black men and their conceptions of future life chances. (1996)
- Doctoral advisor: William Julius Wilson

Academic work
- Institutions: University of Michigan
- Notable works: From the Edge of the Ghetto: African Americans and the World of Work (2019)

Alford A. Young Jr. is an American sociologist. He is the Arthur F. Thurnau Professor and the Edgar G. Epps Collegiate Professor of Sociology at the University of Michigan. Young researches the social experiences of African American people. Young is the 2027 president-elect of the American Sociological Association.

== Early life and education ==
Young grew up in East Harlem, New York City. In 1988, Young graduated with a bachelor's degree in sociology, psychology, and Afro-American studies from Wesleyan University. Young earned an MA and PhD in sociology at the University of Chicago. At the University of Chicago, Young's doctoral advisor was William Julius Wilson. Young's doctoral thesis was titled "Pathways, possibilities, and potential: Young Black men and their conceptions of future life chances". The thesis was based on interviews with low-income African American men aged 20–25 in the city of Chicago, Illinois.

== Career ==
Young became an assistant professor at the University of Michigan in 1996. Young has worked as the chair of the sociology department at the University of Michigan. At the University of Michigan, Young teaches sociology and African-American studies. In 2023, Young was named University Diversity and Social Transformation Professor at the University of Michigan. In 2025, Young became the president-elect of the American Sociological Association.

In 2004, Young authored The Minds of Marginalized Black Men: Making Sense of Mobility, Opportunity, and Future Life Chances, published by Princeton University Press. John L. Jackson Jr., reviewing the book in the American Journal of Sociology, wrote that it was "an exceptional rejoinder to standard attempts at describing black men’s contemporary crises" and praised Young's writing as "reflexive without being self-indulgent". Terrence T. Allen, reviewing the book in the Journal of Urban Affairs, wrote that "The Minds of Marginalized Black Men will soon take its place among the most important ethnographic studies on the subject" and suggested that it will "help to replace the overly simplistic, conventional pathological analysis of black men with a worldview analysis that takes into consideration the social environment from which they are reared."

In 2018, Young released Are Black Men Doomed? which was published by Polity Press. The book reflects on scholarship concerning the so-called "Black male problem" and position of Black men in the United States of America. Jonathan M. Cox, reviewing the book in the journal Men and Masculinities, described the book as "a cohesive, thoughtful call to reconsider societal narratives and beliefs surrounding black men". Gökhan Savas, reviewing for the journal International Sociology, described the book as "readable and to the point" and suggested that the book responded "Yes, black men are doomed in the United States". Savas described the book as "a good book for a thoughtful person who has a poor conception of black men and has had little or no contact with them".

In 2019, Young's book From the edge of the ghetto: African Americans and the world of work was published by Bloomsbury. In the book, Young works from interviews with 103 low-income African Americans in Ypsilanti, Michigan to consider thoughts and perspectives concerning work and opportunity.

Young has been on the editorial boards of the American Journal of Cultural Sociology, Work and Occupations, Qualitative Sociology, Racial and Ethnic Studies, Sociological Studies of Children, Social Psychology Quarterly, Sociological Theory, the American Sociological Association's Rose Series in Sociology, and the American Journal of Sociology.

== Books ==
- Young Jr, Alford A. (2004). The Minds of Marginalized Black Men: Making Sense of Mobility, Opportunity, and Future Life Chances. Princeton University Press.
- Young Jr, Alford A. (2018). Are Black men doomed?. Polity.
- Young Jr, Alford. (2019). From the edge of the ghetto: African Americans and the world of work. Bloomsbury Publishing PLC.

== Select writings ==
- Young, A. A. (2004). Experiences in ethnographic interviewing about race: The inside and outside of it. In Researching race and racism (pp. 187–202). Routledge.
- Young, A. A. (1999). The (non) accumulation of capital: Explicating the relationship of structure and agency in the lives of poor black men. Sociological theory, 17(2), 201–227.
- Young Jr, A. A. (2010). New life for an old concept: Frame analysis and the reinvigoration of studies in culture and poverty. The annals of the American Academy of political and Social Science, 629(1), 53–74.
- Young Jr, A. A. (2021). Black men and Black masculinity. Annual Review of Sociology, 47(1), 437–457.
