= Family Support Act =

Act of the US Congress

The Family Support Act of 1988 (Pub. L. 100–485, 102 Stat. 2343, enacted October 13, 1988) was a federal law that amended Title IV of the Social Security Act to revise the Aid to Families with Dependent Children (AFDC) program to emphasize work, child support and family benefits, as well as on withholding the wages of absentee parents. The Job Opportunities and Basic Skills Training program (JOBS) was a welfare-to-work program created by the Family Support Act to replace the Work Incentive program (WIN).

An Associated Press article said that the law "required teen mothers who receive public assistance to remain in high school and, in some cases, to live with their parents."
