= Century Institute =

The Century Institute is a summer program for politically liberal college students. It is sponsored by the Century Foundation, a liberal think tank started in 1919 by Edward A. Filene.

Its faculty has included many late 20th Century progressivism, including Prof. William Julius Wilson, activist Todd Gitlin, academic Arthur Schlesinger Jr. and UN official Gillian Martin Sorensen and her husband, John F. Kennedy advisor and speechwriter Theodore C. Sorensen. Others included journalist Al From, writer Jedediah Purdy, Clinton advisor Robert Reich and strategist/blogger Ruy Teixeira.

From 1999 until 2003, CISP was held on the campus of Williams College in western Massachusetts, drawing 30 students each year from prestigious colleges. Unfortunately, in a fate common to many progressive causes, it faced funding troubles from the beginning. Money ran out in 2004 and the program was canceled for 2005.

The program's few dozen alumni have begun careers in law, academia, politics, journalism, education and overseas service.

== Advisors ==
CISP'S original board of advisors:

- Alan Sagner, founder, Sagner Family Foundation
- Alan Brinkley Allan Nevis Professor of History, Columbia University
- Alicia Munnell Peter F. Drucker Chair in Management Sciences, Boston College
- Richard C. Leone, president, The Century Foundation
- Arthur Schlesinger Jr., City University of New York
- Theodore C. Sorensen, speechwriter and advisor to President John F. Kennedy
- William Julius Wilson, Harvard University
- Paul Starr, cofounder and editor of The American Prospect
