= The Truly Disadvantaged =

Book by William Julius Wilson

The Truly Disadvantaged: The Inner City, the Underclass, and Public Policy
- First edition
- Author: William Julius Wilson
- Subject: Public policy, poverty, racial inequality in the United States
- Publisher: University of Chicago Press
- Publication date: 1987, 2012
- Publication place: United States
- Pages: 320
- ISBN: 9780226901268

The Truly Disadvantaged: The Inner City, the Underclass, and Public Policy is a book by William Julius Wilson. The book was first published in 1987; a second edition was published in 2012. It examines the relationship between race and poverty in the United States, and the history of American inner-city ghettos. The broad-ranging book rejects both conservative and liberal arguments for the social conditions in American inner cities. In it, Wilson argues that the decline of such conditions is due to "basic economic changes which radically altered the occupational structure of the central cities," such as the withdrawal of large industries from inner cities during the 1970s. He also criticizes the architects of the War on Poverty during the 1960s, saying that they focused too much on poverty as a problem of environment rather than as a problem of "economic organization".

== Reception and impact ==
Robert Greenstein wrote that "The Truly Disadvantaged should spur critical rethinking in many quarters about the causes and potential remedies for inner city poverty. As policy makers grapple with the problems of an enlarged underclass, they - as well as community leaders and concerned Americans of all races - would be advised to examine Mr. Wilson's incisive analysis." In his review of the book, James Jennings wrote that "...despite its important contribution to ongoing public policy debates regarding race and poverty, it falls short of a complete class and racial analysis and still approaches the black urban poor as politically incompetent." In 2001, Mario Luis Small and Katherine Newman described the book as "the most important publication in urban poverty over the past twenty-five years."
