= William Julius Wilson =

American sociologist (born 1935)

- Born: December 20, 1935 (age 90); Derry, Pennsylvania, U.S.
- Awards: National Medal of Science (1998); Talcott Parsons Prize (2003); Moynihan Prize (2013)

Academic background
- Education: Wilberforce University; Bowling Green State University; Washington State University

Academic work
- Discipline: Sociology
- Institutions: Harvard University; University of Chicago
- Doctoral students: Michael Burawoy; Sudhir Venkatesh; Loïc Wacquant; Alford Young
- Notable works: The Truly Disadvantaged (1987)

William Julius Wilson (born December 20, 1935) is an American sociologist, a professor emeritus at Harvard University, and an author of works on urban sociology, race, and class issues. Laureate of the National Medal of Science, he served as the 80th President of the American Sociological Association, was a member of numerous national boards and commissions. He identified the importance of neighborhood effects and demonstrated how limited employment opportunities and weakened institutional resources exacerbated poverty within American inner-city neighborhoods.

== Career ==
Wilson is Lewis P. and Linda L. Geyser University Professor, Emeritus, at Harvard University. He is one of 25 University Professors, the highest professional distinction for a Harvard faculty member. After receiving a PhD from Washington State University in 1966, Wilson taught sociology at the University of Massachusetts Amherst, before joining the University of Chicago faculty in 1972. In 1990 he was appointed the Lucy Flower University Professor and director of the University of Chicago's Center for the Study of Urban Inequality.

He joined the faculty at Harvard in July 1996. He is affiliated with the Malcolm Wiener Center for Social Policy at the Harvard Kennedy School, the Hutchins Center for African and African American Research, and Harvard's Department of Sociology. He is a member of the Library of Congress Scholars Council.

Wilson was an original board member of the progressive Century Institute, and a current board member at Philadelphia-based Public/Private Ventures, PolicyLink, and the Center on Budget and Policy Priorities. He was Sudhir Venkatesh's advisor when Venkatesh was a PhD student at the University of Chicago.

== Research and scholarly work ==
Wilson's research has focused on social stratification, race and ethnicity, urban poverty, labor markets, residential segregation, and public policy in the United States. Throughout his career, he has examined how economic restructuring, demographic change, public policy, and institutional processes shape racial and class inequality. His scholarship combines sociological theory with empirical research and has influenced fields including sociology, economics, political science, urban studies, public policy, and education.

=== Race, class, and changing patterns of inequality ===
Wilson's early scholarship examined the relationship between race and social class in the United States. His first book, Power, Racism, and Privilege (1973), explored theories of racial stratification and political power, analyzing the relationship between institutional inequality, race relations, and social structure. The book introduced themes that would remain central throughout his academic career, particularly the interaction of race, class, and public policy.

He gained national recognition with The Declining Significance of Race (1978), which argued that the class structure of African American communities had become increasingly differentiated following the civil rights movement. Wilson contended that while racial discrimination continued to shape opportunities, socioeconomic class had become an increasingly important determinant of life chances among African Americans. The book challenged prevailing explanations that treated race as the primary determinant of inequality and encouraged greater attention to economic and structural change. It received the C. Wright Mills Award and became one of the most influential works in modern American sociology.

=== Urban poverty and the transformation of the inner city ===
During the 1980s, Wilson shifted his research toward concentrated urban poverty and the effects of economic restructuring on American cities. His best-known work, The Truly Disadvantaged: The Inner City, the Underclass, and Public Policy (1987), examined the social consequences of deindustrialization, suburbanization, residential segregation, and the decline of manufacturing employment. Wilson argued that these structural changes produced concentrated poverty in many inner-city neighborhoods, contributing to long-term unemployment, weakened community institutions, and social isolation. The book challenged cultural explanations of poverty by emphasizing structural economic forces while recognizing that prolonged disadvantage could influence community norms and behavior. It became a landmark publication in urban sociology and substantially influenced scholarship on neighborhood effects, spatial inequality, and urban public policy. The concepts developed in The Truly Disadvantaged shaped subsequent research on concentrated poverty, segregation, and neighborhood disadvantage across several disciplines.

Wilson further developed these themes in When Work Disappears: The World of the New Urban Poor (1996). Focusing on the decline of stable employment in inner-city communities, he examined how joblessness affected family formation, educational attainment, social networks, neighborhood institutions, and intergenerational mobility. Wilson argued that the disappearance of work had broader social consequences beyond income loss, altering the social organization of disadvantaged communities and limiting opportunities for economic advancement. The book became an important contribution to debates on welfare reform, workforce development, and urban economic policy.

== Structural inequality and public policy ==
Wilson continued to expand his theoretical framework in More Than Just Race: Being Black and Poor in the Inner City (2009). Building on his earlier research, he argued that persistent racial inequality results from the interaction of structural, economic, political, historical, and cultural factors rather than any single explanation. Rejecting approaches that focused exclusively on either structural barriers or cultural behavior, Wilson proposed an integrated framework that examined how these forces reinforce one another over time. The book also examined the relationship between public policy and inequality, arguing that employment, education, housing, and social welfare policies should address both structural disadvantage and racial disparities. It became an important contribution to contemporary debates concerning poverty, race, affirmative action, and social mobility.

== Urban inequality, education, and public policy ==
Beyond his major books, Wilson has written extensively on concentrated poverty, labor markets, residential segregation, education reform, social mobility, welfare policy, and neighborhood revitalization. His later scholarship has explored the effects of globalization, technological change, declining industrial employment, and widening income inequality on disadvantaged communities. He has also examined urban education, the relationship between schools and neighborhood conditions, multiracial political coalitions, immigration, democratic participation, and the persistence of economic inequality. His publications have argued that policies promoting employment opportunities, educational investment, and neighborhood development can improve economic outcomes while reducing racial disparities.

=== Sociological theory and methodology ===
In addition to his empirical research, Wilson has made contributions to sociological theory and methodology. His publications have examined the relationship between structural and cultural explanations of poverty, the integration of qualitative and quantitative research methods, and the role of theory in ethnographic research. He has argued that complex social problems require multidisciplinary approaches that combine historical analysis, demographic research, survey data, ethnographic observation, and policy analysis.

=== Influence ===
Wilson's scholarship has significantly influenced the study of race, class, poverty, and urban inequality. His analyses of concentrated poverty, social isolation, labor-market transformation, and neighborhood effects have shaped research in sociology, economics, political science, urban planning, education, and public policy. His books have generated extensive scholarly debate and remain widely assigned in university courses on social stratification, race relations, urban sociology, and social policy. His concepts continue to inform research on residential segregation, employment inequality, neighborhood disadvantage, and the structural causes of poverty in the United States.

Wilson's book When Work Disappears has been cited as an inspiration for the second season of the HBO show The Wire.

== Honors ==
Past President of the American Sociological Association, Wilson has received honorary doctorates from Yale, Princeton University, Columbia University, the University of Pennsylvania, Northwestern University, Johns Hopkins University, New York University, Bard College, Dartmouth College, and the University of Amsterdam in the Netherlands.

In June 1996 he was selected by Time magazine as one of America's 25 Most Influential People. In 1997, he received the Golden Plate Award of the American Academy of Achievement. He is a recipient of the 1998 National Medal of Science, the highest scientific honor in the United States, and the W.E.B. Du Bois Career of Distinguished Scholarship Award by the American Sociological Association in 2014, the highest award bestowed by the American Sociological Association.

Other honors granted to Wilson include the Seidman Award in Political Economy (the first and only non-economist to receive the award).

In 2012, the Inequality, Poverty, and Mobility Section of the American Sociological Association renamed its Early Career Award as the William Julius Wilson Early Career Award.

Wilson was previously the Chair of the Board of the Center for Advanced Study in the Behavioral Sciences and of the Russell Sage Foundation.

In 2010, Wilson received the Anisfield-Wolf Book Award Lifetime Achievement Award in Nonfiction.

== Selected bibliography ==
=== Books ===
- Wilson, W. J. (1973). Power, racism, and privilege: Race relations in theoretical and sociohistorical perspectives. Free Press.
- Wilson, W. J. (1978). The declining significance of race: Blacks and changing American institutions. University of Chicago Press.
- Wilson, W. J. (1987). The truly disadvantaged: The inner city, the underclass, and public policy. University of Chicago Press.
- Wilson, W. J. (1996). When work disappears: The world of the new urban poor. Alfred A. Knopf.
- Wilson, W. J. (2009). More than just race: Being Black and poor in the inner city. W. W. Norton & Company.

=== Edited books ===
- Wilson, W. J. (Ed.). (1989). Sociology and the public agenda. SAGE Publications.
- Wilson, W. J. (Ed.). (1993). The ghetto underclass: Social science perspectives. SAGE Publications.

Professional and academic associations
Preceded by Joan Huber	President of the American Sociological Association; 1990	Succeeded by Stanley Lieberson
Awards
Preceded by Fox Butterfield	Hillman Prize for Book Journalism; 1997	Succeeded by Robert Kuttner
Preceded by Joseph Greenberg	Talcott Parsons Prize; 2003	Succeeded by Daniel Kahneman
Preceded by Paule Marshall	Anisfield-Wolf Book Award for Lifetime Achievement; 2010; With: Elizabeth Alexander and Oprah Winfrey	Succeeded by John Edgar Wideman
New award	William Julius Wilson Award; 2011	Succeeded by David Simon
Preceded by Paul Volcker	Daniel Patrick Moynihan Prize; 2013	Succeeded by Joseph Stiglitz
Preceded by Joe Feagin	W.E.B. Du Bois Career of Distinguished Scholarship Award; 2014	Succeeded by John W. Meyer
