= Culture of poverty =

Social theory asserting that value systems perpetuate poverty

The culture of poverty is a concept in social theory that asserts that the values of people experiencing poverty play a significant role in perpetuating their impoverished condition, sustaining a cycle of poverty across generations. It attracted policy attention in the 1970s, and received academic criticism (Goode & Eames 1996), and made a comeback at the beginning of the 21st century. It offers one way to explain why poverty exists despite anti-poverty programs. Early formulations suggest that poor people lack resources and acquire a poverty-perpetuating value system. Critics of the early culture of poverty arguments insist that explanations of poverty must analyze how structural factors interact with and condition individual characteristics (Goode & Eames 1996). As put by Small & Harding (2010), "since human action is both constrained and enabled by the meaning people give to their actions, these dynamics should become central to our understanding of the production and reproduction of poverty and social inequality." Further discourse suggests that Oscar Lewis's work was misunderstood.

== Overview ==
De Antuñano (2019) states the theory of the culture of poverty was popularized in 1958 by anthropologist Oscar Lewis, following his research in Mexico City. The culture of poverty frames low-income earners as existing within a culture that perpetuates poverty in a generational cycle. The theory suggests that the economic climate does not play a significant role in poverty. Those existing within a culture of poverty largely bring poverty upon themselves through acquired habits and behaviours. Lewis's work sparked debates in the following decades. Many people disagree with his theory and believe it has little to no merit. De Antuñano (2019) quotes that the culture of poverty was "denounced as methodologically vague and politically misguided."

== Early formulations ==
The term "culture of poverty" (previously "subculture of poverty") made its first appearance in Lewis's ethnography Five Families: Mexican Case Studies in the Culture of Poverty. Lewis struggled to render "the poor" as legitimate subjects whose lives were transformed by poverty. He argued that although the burdens of poverty were systemic and imposed upon these members of society, they led to the formation of an autonomous subculture as children were socialized into behaviors and attitudes that perpetuated their inability to escape the underclass.

Early proponents of the theory argued that people with low incomes are not only lacking resources but also acquire a poverty-perpetuating value system. According to anthropologist Oscar Lewis, "The subculture [of the poor] develops mechanisms that tend to perpetuate it, especially because of what happens to the worldview, aspirations, and character of the children who grow up in it". (Lewis 1969, p. 199)

Lewis identified 70 characteristics that indicated the presence of a culture of poverty, which he argued was not shared by all lower classes. Oscar Lewis's interest in poverty inspired other cultural anthropologists to study poverty. Their interest was based on his idea of a culture of poverty.

The people in the culture of poverty have a strong feeling of marginality, of helplessness, of dependency, of not belonging. They are like aliens in their own country, convinced that the existing institutions do not serve their interests and needs. Along with this feeling of powerlessness is a widespread feeling of inferiority, of personal unworthiness. This is true of the slum dwellers of Mexico City, who do not constitute a distinct ethnic or racial group and do not suffer from racial discrimination. In the United States, the culture of poverty of African Americans has the additional disadvantage of racial discrimination.

People with a culture of poverty have very little sense of history. They are a marginal people who know only their own troubles, their own local conditions, their own neighborhood, their own way of life. Usually, they have neither the knowledge, the vision, nor the ideology to see the similarities between their problems and those of others like themselves elsewhere in the world. In other words, they are not class conscious, although they are very sensitive indeed to status distinctions.

Although Lewis (1998) was concerned with poverty in the developing world, the culture of poverty concept proved attractive to US public policy makers and politicians. It strongly informed documents such as the Moynihan Report (1965) as well as the War on Poverty.

The culture of poverty emerges as a key concept in Michael Harrington's discussion of American poverty in The Other America. For Harrington, the culture of poverty is a structural concept defined by social institutions of exclusion that create and perpetuate the cycle of poverty in America.

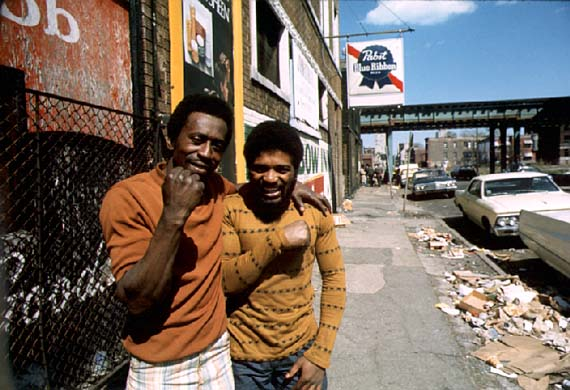
Chicago ghetto on the South Side, May 1974.

== Reactions ==
Since the 1960s, critics of the culture-of-poverty explanations for the persistence of the underclass have attempted to show that real-world data do not fit Lewis's model (Goode & Eames 1996). In 1974, anthropologist Carol Stack issued a critique, calling it "fatalistic," and noted that believing in the idea of a culture of poverty does not describe the poor so much as it serves the interests of the rich.

She writes, citing Hylan Lewis, another critic of Oscar Lewis's Culture of Poverty:

The culture of poverty, as Hylan Lewis points out, has a fundamental political nature. The ideas matter most to political and scientific groups attempting to rationalize why some Americans have failed to make it in American society. It is, Lewis (1971) argues, "an idea that people believe, want to believe, and perhaps need to believe." They want to believe that raising the income of the poor would not change their lifestyles or values, but merely funnel greater sums of money into bottomless, self-destructing pits. This fatalistic view has wide acceptance among scholars, welfare planners, and voters. At the most prestigious university, the country's theories alleging racial inferiority have become increasingly prevalent. She demonstrates the way that political interests to keep the wages of the poor low create a climate in which it is politically convenient to buy into the idea of culture of poverty (Stack 1974). In sociology and anthropology, the concept created a backlash, pushing scholars to look to structures rather than "blaming-the-victim".

Since the late 1990s, the culture of poverty has witnessed a resurgence in social sciences, but most scholars now reject the notion of a monolithic and unchanging culture of poverty. Newer research typically rejects the idea that whether people are poor can be explained by their values. It is often reluctant to divide explanations into "structural" and "cultural," because of the increasingly questionable utility of this old distinction.

An example of this is discussed by critical race theorist Gloria Ladson-Billings (2017). She observed the culture of poverty theory used to explain why some urban schools are unsuccessful. She says that parents of children in low-income families care immensely for their children and encourage their education and success. Ladson-Billings (2017) says, "I find the culture of poverty discourse so disturbing because it distorts the concept of culture and absolves social structures—government and institutional— of responsibility for the vulnerabilities that poor children regularity face."

== Further discourse ==
Hill (2002) states that some recent scholars believe the work of Oscar Lewis on the culture of poverty was misinterpreted. They believe his theory was not intended to suggest that low-income earners choose to live in poverty. They believe the culture of poverty is a result of coping mechanisms developed by low-income earners. It helps them accept their circumstances, which takes a great deal of personal strength. Recent scholars also suggest that Oscar Lewis acknowledged institutional shortcomings.

According to Kurtz (2014), Oscar Lewis studied and acknowledged the traumatic nature of poverty. During his research in Mexico in the 1950s, he discovered ways people cope and manage their impoverished state. Oscar Lewis's work inspired cultural anthropologists to study the culture of poverty. Kurtz (2014) states that the research concludes that "Poverty has always been more than a social and economic issue. The politics of poverty always exists dialectically among competing interests that use power either to allocate or withhold aid to the impoverished depending upon whether those who possess power think that the poor either deserve or do not deserve relief from their impoverishment."

== See also ==
- Attributions for poverty
- Poverty in the United States
  - History of poverty in the United States
- Cycle of poverty
- Involuntary unemployment
- Causes of income inequality in the United States
- Wealth inequality in the United States
- Welfare's effect on poverty
- When Work Disappears
- Economic inequality
- Desert (philosophy)
- Pauperism
- Social inequality
- Unemployment
- Social stigma
- Deprivation index
- Working-class culture
