= Working Links =

British outsourcing subcontractor

Working Links (Employment) Limited
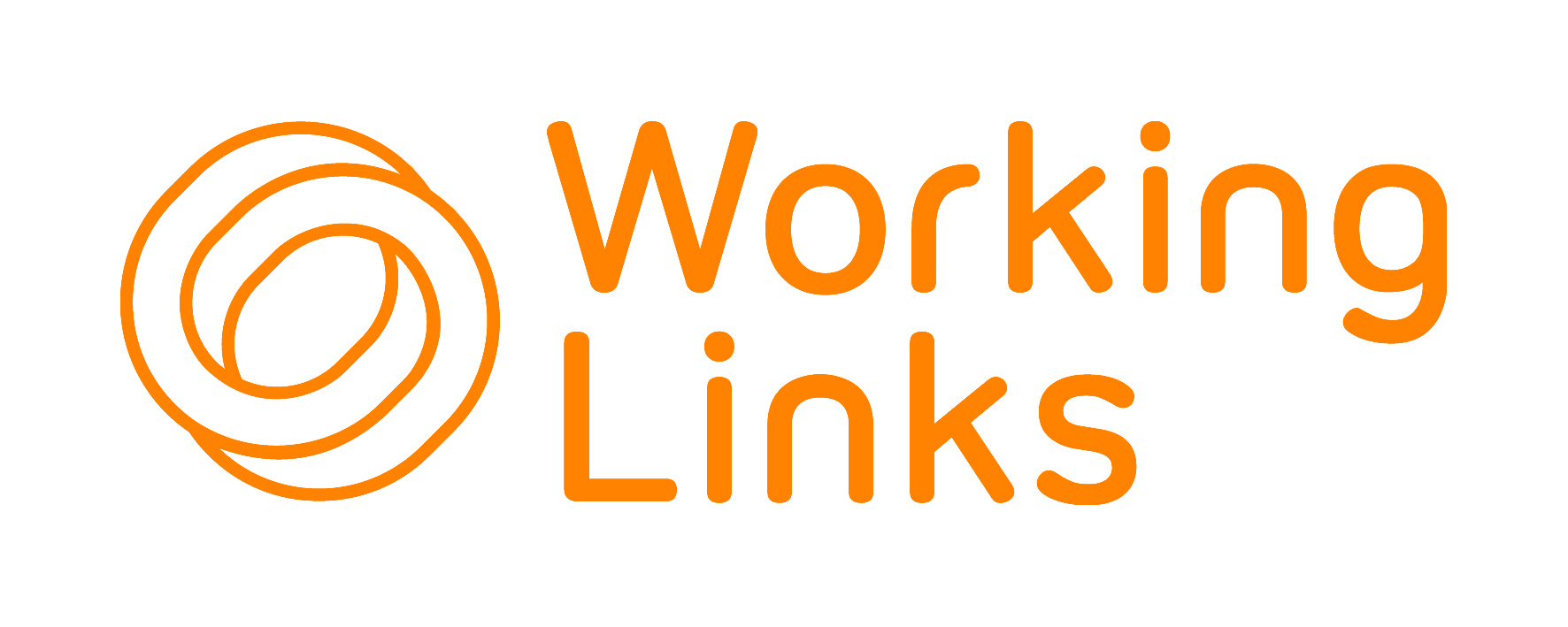
- Founder: William Cook, Keith Faulkner, Sir Leigh Lewis
- Defunct: February 2019
- Headquarters: Middlesbrough, United Kingdom
- Number of locations: 100+ (2015)
- Area served: UK, Ireland, Middle East
- Key people: Steve Jones, COO, Raj Patel, CFO.
- Number of employees: 1500
- Divisions: Employability, Skills, Apprenticeships, International, Justice
- Subsidiaries: Turas Nua – Ireland, Start Scotland Wales CRC, Devon, Dorset & Cornwall CRC Bristol, Swindon, Wiltshire & Gloucestershire CRC.
- Website: workinglinks.co.uk

Working Links (formally Working Links (Employment) Limited) was a British outsourcing subcontractor established in 2000 as a public, private and voluntary company that provided welfare services and help with employability. It was acquired by the investment group Aurelius in June 2016.

Originally specialising in welfare-to-work, Working Links diversified into other areas of subcontracting of the public sector including the Probation Service. Their turnover grew from £63 million in 2006 to £123 million in 2012.

Despite having had £1 billion of contracts, Working Links went into administration in February 2019.

In 2012 company was the subject of fraud allegations made by its former chief auditor Eddie Hutchinson. Working Links denied the allegations, stating that they have "a zero-tolerance approach to fraud and rigorous processes in place to handle any suspected incidents of fraud or other misconduct." The Department for Work and Pensions stated that the "allegations all relate to programmes run by the previous government" and that they have measures in place to prevent fraud.

== History ==
Working Links was established in 2000 at the height of New Labour by the Shareholder Executive, Manpower and Ernst & Young Consulting. Ernst & Young Consulting merged with Gemini Consulting, a branch of Capgemini, to form Cap Gemini Ernst & Young. Cap Gemini Ernst & Young was renamed Capgemini in 2004. The charity Mission Australia acquired a share of the company in 2006, rendering Working Links the first public, private and voluntary organisation in the UK.

European investment firm Aurelius acquired Working Links for an undisclosed sum in June 2016.

It had contracts for welfare-to-work under New Labour's Employment Zones, Pathways to Work, Progress to Work, New Deal, New Deal for Disabled People, Work Choice, ESF Family Support and the later Flexible New Deal which was initially continued by the coalition, before being replaced by the Work Programme, and the subsequent seven different welfare-to-work schemes of the early-2010s, all of which involved workfare.

Of the seven schemes now four, Working Links was a subcontractor for them all and a 'Placement Provider' for workfare in several. The schemes being: the short-lived community work placements (2014–15), the Community Action Programme, Mandatory Work Activity, Work Experience, the Work Programme, Sector Based Work Academies and Traineeships.

In 2011, Working Links won three contract package areas to deliver the Coalition government's new Work Programme. This made Working Links the third largest Work Programme provider in the UK. The three contracts acquired were the South West, Wales and Scotland and, as of May 2012, received around £120 million a year from the DWP and various other governmental bodies.

14 February 2019 Message from Working Links staff 'As of today Working Links has entered administration – you may see this on the news. As a result of this all operations have been ceased with immediate effect.' Shortly after this the company came back and now known as 'Links to Work'.

== Work Programme ==
Working Links claimed to have had more than 62,000 unemployed claimants referred to it 62,000 people find a job through the Work Programme, as of June 2015. Working Links referred the most cases for financial sanctions (11,910) to be taken against welfare recipients amongst Work Programme suppliers between June 2011 and January 2012.

Richard Whittell from Corporate Watch said the Work Programme appeared to be focused on slashing benefit rather than putting people into work. "These figures give the lie to the government's claims its welfare reforms are about helping people into work".

"By the time it's finished, more people will have been sanctioned by the Work Programme than properly employed through it. Every month thousands of people are having their only source of income stopped and being pushed into hardship. Companies like Serco, Working Links and G4S may not be very good at finding people suitable work, but they're dab hands at punishing them. The private firms say they make their referrals to job centres in line with government guidelines."

Despite being itself an outsourcing subcontractor, Working Links subcontracted its own contracts to companies such as Triage and Routes To Work in North Lanarkshire. The BBC broadcast a documentary in which five former employees of Triage claimed that disabled and jobless people processed by the company were referred to as LTB's (Lying Thieving Bastards). A spokesman for Working Links said "We work with a number of subcontractors all of whom go through a stringent vetting and approval process. We take any allegations of poor practice seriously and will be looking into matters further."

== Transforming Rehabilitation ==
In 2015, Working Links was awarded contracts to run three Community Rehabilitation Companies (CRCs) as part of the government's Transforming Rehabilitation reforms with the aim of cutting reoffending. Under the reforms, probation services were split into two with the National Probation Service managing high risk offenders and CRCs managing low and medium risk offenders. Working Links was responsible for the delivery of CRCs in Wales; Dorset, Devon and Cornwall; and Bristol, Gloucestershire, Somerset and Wiltshire.

=== CRC Service Rated as "Inadequate" ===
In November 2018, HM Inspectorate of Probation rated services of the Dorset, Devon and Cornwall CRC as "inadequate", the lowest possible rating. Before the report on this inspection was published, the Chief Inspector of Probation, Dame Glenys Stacey, advised the government that intervention was necessary, the first time she had taken this course of action.

Findings of the report includes:

- Staff were under-recording the number of riskier cases because of commercial pressures.
- The professional ethics of staff had been "compromised" because of financial imperatives.
- Workloads of some staff were "unconscionable".
- Sentence plans for offenders were being completed by staff, without them having met the offender.

In the report on the Dorset, Devon and Cornwall CRC, the Chief Inspector Dame Glenys Stacy wrote:

"The professional ethos of probation has buckled under the strain of the commercial pressures put upon it here, and it must be restored urgently".

She added:

"...effort is focused disproportionately on reducing the risk of any further contractual (financial) penalty. For some professional staff, workloads are unconscionable. Most seriously, we have found professional ethics compromised and immutable lines crossed because of business imperatives."

== Allegations of fraud ==
In May 2011 a former auditor of Working Links claimed that the level of fraud at Working Links escalated to "a farcical situation" and was "endemic" but that he faced a "stonewall" from managers. Mr Hutchinson said he had encountered "a multi-billion-pound scandal", after working for Working Links and A4e in the welfare-to-work industry. Working Links said: "We firmly reject any assertion of widespread fraud within our business." The Department for Work and Pensions ruled that all allegations had been investigated at the time and no further action was needed.

== See also ==
- Transforming Rehabilitation
