= List of British organisations who have participated in workfare programmes =

This article lists British companies and charitable organisations that have participated in the British government's workfare programmes whereby individuals must work in return for unemployment benefits. Note that several companies, charities, public sector and third sector organisations have pulled out of workfare schemes as a result of negative publicity and as such inclusion on this list does not mean that a company currently uses workfare. Those involved in a specific version of workfare where this is known, have it listed after their names, while those known to have withdrawn altogether as of May 2019, are denoted by Withdrawn.

Help to Work was discontinued in stages in 2016 and 2017. "Traineeships" targeted unemployed young people.

== Freedom of Information challenge ==
Attempts to get the names of companies and charities who have participated in workfare have been the subject of a lengthy legal battle. In May 2013 the DWP lost a first tier tribunal case where it was ruled that the names of those who have participated in Mandatory Work Activity schemes should be released. The fourth and final Appeal lodged by the DWP was thrown out in July 2016 and the lists of "placement providers" for the now defunct scheme Mandatory Work Activity revealed the names of 534 organisations.

== Boycott Workfare list ==
The anti-workfare organisation Boycott Workfare has compiled its own list of organisations that are known to have participated in DWP workfare schemes. "Defunct" denotes that a company has been liquidated and no longer exists having gone bankrupt and been dissolved, this includes "social enterprises" which are still commercial money-making enterprises.

- 4 Acres
- A19 Skills (Swansea)
- Aberdeen Foyer - involved with Help to Work
- A4e
- The AA
- Abney Park Cemetery
- Accident Helpline
- Acorns Children's Hospice Charity Shop (Worcester) - Mandatory Work Activity
- Acorn Computer Recycling - defunct
- Acorn Training (East Midlands) - G4S subcontractor in Help to Work
- Acorn Training Consultants (East Midlands) - G4S subcontractor in Help to Work
- Action for Blind People - Work Programme
- A-Class Football Foundation
- ACT Learnabout (Wales) - G4S subcontractor in Help to Work
- Acumen (North East) - G4S subcontractor in Help to Work
- Affinity Sutton
- Age UK - withdrew from Mandatory Work Activity in 2012, but remain involved with other variants of workfare including Traineeships; have stated that they will not be participants in Help to Work
- AIM2LEARN
- Air Hop Bristol
- All Waste Recycling & Hire Ltd - defunct
- Alpha Stream - defunct
- Armada Tube and Steel - defunct
- Anglo-Chinese Arts Council
- Anna's Charity - defunct
- Angus College - Mandatory Work Activity
- Ardgour Riding Centre (Kilmalieu, Inverness)
- Arabic Career Development
- Argos - withdrawn
- Argyle & Bute Council - Mandatory Work Activity
- AS Care (Leicester) - involved with Traineeships
- Assist Recruitment - defunct
- Asda
- Asian Star Community Radio LTD
- Aspire Foundation
- Atlas Washrooms Systems
- ATN Adult Training Network (East London) - G4S subcontractor
- ATS
- Avanta - Mandatory Work Activity
- Avanta Enterprise Ltd - Mandatory Work Activity
- Awaiting Eyes Foundation (London) - defunct
- Babington (East Midlands) - involved with Help to Work
- Balsall Heath Forum - involved with Help to Work
- BAM Facility Management
- Barakah Mini Market - defunct
- Barnardos - Mandatory Work Activity, claim to no longer be involved with Help to Work
- Barnsley Hospice
- Bath Antiques
- Beaumont Leys Primary School (Leicester) - involved with Traineeships the latest variant of workfare targeting unemployed people
- Beaumont Leys & Stocking Farm Sure Start Children's Centre (Leicester) - involved with Traineeships
- Bedesworld
- BEST, Business Employment Training Services Ltd (Yorkshire & Humber) - Mandatory Work Activity
- Bellcome Call Centre - defunct
- Bethany Training - subcontractor in Help to Work
- Bexley Council (Resources Plus) - G4S subcontractor in Help to Work
- BHS (British Home Stores) - withdrawn
- Birmingham Community Development Scheme
- Blue Cross - withdrawn; have stated that they will not be participants in Help to Work
- Blue Arrow
- Bluebird Care
- B & M Stores - involved in Traineeships
- Bobath Children's Therapy Centre, Wales - subcontractor in Help to Work
- The Body Shop - withdrawn
- Booker Wholesale
- Books for Free (Basildon)- defunct
- Boots - withdrawn
- Bootstrap (Merseyside, Lancashire & Cumbria) - G4S subcontractor in Help to Work
- Bournemouth City Council
- Bowden Derra Care Home
- B&Q
- Brantano Footwear (Leicester) - defunct
- Bridge to Success - defunct
- Bristol Auto Electric
- British Heart Foundation - withdrew from Mandatory Work Activity and the Work Programme in 2012, but still involved in Work Experience variant of workfare as of 2014, and involved with other variants of workfare including Traineeships; have stated that they will not be participants in Help to Work
- Bromford Group (Wolverhampton) - withdrawn
- Broadway - formerly Work Programme subcontractors before merger with St Mungos resulted in the end of involvement, so now withdrawn
- BT
- Brothers of Charity Services England - involved with Help to Work
- BTCV - Mandatory Work Activity
- Building and Property Maintenance
- Bulky Bob's - withdrawn from Help to Work
- Burger King – withdrawn
- Burtons Biscuits (Edinburgh)
- Burton
- Business2Business Ltd - defunct
- Butlins Ltd - involved with Traineeships
- Byteback It Solutions Limited (Bristol) - withdrawn, had been involved in Help to Work
- Calico Group (Pennine Lancashire)
- Calderdale Council - involved with Traineeships
- Campbell Page UK
- Cancer Research UK - withdrew from Mandatory Work Activity and the Work Programme in 2012, but still involved in Work Experience as of 2014 and involved in Traineeships; have stated that they will not be participants in Help to Work
- Candyland formerly Tangerine Confectionery - Marks & Spencer supplier
- Care UK
- Carefree Kids
- Caremark
- Carillion (Kent) - defunct
- Carnegie Heritage Centre (Hull)
- Cartrefi Conwy - involved with Help to Work
- Cats Protection
- CCL North Recycling (Irvine)
- Carnegie College - Mandatory Work Activity
- Central Beds Council
- Centre for Design & Manufacture UK Ltd (London) - defunct
- CEX (Bristol)
- Child Dynamix (Hull)
- Children's Hospice (CHSW), (Trowbridge) - subcontractor in Help to Work
- Crystal Face (Bristol)
- City Furnishings and Auction House (Glasgow) - withdrawn from Help to Work
- Citizens Advice Bureau (CAB) - Work Programme
- City and Guilds
- City Furnishings (Glasgow) - defunct
- City West Housing Trust (Greater Manchester)
- Cineworld Cinemas
- Claverhouse Training (Scotland) - defunct
- Close Protection UK - defunct
- Cloybank (Falkirk)
- Clyde Valley Housing Association
- Cornwall Neighbourhoods for Change - withdrawn from the Work Programme
- Connect Community Trust (Scotland) - subcontractor in Help to Work
- Cornelly and District Development Trust (Wales) - subcontractor in Help to Work
- County Training (Shropshire)
- Cre-namic Security - defunct
- Crerar Hotels
- Crest Co-operative (Wales) - subcontractor in Help to Work
- Crossfold Electrical
- Currys-PC World - involved in Traineeships
- Cygnus Consulting Limited (East Midlands) - defunct
- Daisy Chain Project (Stockton-on-Tees)
- Daylight
- DB Accident Repair (Kent)
- DC Cleaning (Sussex)
- Deaf Hub (Dundee) - subcontractor in Help to Work
- Debenhams
- The RAC (Bristol)
- DebRA - subcontractor in Help to Work
- de Poel Community (Knutsford, Cheshire)
- Derbyshire & Nottinghamshire Chamber of Commerce - G4S subcontractor in Help to Work
- Diamond Glass Medway (Kent)
- DiSC Ltd, Developing initiatives Supporting Communities (North East) - Mandatory Work Activity
- Divine Rescue - Mandatory Work Activity
- Domus Healthcare
- Doreen Hair Fashion Salon
- Dorothy Perkins
- Dove House Hospice (Hull and East Riding) - involved with Help to Work
- Drayton Manor
- Dulwich Hamlet FC - withdrawn
- Dunelm Mill
- Durham YFC
- each (East Anglia Children's Hospice) - 'Community Work Placements'
- e-achieve - defunct
- eco-actif - defunct
- ellenor charity (North & West Kent and Bexley)
- Emmaus (Hull)
- Employment Related Services Association (ERSA)
- Enterprise Durham Partnership
- Environmental Concern Co Ltd (Birmingham) - subcontractor in Help to Work
- Envirostream - defunct
- Escape Family Support (North East) - involved with Help to Work
- esg Holdings Ltd (West Midlands) - Mandatory Work Activity
- Essential Rubber
- Evans
- Experts in Media (Belfast) - defunct
- Extra Time (Portslade)
- Eyemouth Golf Club (Eyemouth, Scotland)
- Fair Training & Recruitment Solutions Ltd - defunct
- FARA Charity Shops
- FareShare (Newcastle) - involved with 'Community Work Placements'
- Faith Regen (East London)
- Finsbury Park Business Forum
- Finsbury and Clerkenwell Volunteers
- FlutterBuys
- First 4 Epos (Oldham) - defunct
- First4Skills - defunct
- FNTC Training & Consultancy - defunct
- Focus Housing, Care, & Training Consultants Limited (Kent) - defunct
- Fontaine Vinery (Guernsey) - subcontractor in Help to Work
- Fort Amherst (Chatham) - subcontractor in Help to Work
- FP Mailing (City) Ltd - defunct
- Framework (Nottingham) - G4S subcontractor in Help to Work
- French Oven Bakery (Newcastle upon Tyne)
- F&S Interiors (Kent) - defunct
- Furniture Matters (Morcambe)
- Furniture Now (East Sussex) - 'Community Work Placements'
- Furniture Plus (Kirkcaldy) - defunct
- Furniture Revival (Rhymney)
- Fusion Housing (Kirklees)
- Gap Personnel
- Genesis Housing Association - subcontractor in Help to Work
- The Genesis Trust (Bath) - subcontractor in Help to Work
- Genistar
- Gingerbread
- Giroscope (Hull)
- Glasgow Caring City - withdrawn from Help to Work
- Global Placement Provider Ltd - defunct
- Gnaw Chocolate (Norwich)
- Goodwill Solutions (Northampton)
- Gorgie City Farm
- The Grand Venue (Clitheroe)
- Green Futures (Grimsby) - subcontractor in Help to Work
- Greggs the Bakers - Work Experience
- Grosvenor Casinos (Brighton)
- grow: Economic Regeneration & Development, Hull City Council - Mandatory Work Activity
- Grow Enterprise Wales (RCT Homes) - subcontractor in Help to Work - defunct
- Go Response (Kent)
- Greenwich & Bexley Hospice
- Grimsby Garden Centre
- Groundwork - Mandatory Work Activity, also a "Prime" provider of Help to Work
- Guinea Enviro (Glasgow) - subcontractor in Help to Work - defunct
- GWK Shop - defunct
- Hannah's (Dame Hannah Rogers Trust) (Devon)
- Hairways
- HANA (Humber All Nations Alliance)
- Handel House Museum
- Harriots
- Hardens Cafe
- Haringey Voluntary Services
- Harlow and District Chamber of Commerce
- Haven House Children's Hospice
- Hastings & Rother Voluntary Association for the Blind
- Helen & Douglas House Hospice (Maidenhead)
- HERIB, Hull and East Riding Institute for the Blind - involved with Help to Work
- Helena Partnerships
- HEY Mind (Hull)
- HMRC
- HMV - withdrawn
- Highbury New Park Day Centre
- Highgate Newtown Community Centre
- Hilton Hotels
- Hillhead Pets Corner (Kilbirnie)
- Holiday Inn - claimed to have withdrawn in 2012, but remain involved with Sector-Based Work Academies as of 2014
- Holland & Barrett - withdrawn
- Homebase - withdrawn
- Homes for Haringey - withdrawn from the Work Programme
- Home-Start
- Homes for Islington
- Hornsey School for Girls
- Hospices of Hope - withdrawn from Help to Work
- House of Hope Recycling Village (East Kilbride)
- The Hull Council for Disabled People - involved with Help to Work
- Hull Food Bank
- Hull HARP, Homeless and Rootless Project - involved with Help to Work
- Iceland - involved with Traineeships
- Ideal Mobile Solutions - defunct
- ICM (Global) - defunct
- IKEA - involved with Traineeships
- Ingeus UK - Mandatory Work Activity
- Inspire 2 Independence Ltd (i2i) - defunct
- Intelling
- Interserve Doncaster - Work Programme
- Invicta Foundation - withdrawn, had been involved with Help to Work
- Ironworks (Scotland) - involved with Help to Work
- Isabel Hospice (Hertfordshire)
- Ixion (West London; East London) - G4S subcontractor in Help to Work
- JTJ Workplace Solutions - defunct
- Jacob's Well (Hull)
- JA Glover – (Kent)
- Jessup Electrical Wholesale Ltd (Kent)
- JJ Vickers & Sons Ltd (Kent) - defunct
- JH Cancer Support (Warrington, Cheshire)
- JHP Group Ltd (Scotland) - Mandatory Work Activity - defunct
- JJ Training (North East Yorkshire & Humber) - G4S subcontractor in Help to Work - defunct
- Job Point (Recruitment) Limited - defunct
- Jurys Inn
- Keech Hospice (Beds, Herts and Milton Keynes)
- Kennedy Scott
- Kent Flooring Supplies (Kent)
- Kent Space – (Kent)
- KEMP Hospice (Kidderminster, Worcestershire)
- KFR Kennet Furniture Refurbiz (Devizes, Wiltshire)
- Kidney Research UK
- Kirkwood Hospice (Huddersfield)
- Kingston Community Furniture
- Kingdom Security
- Kiln Park
- Kiltro (UK) Ltd - defunct
- Knutsford Town Council
- K-10
- Lakelands Hospice (Corby)
- LAMH Recycle Ltd (Motherwell) - withdrawn from Help to Work
- Learn About (Wales) - subcontractor in Help to Work
- Learn Direct - Mandatory Work Activity, also a "Prime" provider for Help to Work, and a G4S subcontractor for East Midlands, Merseyside, Lancashire & Cumbria, and Hampshire, Thames Valley & Isle of Wight
- Leightec Solutions - defunct
- Lincoln Hartford Solicitors
- Life Skills Central Ltd (Scotland) - Mandatory Work Activity
- Light Project International
- Livability
- Liverpool Plastics - defunct
- Loaves "n" Fishes (West Midlands) - Mandatory Work Activity
- London Field Primary School
- Longhill Link Up Trust (Hull)
- Lonsdale Community Centre (Hull)
- Lloyds Bank – General Insurance
- Lowestoft Town FC
- Lower Morden Equestrian Centre
- Luton Borough Council
- Luton Culture
- Macdonald Hotels (Scotland) - 'Traineeships'
- Major Energy
- MAS Landscapes
- Marie Curie - withdrawn
- Marks & Spencer
- Marlborough House Mosque & Community Centre (Stockton on Tees) - Mandatory Work Activity
- Marriott Hotels (Glasgow) - involved in Traineeships; have stated that they will not be participants in Help to Work
- Martin House Hospice - involved with Help to Work
- Maplin - withdrawn
- Matalan
- Matrix Complex
- Maxwell Centre (Dundee) - subcontractor in Help to Work
- Mayhem Paintball
- McDonald's
- Mercy in Action (Bath, Bucks and Beds)
- McSence (Scotland) - involved with Help to Work
- Medex Accident Assistance Ltd - defunct
- Medout
- Medway Council
- Medway Tyres (Kent)
- Mencap - Mandatory Work Activity; but have stated that they will not be participants in Help to Work
- Melin Homes (South East Wales)
- Michael Ambrose (Leicester) - involved with Traineeships
- Merson Signs
- Microcom Training Ltd (Scotland) - defunct
- Midcounties Co-operative - subcontractor in Help to Work
- Midlands Air Ambulance
- Mid-Lin Day Care Centre (Dundee) - subcontractor in Help to Work
- Mind - withdrew from Mandatory Work Activity in 2012, but remain involved with the Work Programme as of 2014; have stated that they will not be participants in Help to Work
- Migrants Resource Centre
- Mitie Foundation
- Montem Primary School
- The Mustard Tree (Manchester) - withdrawn from Mandatory Work Activity
- MTL Group - defunct
- M-Valeting Ltd (King's Lynn) - involved with Traineeships - defunct
- My Claim Solved
- MS Society
- Nandos (Edinburgh)
- National Federation of Retail Newsagents (NFRN)
- National Hereditary Breast Cancer (Hull) - subcontractor in Help to Work
- Nationwide Event Support
- NAViGO Health and Social Care CIC (Grimsby) - Mandatory Work Activity and Sector-Based Work Academies
- Newham Council
- Newhaven Community Development
- Nico Manufacturing
- Nightingale House (Wrexham)
- Norfolk Trucks
- North Doncaster Development Trust (NDDT) - Work Programme
- North London Hospice - withdrawn from Help to Work; charity shops accepting "Community Work Placements" as of 2014
- Northumberland County Council - Mandatory Work Activity
- North Yorkshire Learning Consortium - Mandatory Work Activity
- North Wales Training - subcontractor in Help to Work
- Nova New Opportunities (Brighton)
- 99p - withdrawn
- OAS (Oxfordshire Animal Sanctuary)
- Ocado
- Our Lady Kentish Town
- Octavia Foundation (London) - involved in 'Community Work Placements'
- Oldfield Consultancy Ltd - defunct
- Olympic Glass (Kent)
- Omega Therapies CIC - defunct
- Omnico Plastics Ltd (Kent)
- 1'O Clock Club Barnsbury
- One World Shop (Hull)
- Outfit
- Our Lady Help of Christians (Farnborough)
- Oxfam - withdrawn
- Oxgangs Neighborhood Centre (Edinburgh) - involved with Help to Work
- Papworth Trust - withdrawn from Mandatory Work Activity
- Park Nature Reserve
- Payless (Kent) - defunct
- Pastures New (Littleborough) - involved with Help to Work
- PATCH (Pembrokeshire Action To Combat Hardship) - involved with Help to Work
- PDSA - withdrawn; have also stated that they will not be participants in Help to Work
- Peacocks
- Pera Training (Leicester) - involved in Traineeships
- People Know How (Edinburgh)
- Peter Bedford Housing Association
- PHA Recruitment Solutions - defunct
- Phoenix Enterprises (Yorkshire and the Humber) - subcontractor in Help to Work
- Pinnacle People - Mandatory Work Activity; also G4S subcontractor in Help to Work in East Midlands, West London, and East London
- Pizza Hut (Kent and Surrey) - withdrawn
- Pioneer Social Enterprise Ltd (Doncaster) - subcontractor in Help to Work
- Pilkington Glass
- Plumbase (Kent)
- Placement Provider Partners (Yorkshire & Humber) - Mandatory Work Activity
- Plymouth County Council - involved with Help to Work
- Salisbury Mews Haringes
- Sprigboard UK
- Pramp
- Poppies Limited
- Porchlight (Kent) - withdrawn
- Portsmouth Council - subcontractor in Help to Work
- Poundland - involved with the Work Programme, Sector-Based Work Academies, and Traineeships
- Poundworld Retail
- Poundstretcher
- PPDG (Pertemps People Development Group) - G4S subcontractor in Help to Work
- Premier Inn
- Primark
- Process Plant Services Ltd (Kent)
- Pulse CIC
- Pulteneytown Peoples Project (Scotland) - involved with Help to Work
- Quality Savers
- Radha-Krishna Temple
- Radisson Edwardian - involved in Traineeships
- Radecal Signs (Washington, Tyne and Wear) - subcontractor in Help to Work
- The Range
- Randstad - withdrawn
- Rathbone Training - defunct
- RBLI
- Ready2Work
- Rebound Bookshop (Blackburn) - involved with Help to Work
- Recycle Force
- Recyke-a-bike
- Recycling Unlimited (Hull) - subcontractor in Help to Work
- Red Cross - 'Traineeships'
- Refurb project
- Regency Guillotine (Kent)
- Rehab JobFit (South West) - Mandatory Work Activity
- Relate
- Rerun (Hull)
- Restore Community Project
- Revive Leeds - involved with Help to Work
- Revive, The Green House (Liverpool) - involved with Help to Work
- Richmond Fellowship - withdrawn
- rinascente (Stockport) - subcontractor in Help to Work
- River Kids (Livingstone) - subcontractor in Help to Work
- RNIB - Mandatory Work Activity, but have stated that they will not be participants in Help to Work
- Robert Blaire Primary School
- The Rock Foundation (Grimsby) - subcontractor in Help to Work
- Romney Resource (Kent)
- Room 2 (Kirkcaldy) - subcontractor in Help to Work
- Rotherham Council
- Rowcroft Hospice (Torquay) - subcontractor in Help to Work
- Royal Borough of Windsor and Maidenhead
- Royal Mail
- RNR Performance Cars (Kent)
- RPQ Inns Ltd – The Grapes Hotels - defunct
- RSPCA - Mandatory Work Activity and are involved in Traineeships
- St Andrew's Children's Hospice (Hull) - withdrawn from "Community Work Placements" part of Help to Work
- St Ann's Hospice, Manchester - involved with Help to Work
- Saffron Acres Project
- Sage UK
- Sainsbury's - withdrawn from earlier versions of workfare, but now involved with Traineeships
- Saint Francis Hospice (Havering-atte-Bower, Romford, Essex)
- St Benedict's Hospice (Sunderland) - involved with Help to Work
- St Davids Hospice (Wales) - involved with Help to Work
- St Mungos - Broadway - withdrawn from the Work Programme
- St Mungos - withdrawn; have also stated that they will not be participants in Help to Work
- St Peters Hospice (Bristol)
- St Luke's Hospice (Plymouth)
- St Mary's Horse Refuge (Essex) - subcontractor in Help to Work
- St Oswald's Hospice shops (Newcastle upon Tyne)
- St Richard's Hospice (Worcestershire) - subcontractor in Help to Work
- St Vincents Hospice (Howwood, Renfrewshire) - Mandatory Work Activity
- St Vincent de Paul
- St Werburghs City Farm, Bristol - withdrawn from Mandatory Work Activity
- Salvation Army - Mandatory Work Activity, but have stated that they will not be participants in Help to Work
- Sarina Russo Job Action - involved with Help to Work
- Savers - Sector-Based Work Academies
- Scarborough Council - withdrawn
- Scope - withdrew from Mandatory Work Activity and the Work Programme in 2012, but remain involved with Work Experience as of 2014
- Scottish Wildlife Trust - involved with Help to Work
- Scout Enterprises
- Sector Solutions (Yorkshire & Humber) - Mandatory Work Activity - defunct
- Sedgemoor Furniture Store (Bridgwater, Somerset) - involved with Help to Work
- Seetec - Mandatory Work Activity
- Select Sandwich & Coffee Co - defunct
- Sense - withdrew from Mandatory Work Activity in 2012, but remain involved with other variants of workfare as of 2014; have stated that they will not be participants in Help to Work
- Serco
- Servest
- Shaw Trust - Mandatory Work Activity
- Shelter - withdrawn
- Shettleston Housing Association (Glasgow) - 'Community Work Placements'
- SHOC Slough Homeless
- Shoe Zone - withdrew from earlier versions of workfare, but now involved with Traineeships
- Shropshire Council - Mandatory Work Activity
- Square Orange Associates - defunct
- Signs & Imaging Ltd - defunct
- Simply Accountable - defunct
- Single Homeless Project (SHP) - withdrawn
- Sixhills Aquatics - defunct
- Slough Library
- Slough Furniture Project
- Southend Storehouse - defunct
- Southern Membranes Ltd (Kent) - defunct
- Southern Metal Services (Kent)
- Southern Roofing & Building Supplies (Kent)
- South West Laundry
- South Yorkshire Chambers of Commerce (Doncaster Chamber of Commerce) - Work Programme
- Sports Traider - defunct
- Spyglass & Kettle pub (Bournemouth)
- Stag Treorchy
- Starter Packs Magpie Tribe, Magpie's Eye Gallery, and The Magpie's Nest (Glasgow) - withdrawn from Help to Work
- St. John's Street Library/Age Concern
- St Luke's Hospice Shops
- St Mary Pre-School
- Stephens Fresh Food (Kent)
- Store Twenty One - defunct
- Stranraer Millennium Centre - Help to Work
- Strategic Pro Office, Islington
- Studio 28 Light and Design
- Sunnyside Ecology Centre
- Storie Argyll Ltd
- Subway (Newcastle)
- Sue Ryder - withdrawn, but involved in Traineeships; have stated that they will not be participants in Help to Work
- Sumo Waste (Glasgow) - involved with Help to Work
- Sunderland North Community Business Centre - Mandatory Work Activity
- Superdrug - withdrawn
- Swan Lifeline (Windsor)
- Tai Calon Community Housing (Blaenau Gwent) - involved with Help to Work
- Tanya's Courage Trust - Supporting Young People with Cancer (Penzance) - Mandatory Work Activity
- TAS Ltd (West London) - G4S subcontractor in Help to Work
- Tate Recruitment
- TBG Learning
- Tesco - involved with "Work Experience" workfare variant, and Traineeships
- Tenovus Cancer Care (Cardiff)
- THAG (Tesside Homeless Action Group)
- Think 3E Ltd - defunct
- Thorpes Hub Ltd (Hull) - defunct
- Thorn International UK Limited (Walsall) - defunct
- Thornton Manor (Cheshire)
- TCHC
- Timbermills
- TK Maxx - claimed to have withdrawn from workfare in January 2012, but involved in Sector-Based Work Academies as of 2014
- Toni & Guy
- Topman
- Topshop
- The Children's Society - withdrew from Mandatory Work Activity in 2012, but remain involved with other versions of workfare as of 2014; have stated that they will not be participants in Help to Work
- The Crossings (Hull)
- The Conservation Volunteers (TCV) - Mandatory Work Activity, but have stated that they will not be participants in Help to Work
- The Lennox Partnership (Scotland) - Mandatory Work Activity
- The Lettings Co (Leicester) - involved with "Traineeships"
- The Princes's Trust - heavily involved in M&S's "branded" version of the "Work Experience" version of workfare aimed at young people; previously known to be a Work Programme sub-contractor
- The Tell Organisation (Scotland) - Mandatory Work Activity
- The Work Company (Hull) - G4S subcontractor in Help to Work
- The Wishing Well Project Jubilee Centre (Crewe) - Mandatory Work Activity
- Timpsons
- Tiny Tots Nursery/HG Comm Centre
- TMF Logistics (West Bromwich) - defunct
- Tomorrow's People - Mandatory Work Activity - defunct
- Town and Country Cleaners (Kent)
- Trackwork Installations Limited- defunct
- Travelodge
- TRAC (The Recyclyed Assets Company) (Portsmouth) - involved with Help to Work
- TRAID - withdrawn from Help to Work
- Triage (Scotland)
- Twin Valley Homes
- Two Sisters Food Group (2SFG) (Leicester and Nottingham)
- Ty Hafan Charity Shop (Wales) - withdrawn from Help to Work
- Urban Futures (East London) - defunct
- Vertegen Recycling (Wirral) - defunct'
- Virgin Media - involved with Traineeships
- Virgin Trains - defunct
- The Vine Project (Surrey) - Mandatory Work Activity - defunct
- Volunteer Centre Hammersmith
- Vulcan Centre for Sporting Excellence Ltd (Hull) - defunct
- Wakefield & District Health & Community Support Ltd (WDHC)
- Waldorf College (Stroud) - involved with Help to Work
- Wallis
- Waste Savers (Newport) - involved with Help to Work
- Waterstones - withdrawn
- WD Close & Sons
- WEA - withdrawn from the Work Programme
- Westward Pathfinder - defunct
- Workers' Educational Association, Scotland - withdrawn from the Work Programme
- WEPRE Villa Homecare
- West London Reuse Centre (Shepherds Bush Housing Association)
- Westmanor Property Services (Leicester) - involved with Traineeships
- Westminster Volunteer Centre
- Westra Boarding Kennels (Dinas Powis, Vale of Glamorgan) - subcontractor in Help to Work
- Welfare To Work Systems Ltd - defunct
- Westvic Enamellers (Kent)
- Wetherspoons
- WH Smith
- Whitehead Ross (Wales) - defunct
- Whittington Hospital
- Whittingtons
- William Frost Gardening
- Wilkinsons
- WISE Ability - Work Programme
- World of Pets (Grimsby)
- The Work Company (Work Solutions)
- Workpays (East Midlands)
- W&S Waste Management & Recycling Ltd (London) - defunct
- Working Links - defunct
- Work Solutions (Merseyside, Lancashire & Cumbria; and North East Yorkshire & Humber)
- The Works
- Wyeth Security Services
- YMCA - Mandatory Work Activity; have stated that they will not be participants in Help to Work, but involved in Traineeships
- Yorkshire Linen Company
