= Institute of Employability Professionals =

UK professional association

The Institute of Employability Professionals (IEP) is the professional association for the employability profession. The organisation was founded in 2011, and works to support the continued professional development (CPD) of front-line employability staff.

Since the launch of the Focus on the Frontline Programme, the IEP has focused on primarily supporting those who work directly with jobseekers as well as front-staff in organisations who provide employment support, such as charities.

It is headquartered at Elizabeth House in Waterloo, London. Scott Parkin is the current Director of the IEP.

== Individual Membership ==
=== Membership ===
Membership of the Institute consists of individuals working across the employability, policy (employment related) and skills sector including; job advisers (such as from Jobcentre Plus), operations managers, academics, policy advisers, professional trainers or independent business coaches. In addition to those from Jobcentre Plus, many members have or had some involvement with the Work Programme (succeeded by the Work and Health Programme), Work Choice or the Department for Work and Pensions.

=== Requirements and grades ===
Becoming a member of the Institute of Employability Professionals allows an individual to use letters after their name, to signify their membership within and outside of the employability sector. Membership for both Associates and Members is priced at £52, whilst fellows pay £200.

The membership grades of the IEP are as follows: Associate (AIEP) There are no specific entry requirements for Associate Membership, although it is expected that applicants would have a connection with the sector, for example, through their work, a course of study or learning programme. Associates usually have at least one year's relevant employability experience.

Member (MIEP) Full membership is available to individuals who can demonstrate that they have had a minimum of three years of relevant experience and can provide a reference confirming that experience from a manager or client stating that they have delivered to a good standard and achieved the required standards for their post.

Full Members must meet the requirements of Continuing Professional Development set out by IEPs Standards and Qualifications Committee from time to time.

Fellow (FIEP) Fellowship is available to individuals who are able to demonstrate both a significant level of experience and personal commitment plus evidence of contribution to the employment related services sector as demonstrated by:

- Involvement in the successful management of employability services at a senior level within the employment services or a related sector
- Participation/support for external activities that promote the work of the sector and its value to society
- Capacity to play a role in advancing/promoting the sector
- Intention to maintain and develop their Continued Professional Development (CPD)
- Intention to promote and support the development of individual IEP members.

Applicants for Fellowship must supply a current CV and the names of two referees who are able to confirm their experience and contribution to the employment related services sector. Fellowship applications are approved at the discretion of IEP's Membership and Nominations Committee Fellowship sub group.

== Corporate Affiliates ==
In addition to Individual membership, the Institute works with multiple employability providers to support their frontline staff with resources and CPD training.

The current list of Corporate Affiliates of the IEP includes:

- APM
- Bootstrap
- Campbell Page
- Trust City South Manchester Trust
- Cognisoft
- Deaf Umbrella
- Emsi
- Epping Forest College
- FutureWorks (Pembrokeshire County Council)
- Iconi
- Kennedy Scott
- One Housing
- Papworth Trust
- Pluss
- Prospects Services
- RBLI
- Rebah JobFit
- Remploy
- Royal Association for Deaf people
- Salvation Army Employment Plus
- Seetec
- Serco
- Shaw Trust
- Skillsmatch (Tower Hamlets Council)
- Standguide Group
- Tomorrow's People
- WISEAbility
- Working Links
