= Community Action Programme =

Workfare scheme in the UK

The Community Action Programme (CAP) also known as Support for the very long-term unemployed is a workfare programme in the United Kingdom whereby long-term unemployed people who have been unemployed for over three years must work for their benefits for six months or have them removed. It was piloted in six areas and then expanded in autumn 2012.

== Criticism ==
The Centre for Economic and Social Inclusion thinktank have argued that rolling out the CAP scheme could be an "expensive mistake". David Simmons of the CESI has argued that "We have to be careful about a one size fits all solution for the very long-term unemployed by requiring them to work for their benefits."

== See also ==
- Boycott Workfare
- Forced labour
- Workfare in the United Kingdom
