= Millie Banerjee =

British businessperson (born 1946)

Millie Banerjee CBE
- Born: Urmila Ray-Chaudhuri; 30 June 1946 (age 80); Kolkata, India
- Education: University College London; University of North London
- Occupations: Academic, businessperson

Urmila "Millie" Banerjee, CBE (née Ray-Chaudhuri; born 30 June 1946) is a British businessperson who has held a number of public appointments.

== Career ==
Banerjee obtained a BSc in zoology at University College London and then a DMS from the Polytechnic of North London (now the University of North London). In 1970, she started working for Post Office Telecommunications, initially as an operational manager and rising to Director level from 1990 to 1995 in what was now BT. Banerjee then transferred to ICO Global Communications, serving as Vice-President of Programme Management from 1995 to 1997, then Executive vice-President of Operations until 2000.

== Public appointments ==
Banerjee has extensive board experience, having served as a non-executive director or board member for a number of public sector-related organisations:

Banerjee's government posts include the Prison Service Agency (1990–1995), the Cabinet Office between 1999 and 2005, the Nurses and Allied Professions Pay Review Board (1999–2002), Channel 4 from 2000 to 2002, the Judicial Appointments Commission (2001–05), and the Strategic Rail Authority, (2002–05), and as Chairman of Postwatch from 2005 to 2008 when it was merged into Consumer Focus, and of the Postal Services Commission in 2011 until it was dissolved and merged into Ofcom, and as a Member of Ofcom itself from 2002 to 2012.

Academic and vocational institutions with which Banerjee has been involved include being Governor of London South Bank University from 1993 to 1998, as Director of Focus Central London (1997–2000) and of the Sector Skills Development Agency (2001–04), as a Member of the Advisory Board to the Tanaka Business School at Imperial College London from 2003 to 2007, and as a Trustee (and latterly chairman) of the Carnegie United Kingdom Trust (2001–2007). She was Chair of the British Transport Police Authority from 2008 to 2015

Banerjee is currently a Governor of the Peabody Trust since 2008, as a Member of Newham Primary Care Trust (now NHS East London and the City) since 2009, as Chair of Working Links since 2010 and as Chair of the Nominet Trust since 2012.

Banerjee was the chair of NHS Blood and Transplant between 2017 and 2021. She resigned in August 2021 stating that it was to focus on her other role as chair of the South West London Health and Care Partnership. She resigned from the latter role in August 2022 following the release of a leaked recording of her allegedly making "several disparaging comments" about employees at NHS Blood and Transplant in June 2020.

Banerjee was appointed a Commander of the Order of the British Empire (CBE) in the Queen's Birthday Honours list in 2002 for her work supporting Civil Service reform, and as High Sheriff of Greater London for 2012/13.

== Positions held ==
Government offices
Preceded by Peter Carr	Chairman of Postwatch; 2005–2008	Organisation merged into Consumer Focus
Preceded by Nigel Stapleton	Chairman of the Postal Services Commission; 2011	Commission merged into Ofcom
Police appointments
Preceded by Sir Alistair Graham	Chairman of the British Transport Police Authority; 2008–2015	Succeeded by Esther McVey
Honorary titles
Preceded by Lady Elizabeth Arnold	High Sheriff of Greater London; 2012	Succeeded by David Fraser Christopher Jones
Non-profit organization positions
Preceded by Keith Faulkner CBE	Chair of Working Links; 2010–	Incumbent
Other offices
Preceded by John Pattullo OBE	Chair of NHS Blood and Transplant; 2017–2021	Succeeded by John Pattullo OBE
