= Emma Harrison =

Emma Harrison may refer to:

- Emma Harrison (actress), New Zealand actress
- Emma Harrison (businesswoman), English entrepreneur
- Emma Harrison (politician), Canadian politician
