= IEP =

IEP may refer to:

== Science and technology ==
- Immunoelectrophoresis, biochemistry method
- Inclusion–exclusion principle, in the mathematics branch of combinatorics
- Integrated electric propulsion, in marine propulsion
- Isoelectric point, the pH where a molecule is electrically neutral

== Education and research ==
- Individualized Education Program, in the United States, for children with disabilities
- Instituts d'études politiques (Institutes of Political Studies), higher education institutions in France
- Institute for Economics and Peace, a think tank
- Institute for European Politics, a Berlin research centre
- Institute for Political Studies – Catholic University of Portugal (Portuguese: Instituto de Estudos Políticos)
- Internet Encyclopedia of Philosophy

== Other uses ==
- Icahn Enterprises, an American conglomerate
- Independent Expert Panel, concerned with misconduct by members of the UK parliament
- Institute of Employability Professionals, a British professional association
- Intercity Express Programme, a British rail transport initiative
- Irish pound, the pre-euro currency of Ireland
