= Federation of Awarding Bodies =

The Federation of Awarding Bodies is the British trade association for awarding bodies and professional associations. The current chief executive is Rob Nitsch.

== History ==
It was founded in 2000.

== Function ==
It represents providers of technical vocational education qualifications, not providers of general academic qualifications such as A Levels and GCSEs.

== Structure ==
While the Federation has a mailing address in Grosvenor Square, London, the staff are home based. As of 2023, FAB has a small team of staff and a Board Chaired by Tim Bennett-Hart along with non-executive directors elected from its members. It represents over 150 members and holds two flagship conferences each year, one of which is dedicated to End Point Assessment (EPA), most commonly associated with apprenticeships.

== See also ==
- Association of Learning Providers
- Institute of Employability Professionals
- Institute for Learning
- TVET (Technical and Vocational Education and Training)
- UK Register of Learning Providers
