= A4e =

British welfare-to-work company

A4e Ltd
- Industry: Training
- Founded: 1991 to 2015
- Headquarters: Sheffield, United Kingdom
- Key people: Emma Harrison, Chairman until 24 February 2012
- Revenue: £145m
- Number of employees: 3,100+
- Website: mya4e.com

A4e (Action for Employment) was a for-profit, welfare-to-work company based in the United Kingdom. The company began in Sheffield in 1991 with the objective to provide redundant steelworkers with the training required to obtain new jobs.

They operated in five countries, but retained a significant presence in the UK where they worked with organisations in the public sector such as the Department for Work and Pensions.

In the wake of various controversies and criminal investigations, MPs Fiona Mactaggart and former Secretary of State for Work and Pensions Margaret Hodge urged the UK government to suspend contracts with A4e. In March 2012, following fraud allegations regarding an A4e contract, the Department for Work and Pensions began an independent audit of all its commercial relationships with A4e.

On 15 May 2012, Employment Minister Chris Grayling announced that the audits for the Work Programme, the New Enterprise Allowance programme and Mandatory Work Activity found no evidence of fraud in any of these contracts. However, while the team found no evidence of fraud, it identified weaknesses in A4e's internal controls on the Mandatory Work Activity contract in the South East and that this contract with A4e had been terminated, after deciding that continuing would pose 'too great a risk'.

In March 2015, six former employees received jail sentences for forging files in a scam that was said to have cost taxpayers almost £300,000. Four received suspended sentences.

Staffline later bought A4e before rebranding the new composite company "PeoplePlus".

== History ==
A4e was originally a Sheffield-based training company, putting unemployed steel workers through a 'getting-back-to-work' course. A4e was a company started by Emma Harrison's father and she joined the company after graduating in engineering.

After the Labour Party came to power in 1997, they introduced the back-to-work New Deal service for those on Jobseeker's Allowance, requiring claimants to attend vocational training or risk losing their benefit. In the mid-2000s, the government withdrew funding from Jobcentre Plus' vocational training programmes and redirected the funds to "back-to-work" agencies, such as the Sheffield-based company, A4e. A4e quickly became the largest provider of New Deal services in the UK and had contracts for the New Deal worth £80 million. When the New Deal was wound down in 2010, A4e was paid a share of £63 million in "termination fees".

A4e was awarded a contract for the Pathways to Work scheme in 2008, with a target to get 30 per cent of participants into employment. In February 2012, the Public Accounts Committee heard the success rate was 9 per cent. Committee Chair, Margaret Hodge, questioned why A4e had been awarded new contracts to deliver the Work Programme despite this "abysmal" performance. Conservative Committee member, Richard Bacon, expressed similar concerns, asking why A4e's "dreadful performance in one of the immediate predecessor programmes" had not been taken into account during tendering.

== TV appearances ==
In August 2009, A4e was featured in two episodes of Benefit Busters. Chairman, Emma Harrison, also appeared on Secret Millionaire.

== Present operations ==
According to The Times, 'A4e is a business consultancy that offers "to make millions from the unemployed by treating them as a commodity" to private and public companies.'

A4e bid for several large additional contracts from the UK government but later faced heavy criticism. Former Secretary of State for Work and Pensions, David Blunkett, an advocate of increased participation by firms like A4e in the welfare system also faced criticism for accepting a trip to South Africa from A4e whilst in government. This was in addition to the earnings of between £25,000 and £30,000 as an adviser, three years after leaving office.

In September 2011, A4e were awarded a £250,000 contract to advise the Prime Minister David Cameron's office on future privatisations. It will advise on how to design welfare contracts with private firms and getting value for money in contracting out.

A4e has been hired by the Cabinet Office to advise on the rules governing four experimental schemes aimed at families with unemployed parents living in Conservative-led authorities.

On 23 February 2012, Chairman Emma Harrison stepped down from her role as David Cameron's personal adviser on problem families, due to her firm being investigated over allegations of multiple fraud. The following day, she stepped down as chairman of A4e amid growing pressure over the company's behaviour.

On 9 March 2012, the Skills Funding Agency revealed A4e to be a preferred bidder for prison education contracts. On 13 March the SFA confirmed it had awarded A4e two such contracts, worth up to £30million. Margaret Hodge commented, "I find it astounding that, at a time when one Government department is investigating a company for systemic failures, another department is awarding the same company new contracts. You couldn't make it up."

On 11 September 2012, a Channel 4 investigation revealed that A4e had only found 4020 jobs that lasted over 3 months in the 10 months up to May 2012. At that time, they had approximately 115,000 compulsory attendees seeking new positions, leading to a cost £45 million to the taxpayer. Margaret Hodge, chairman of the Public Accounts Committee said the performance was "abysmal".

== International ==
A4e had its major international operation in Australia with smaller operations in France, Germany, Ireland, Israel (operating as Amin), Italy, Poland, South Africa and India.

They opened in Australia during 2009 after winning Job Services Australia contracts from the Australian Government in Sydney and Gunnedah. The Government at the time was accused by the Sydney Morning Herald of a conflict of interest in awarding contracts to A4e due to links back to the UK and Emma Harrison.

== Criticism from charities ==
In 2008, refugee and asylum charities criticised A4e for asking them to work as its unpaid partners.

Farrukh Husain, director of the Migrants Resource Centre, accused A4e of "gross exploitation of the voluntary sector". He further commented, "A4e must think the voluntary sector is naive to simply wish to sign up to a relationship that delivers little in return for voluntary organisations and fattens up the profits of A4e."

Maurice Wren, director of Asylum Aid, expressed concern that A4e's actions could reduce the quality of bids for future Home Office contracts to help and support refugees: "This could get some organisations thinking, 'if we are to have any chance of getting a contract, we have to reduce our costs'. This means a poorer service for a very vulnerable client group."

== Loss of personal data ==
On 29 June 2010, A4e published a statement that an employee's laptop containing personal details of 24,269 people had been stolen. The employee's laptop was not encrypted, and was not recovered.

In November 2010, A4e were fined £60,000 by the Information Commissioner's Office for the loss of the laptop. Commissioner Christopher Graham, said that it, "...warranted nothing less than a monetary penalty as thousands of people's privacy was potentially compromised by the company's failure to take the simple step of encrypting the data".

In November 2011, A4e were taken to task by a Social Security Tribunal for halting the benefit payments of claimants who wished to be accompanied by representatives of their choice at meetings run by A4e. The report also states that members of A4e lied to the DWP in order to cut the benefits to claimants.

== Fraud investigations ==
=== Hull ===
On 28 June 2009, The Observer disclosed information regarding a fraud investigation into A4e which was instigated after the Department for Work and Pensions uncovered discrepancies in its "confirmation of employment" forms - discrepancies which centred upon the falsification of employers' signatures by a number of recruiters. One recruiter also made a fraudulent deal with a local temp agency.

A4e's official statement read,

'All the matters raised in the article are known to both A4e and the DWP and have been the subject of both an A4e investigation and a DWP led investigation. The A4e investigation revealed that whilst candidates had real job opportunities, these jobs did not meet the funding criteria being less than 13 weeks and 16 hours a week in duration. These investigations have resulted in the departure of both individuals from the company and the ceasing of all activity with the employment agency concerned.'

=== Teesside ===
Another case of signature forgery emerged on 6 March 2012. This took place while A4e was working for Redcar and Cleveland Council to help disadvantaged young people into education, training or employment. A Council inquiry found that learners' signatures had been forged to exaggerate the number of vulnerable people the project had reached. A4e was forced to withdraw from this part of the project.

Middlesbrough South and East Cleveland MP Tom Blenkinsop said: 'There needs to be a full investigation into this case. This is public money here, and this must be looked into to restore confidence into all regeneration projects carried out locally.'

=== Fraud investigations and jail sentences ===
In January 2012, four former employees of A4e were arrested on suspicion of fraud dating back to 2010. The alleged fraud was uncovered by an internal investigation by A4e. The two women, aged 28 and 49, and two men, aged 35 and 41 were bailed until mid-March.

On 22 February, The Guardian revealed that A4e had forced jobseekers to work unpaid in its own offices. They were investigated nine times by the Department for Work and Pensions since 2005, and were forced to repay public funds on five occasions after government investigations found 'irregularities'.

Emma Harrison resigned as chairman of A4e on 24 February 2012 amid criticism of 'improper' conflicts of interest regarding government contracts and allegations of fraud from whistleblowers.

On 26 February 2012, Thames Valley Police's Economic Crime Unit was revealed to be investigating the alleged theft by A4e staff of vouchers meant to help the unemployed back to work.

On 9 March 2012, the Department for Work and Pensions announced it had 'been made aware of an allegation of attempted fraud in relation to a Mandatory Work Activity contract with A4e'. It stated that it had begun an investigation into this allegation and also, as a result of the allegation, an 'independent audit of all our commercial relationships with A4e'.

On 22 March 2012, the BBC's Newsnight current affairs programme revealed that they had received a leaked document suggesting 'systemic fraud' at the company. The following day, Labour MP Margaret Hodge, who chairs the Commons Public Accounts Committee, called on the government to suspend its contracts with the jobs training agency.

On 3 April 2012, Exaro News revealed that A4e was being lined up for another major government contract despite being at the centre of a fraud investigation. Ministers made the company the preferred bidder to take over the sensitive Equality and Human Rights Commission (EHRC) helpline to advise people of their rights in discrimination cases.

On 20 April 2012, Police officers raided A4e's office in Slough after allegations were referred to them by the Department for Work and Pensions. A 33-year-old man was arrested and later bailed.

On 22 May 2012, Exaro News published leaked internal audit report which exposed 'potential fraud' at A4e. The report compiled by the audit and risk department examined a sample of 224 of the company's job placements and found that "potential fraudulent/irregular activity is not confined to one particular geographical area of the division and shows a potential systematic failure to mitigate the risk towards this behaviour at both an office and regional level". Auditors also discovered A4e sent an unemployed job-seeker to work in lap-dance club.

In March 2015, six former employees were jailed for forging files in a scam that was said to have cost taxpayers almost £300,000. Another four ex-members of staff received suspended prison sentences for what Judge Angela Morris said were ‘deceitful and unscrupulous’ practices. They had falsified employer details, time sheets and jobseekers' signatures to inflate the numbers they said they had helped into work.

=== Liam Byrne statement ===
Liam Byrne, Shadow Work and Pensions Secretary, responded to the DWP announcement of 9 March as follows,

"The time has come for full disclosure. With more questions over A4e and David Cameron's former family tsar Emma Harrison coming by the day, ministers must now come clean and tell the public exactly what they know and when they were informed about all allegations of fraud at A4e... the Government needs to make clear what new safeguards are being put in place to prevent this spreading any further, and with huge questions hanging over the entire Work Programme – and billions of pounds of public money at stake – ministers must publish all provider performance data immediately."

== Payments to Emma Harrison ==
Prime Minister David Cameron has been criticised after it was revealed that Harrison was paid an £8.6 million shares dividend in 2011, in addition to her £365,000 annual salary, with the majority of this funded by the taxpayer. Margaret Hodge described the dividend as "ripping off the State" and urged ministers to suspend all work with A4e.

MP Steve Barclay established that A4e takes a 12.5 per cent management fee on the half of its work that it passes on to local charities.

On 25 February 2012, it emerged that in addition to her £365,000 annual salary and £8.6m shares dividend, A4e also paid Harrison and her partner around £1.7m over two years for leasing properties, including their 20-bedroom stately home, to her own firm.

Private Eye has revealed that an additional £4m was shared between the other directors of A4e; in the case of Roy Newey, Hugh Sykes and Steve Boyfield, through Personal Service Companies, thereby avoiding the payment of National Insurance.

== Criticism from Fiona Mactaggart ==
On 2 March 2012, Fiona Mactaggart, Labour MP for Slough, revealed she had reported A4e to the national auditor on three occasions over the preceding two years, following complaints from her constituents. She stated that A4e "often provides poor service to unemployed people", "offered courses which had little worth and no recognition" and "are pursuing a policy which reduces the total number of jobs available".

== Allegations from former employees ==
On 8 March 2012, the Daily Mail reported allegations from Amy Rae, former team manager at A4e's Edinburgh office. She stated that A4e did not provide the training they were paid £950 to provide for each young person referred to their Community Task Force programmes by the JobCentre, instead sending them home. Rae blamed this on the failure of A4e management to authorise funding for the training, despite repeated requests. When inspectors from the Department for Work and Pensions arrived to inspect the training which was not taking place, Rae states she was instructed to deceive them by borrowing people from another A4e course in the same building and instructing them to lie, if questioned by the inspectors, about which course they were on.

A former employee from the Bradford office of A4e reports that A4e staff were sent to the stationery store Staples to buy their own rubber stamps with which to falsify Employment Verification Template forms, so A4e could defraud the Department for Work and Pensions.

A former employee from the Manchester office of A4e reports that pressure to meet quotas made fraud commonplace: 'Forging signatures used to go on all the time. You had no choice because it was made very clear to you that you would lose your job unless you reached your targets. If you couldn't get enough so-called "job outcomes", you would just have to forge one, so you would find a genuine employer's signature on another form and hold it up to the window under a blank one. It appeared everyone did it and nobody ever questioned it.'
