= Department for Work and Pensions v Information Commissioner =

Department for Work and Pensions v Information Commissioner was a 2013 first-tier tribunal case in the United Kingdom. It concerned a dispute over whether companies that had participated in government 'workfare' schemes should be released under the Freedom of Information Act following a request by a man called Frank Zola. The tribunal ruled that the names of participant companies should be released.

The Department for Work and Pensions (DWP) appealed to the Upper Tribunal but on 15 July 2014 this was dismissed.
