= Windfall tax (United Kingdom) =

Higher tax rate on firms/industries due to sudden increase in their profits

Windfall taxes have been applied on several occasions since 1997 by United Kingdom governments, in response to company profits that were considered to be excessive or unexpected.

== 1997 Taxes on privatised utilities ==
The Labour government of Tony Blair in 1997 introduced a windfall tax on what were described as "the excess profits of the privatised utilities". It followed from their manifesto commitment made during the 1997 general election campaign to impose a "windfall levy" on the privatised utilities. The tax came after 18 years of Conservative government, which had seen the privatisation of many state-owned assets, at prices which many considered too low. It aimed to "put right the bad deal which customers and taxpayers got from the privatisation of the utilities". The tax produced an estimated one-off income to the government of £5 billion, which was used to fund the New Deal, a welfare-to-work program that sought to tackle long-term unemployment, as well as providing capital investment for schools and the University for Industry (Learndirect).

The tax was calculated by means of a nine times P/E ratio, whereby the average post-tax profit in the four years after privatization was multiplied by nine to give the value for the purposes of the tax. The difference between this value and the total market capitalisation based on the company's flotation price was subject to a 23% "windfall tax". The tax was charged to the company and was payable in two instalments on 1 December 1997 and 1 December 1998.

The companies affected were those privatized by the Telecommunications Act 1984, the Airports Act 1986, the Gas Act 1986, the Water Act 1989, the Electricity Act 1989 (and the Electricity (Northern Ireland) Order 1992) and the Railways Act 1993. The firms affected were BAA, British Energy, British Gas (later BG plc and Centrica), British Telecom, National Power, Northern Ireland Electricity, Powergen, Scottish Hydro, Scottish Power, Railtrack, the regional electricity companies and the privatized water and sewerage companies (including such companies now forming part of Hyder, United Utilities and Scottish Power).

== Other proposals ==
From 1997 to 2022, no further windfall taxes were levied in the UK. However, calls were made for new ones. The Financial Times reported in January 2008 that the government was considering ways of maximising returns to the treasury from the sale of the troubled Northern Rock bank, which could include a windfall tax or the government taking an equity stake. In the event, the bank was not sold on to private investors, but instead came under UK government ownership. It was returned to the private sector in the 2010s.

== Windfall tax on energy companies ==
Calls were made for a windfall tax on energy companies during the summer of 2008 in the wake of energy price rises and the environmental record of the oil and gas industry. 120 Labour MPs supported the call, as well as columnist for The Guardian newspaper Polly Toynbee and the left-wing pressure group Compass. There were conflicting reports in the media over whether the government was looking into implementing the tax, with suggestions that government ministers were both interested in and opposed to the idea. Despite the BBC later reporting in early September that such a windfall tax was "still an option", then Prime Minister Gordon Brown confirmed at the Labour Party conference later that month that the idea had been scrapped.

The issue was raised again in 2013, led by former Prime Minister John Major, who described the recent energy price rises of more than 10% as "unacceptable", and called for a one-off emergency tax.

=== 2019 Labour proposal for windfall tax ===
A windfall tax on oil and gas companies featured in the Labour manifesto in the 2019 general election. Labour said the proposed tax would raise £11bn and aid in the transition to a green economy.

=== 2022 Labour proposal for windfall tax ===
Labour announced plans to have an annual windfall tax to give back to the least wealthy.

=== 2022 Conservative announcement of a windfall tax ===
In May 2022, Boris Johnson's government announced a windfall tax for energy companies, to help fund a package to relieve the UK cost of living crisis.

== See also ==
- Windfall tax
