= Holland & Barrett =

British multinational health food shop

Holland & Barrett International Limited
- Formerly: Holland & Barrett Europe Limited (2002–2004); NBTY Europe Limited (2004–2015)
- Type: Subsidiary
- Genre: Retail
- Founded: 1870; 156 years ago
- Headquarters: Nuneaton, England
- Number of locations: ~1,300
- Products: Vitamins; Minerals; Ethical beauty; Enzymes; Herbal medicines; Vegetarian food
- Revenue: £981 million (2025)
- Number of employees: 9,000
- Parent: LetterOne
- Website: hollandandbarrett.com

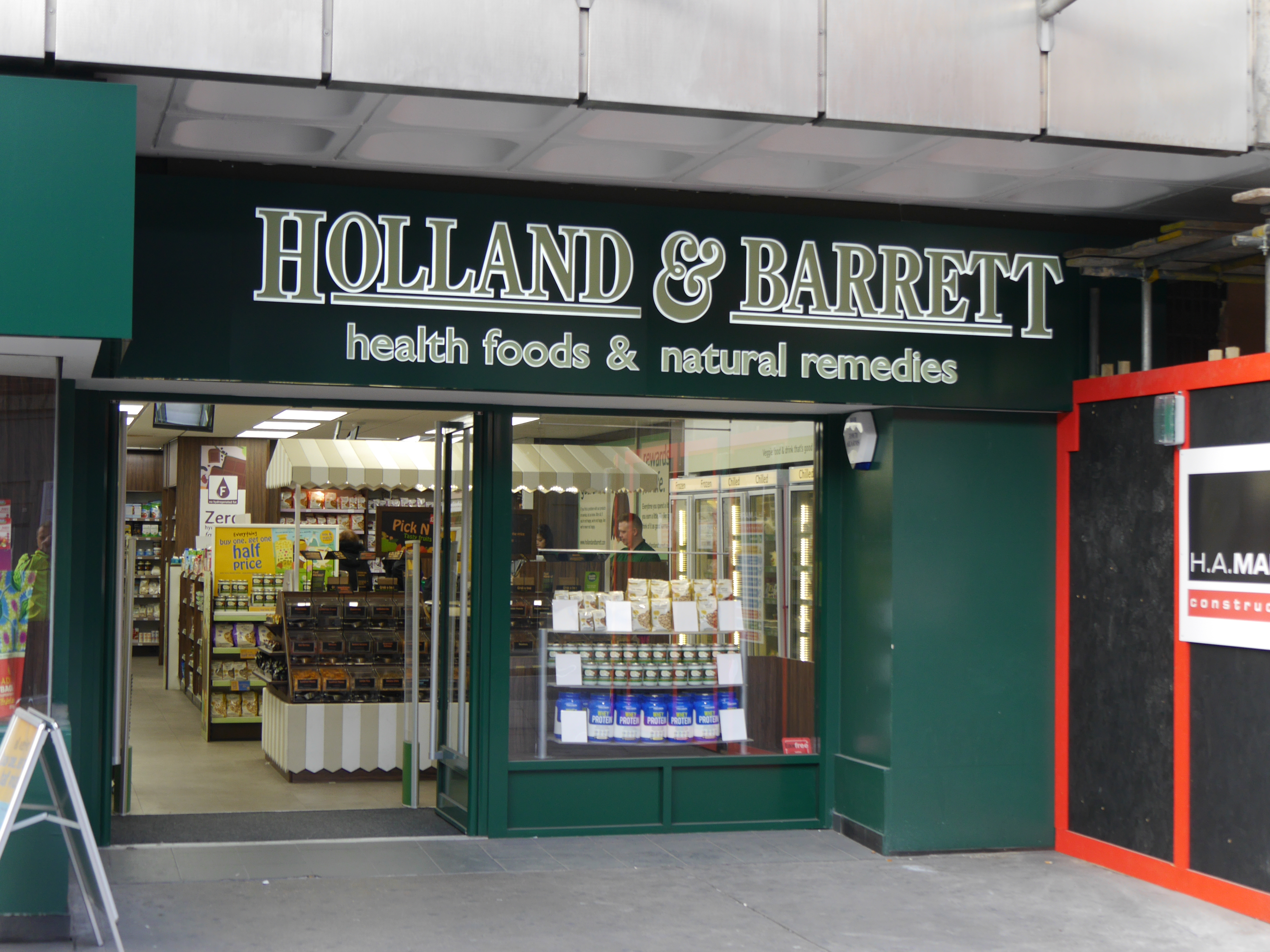
Holland & Barrett, King Street, Hammersmith, London

Holland & Barrett International Limited, trading as Holland & Barrett (H&B), is a British-based multinational health and wellness retailer with over 1,300 stores in 16 countries, including a substantial presence in the United Kingdom, Republic of Ireland, Netherlands, Belgium, Mainland China, Hong Kong, India, Saudi Arabia, Lithuania and UAE.

== History ==
Holland & Barrett was formed in 1870 by Major William Holland and Alfred Slapps Barrett, who bought a grocery store in Bishop's Stortford, selling groceries and clothing.

They developed their business into two shops – a grocery store and a clothing store. It is also evident that in 1900 they occupied a store in the High Street of Epsom. In the 1920s, Alfred Button & Sons bought the business and kept the name Holland & Barrett.

Holland & Barrett has since changed hands a number of times but only became associated with health stores in the 1970s. In 1970 Booker acquired Holland & Barrett, also acquiring Heath & Heather stores founded by James and Samuel Ryder in the 1920s which they later renamed Holland & Barrett. Lloyds Pharmacy purchased Holland & Barrett in 1992, after which NBTY acquired Holland & Barrett in 1997. NBTY was bought by American private equity firm The Carlyle Group in 2010.

The brand has become synonymous with the sale of vitamins, supplements, and homeopathic products; former MP David Tredinnick, an advocate of homeopathy, was dubbed "The Hon. Member for Holland and Barrett".

On 21 June 2017, it was announced that a series of negotiations had commenced by NBTY on behalf of The Carlyle Group to sell off Holland & Barrett in its entirety. A few companies showed interest in acquiring the company, namely AS Watson the owner of Superdrug and The Perfume Shop, and KKR the private equity firm both showed an interest in early negotiations. Five days later, on 26 June, it was reported that Holland & Barrett had been sold for £1.8 billion to L1 Retail, a group formerly controlled by Russian billionaire businessman Mikhail Fridman. Fridman stepped down from L1 Retail's parent company in early March 2022, after the European Union imposed sanctions on them in the wake of the Russian invasion of Ukraine.

== Advertising ==
Singer Kim Wilde featured in Holland & Barrett TV advertising between 2004–05. David Jason narrated the retailer's 2013 TV advertising campaign, featuring anthropomorphic woodland animals drawn by illustrator Yulia Drobova.

Some Holland & Barrett's advertisements and point of sale displays have been adjudicated as misleading, making unfair comparisons or claims that are unsupported by robust evidence.

== Franchising ==
In the 2000s the company started to expand internationally using franchising. The first three franchise stores opened in October 2008 in Durban, South Africa and the company subsequently had nine franchise stores operating in South Africa, all by the same franchisee.

In Singapore, the company set up sixteen franchise stores and one store was added in Malta in 2009. There are two Holland & Barrett stores in Gibraltar and three stores in Spain (Marbella, Fuengirola, Torrevieja).

In 2012, the company opened its first franchise in China with an outlet in Shanghai. In 2018, Holland & Barrett opened their first store in Jeddah, Saudi Arabia.

As of 2025, Holland & Barrett claim to have 1,600 stores open across 19 countries.

== Workfare programme criticism ==
Holland & Barrett was one of the first large companies to participate in the United Kingdom government's Work Programme, a workfare scheme that operated from 2011 to 2017. Under the scheme, some welfare recipients undertook unpaid work placements with participating employers. Holland & Barrett reportedly used approximately 1,000 unpaid jobseekers in its stores during the preceding year. The company stated that it provided eight-week work experience placements to people aged 18 to 24, and stated that more than 200 participants had subsequently obtained permanent positions with the company.

Holland & Barrett's participation received criticism from campaigners opposed to the use of unpaid work placements. Campaign groups including Boycott Workfare and the Solidarity Federation had organised protests against its participation. On 5 July 2012, Holland & Barrett announced that it would withdraw from the programme. The company stated the decision followed pressure from campaigners and concerns about disruption at its stores. The company also announced plans for a new full-time, salaried apprenticeship scheme. The company said that the 60 people then undertaking work experience would be the last to complete the eight-week placements.
