= Community work placements =

British workfare scheme

Community Work Placements were a UK Government workfare scheme under which unemployed claimants had to work for up to 26 weeks/30 hours in order to continue to receive Jobseekers Allowance The policy has been criticized by a number of organizations. Community Work Placements (CWPs) were launched at the start of 2014, but it was announced in November 2015, that the Department for Work and Pensions (DWP) was "not renewing" them.
