= Employment and Skills Group =

British welfare-to-work company

The Employment and Skills Group is a welfare-to-work company in the United Kingdom and one of several companies awarded contracts under the British government's Work Programme. The company was acquired by Interserve in December 2014 at a cost of £25 million.
