= Learndirect =

Company based in Bournemouth, England

Learndirect Limited
- Trade name: learndirect
- Type: Limited company
- Industry: Education
- Founded: 2000
- Headquarters: Wilson House, Lorne Park Road, Bournemouth BH1 1JN, United Kingdom
- Area served: United Kingdom
- Products: Training courses
- Owner: Queens Park Equity
- Website: www.learndirect.com

Learndirect Ltd, stylised as learndirect, is a British training provider founded in 2000, owned by the private equity firm Queens Park Equity. The company has a network of learning centres in England and Wales, and also runs some courses online.

By 2006 the organisation was assisting half a million learners per year, and in January 2013 the cumulative number was in excess of 3.5 million.

In March 2017, Ofsted inspectors gave the company the lowest possible rating as a result of poor management processes, leading the company to seek judicial review and an injunction stopping the publication of this poor result. The court lifted the reporting restriction on 14 August 2017. Subsequently, the Department for Education stated that it would withdraw all funding from Learndirect, placing the future of the organisation at risk.

== History ==
Learndirect was formerly owned by the Ufi Charitable Trust, a not-for-profit organisation which sold Learndirect and its parent Ufi Limited to LDC in 2011. Ufi was created in 1998 to take forward HM Government's stated vision of a 'University for Industry' in England, Wales and Northern Ireland, and launched Learndirect in 2000. Learndirect Scotland was the public-facing brand of the Scottish University for Industry, but has since become part of Skills Development Scotland as 'My World of Work'. Learndirect still operates in Scotland, and has offices in Glasgow.

Ufi Charitable Trust rebranded as Ufi VocTech Trust and awards grants for technology in adult education as well as investment funding. A condition of sale prevented Ufi VocTech Trust setting up a commercial competitor to Learndirect for the two years following the sale. Ufi VocTech Trust has no ongoing relationship with Learndirect but is custodian of the original intent to improve access to skills through the use of technology.

The House of Commons Committee of Public Accounts undertook a review of the programme in 2005–2006; it found that the programme had received a total of £930 million in public funding, and was critical of the poor involvement of businesses, the high cost of marketing, and the low number of learners recorded as meeting their training objectives.

Ufi announced in late 2009 that it would be unable to sustain the large network of centres due to proposed budget cuts. The Skills Funding Agency, established in early 2010, contracted Ufi to deliver against agreed targets in respect of qualifications achieved by learners, as well as a raft of quality, equality, and other indirect targets. However, following the May 2010 general election in which the Labour government was replaced by a Conservative-Liberal Democrat coalition, the future of Learndirect became unclear. Funding for English as a foreign or second language through Learndirect centres ceased in July 2010, and around that time some learning centres were closed.

According to The Independent, Ufi was included in a list compiled by the new government of quangos which it sought to abolish. The company and the Learndirect brand were bought by LDC, part of Lloyds Banking Group, in October 2011. Learndirect thus became an independent training provider competing in the open market and Ufi Ltd became a charitable trust. Learndirect Scotland became part of Skills Development Scotland and was renamed "My World of Work".

Learndirect participated as a provider in the UK government's mandatory unpaid work experience programme for those on Jobseeker's Allowance, in place between 2011 and 2017. The scheme was commonly known as "workfare", and formally by Learndirect and the Department for Work and Pensions as Mandatory Work Activity.

Between 2012 and 2015, Learndirect’s profits declined 85%, while student failure rates doubled in its educational programmes, and achievement rates for its apprenticeships dropped below Ofsted's 62% minimum to qualify for grants. During this period, 84% of Learndirect's profits were redirected to its parent firm to pay for dividends, debt-servicing, and legal fees, as well as half a million pounds to sponsor the Marussia F1 racing team.

=== 2017 Ofsted inspection and aftermath ===
In March 2017, the Education & Skills Funding Agency (ESFA) issued a "notice of serious breach" against Learndirect for 70% of its apprenticeship services not meeting state-required minimums. This was followed in the same month by an inspection by Ofsted, with publication of the report delayed until after the 2017 snap election.

Learndirect sought judicial review of the report, on grounds that the sample size was insufficient and the lead inspector had predetermined the outcome; Learndirect requested and obtained a publishing injunction during the proceedings. In filings for this injunction, the managing director of Learndirect claimed that the Skills Funding Agency said it would serve three months notice on all its contracts if its Ofsted rating were to stand.

In August 2017, the High Court lifted the injunction and the report was published. Ofsted's overall effectiveness rating was 'inadequate', with five areas rated 'requires improvement' and two – 'outcomes for learners' and 'apprenticeships' – rated 'inadequate'. Ofsted noted positive changes in the last year, leading to early signs of improvement.

The ESFA decided to continue funding Learndirect for the 2017/18 academic year, then withdraw funding from July 2018. Funding of Learndirect Apprenticeships Ltd, paid by large employers through the Apprenticeship Levy (which began in April 2017) is not affected. The National Audit Office published an investigation into the monitoring, inspection and funding of Learndirect in December 2017.

According to BBC reports in September 2017, the chair of the Public Accounts Committee said Learndirect should face an investigation after its Ofsted rating. The committee's enquiry Funding of Learndirect Ltd began in January 2018.

=== Later events ===
In January 2025, the Watchdog segment of the BBC One television programme The One Show reported on two Learndirect customers who had not received refunds to which they were entitled.

=== Changes of ownership ===
In June 2018, as Learndirect drew close to insolvency, Lloyds Development Capital sold the company for a nominal sum to Dimensions Training Solutions (DTS), part of the privately held Stonebridge Group. DTS is a work-based training provider established in Yorkshire in 1983, which was acquired by Stonebridge in 2015.

In February 2020, a reorganisation saw the name of Stonebridge Colleges (Publishing) Limited changed to Learndirect Limited. In August 2020, Learndirect Digital Holdings Limited was created in order to acquire Learndirect Limited, Stonebridge Associated Colleges Limited and related businesses. The ultimate owner is Queens Park Equity Partners, a Guernsey-based private equity investor.

== Services provided ==
Learndirect offers courses, training and employment services. In August 2017, the number of enrolled trainees was reported as 73,000.

In 2004, an average of 65% of students completed their courses but this figure had improved to 92% by 2009.

Learndirect administers the "Life in the United Kingdom" test, for candidates for British citizenship, on behalf of UK Visas and Immigration, a division of the Home Office.

== Acquisitions ==
In March 2021, Learndirect acquired two training companies, one that specializes in animal welfare training and another, i-to-i, which specializes in teaching English as a foreign language.
