= Centre for Economic and Social Inclusion =

UK research organization

- Headquarters: 89 Albert Embankment, SE1 7TP
- Location: London, England
- Chief Executive: Dave Simmonds
- Website: www.learningandwork.org.uk/

The Centre for Economic and Social Inclusion, known as Inclusion, was a research organisation that existed to promote social inclusion in the labour market. It was a not-for-profit, politically independent organisation based in London with two regional bases: Inclusion North West in Liverpool and Inclusion US in New York City. All its surpluses were invested back into developing its products and its employees (over 30 of them). Inclusion's research and labour market expertise was often cited in the media, from the Guardian to the BBC to the Financial Times.

On 1 January 2016 the organisation merged with the National Institute of Adult Continuing Education to form a new organisation, the Learning and Work Institute.

== Research and policy ==
Inclusion made recommendations on how to equip housing providers with the tools to tackle unemployment among their residents; it advised how partners supporting ESOL learners could improve delivery; and it was involved in the evaluation of the government’s flagship Work Programme as well as the evaluation of Work Choice, among many other research projects.

== Events ==
Inclusion’s events department ran essential conferences, seminars and webinars for the welfare to work industry, providing opportunities for sector professionals to network and share best practice.

== Toolkits and resources ==
Inclusion created a range of tools to support employment-related services professionals in their work to help unemployed people into jobs, such as the Online Welfare to Work Intelligence handbook – a full reference guide to benefit entitlements, financial support and welfare to work programmes; an e-briefing offering a free weekly news roundup and a monthly update to make sense of the latest labour market statistics; and statistics tools from the Child Poverty Toolkit to the Local Labour Force Mapping Toolkit to the Work Programme Statistical Support Package and many more.

Inclusion also published Working Brief, a quarterly publication firmly focused on policy-makers, decision-makers, and influencers at the national and local levels. It aims to promote a high standard of debate in welfare reform and social inclusion in the labour market, and is read by key people in welfare policy. With a circulation of 2,000, Working Brief is read by MPs, Chief Executives of Local Authorities, officials in the Department for Work and Pensions and media organisations.

Indus Delta is a website that offers daily news, a weekly newsletter, a discussion forum, a job board and resources for employment related services professionals and has been owned by Inclusion since 2010.

== Affiliated organisations ==
Organisations affiliated with Inclusion were: the European Offender Employment Forum (EOEF) and the Centre for Responsible Credit (CfRC).

== Merger ==
With effect from 1 January 2016, the Centre for Economic and Social Inclusion merged with the National Institute of Adult Continuing Education to form a new organisation, the Learning and Work Institute.
