= Ingeus =

International public services company

Ingeus Limited
- Company type: Private
- Industry: human services provider
- Founded: 1989
- Founder: Thérèse Rein
- Area served: worldwide
- Owner: Providence Service Corporation
- Number of employees: 1700
- Website: www.ingeus.com

Ingeus Limited is a British-based, Australian provider of employment and health programmes, services for young people, training and skills support, Labour hire and probation services.

It is notable in part, for being founded by Thérèse Rein, the wife of the 26th Prime Minister of Australia, Kevin Rudd.

== History ==
Ingeus originated as a rehabilitation company based in Australia in 1989, named Work Directions. It then grew to become an international provider of employment services. In 2002 the company was rebranded as Ingeus.

The company has 150 offices and more than 1,700 employees. It operates in the UK, France, Sweden, Korea, Germany, Switzerland, Poland, Australia, Saudi Arabia and New Zealand.

In 2011 Ingeus and Deloitte created a joint venture to operate contracts in the government welfare-to-work Work Programme. In 2013 Deloitte withdrew from the joint venture as Work Programme fees were reduced.

in 2014 Ingeus was sold to Arizona-based human services provider Providence Service Corporation. Thérèse Rein and Kevin Rudd received approximately $160M from the sale.
