= Business Employment Services Training =

Welfare-to-work company in the United Kingdom

- Company type: Conglomerate
- Founded: 1982
- Headquarters: UK

Business Employment Services Training (BEST) was a welfare-to-work company in the United Kingdom. BEST was one of several companies that had a contract with the British government as part of the Work Programme - a workfare programme whereby unemployed individuals must work for their unemployment benefits.

They also performed tasks previously undertaken by Jobcentre/Jobcentre Plus offices. For example, they had unemployed individuals attend regular appointments with an 'Advisor', who checked what they had been doing to find work.

For many years BEST had contracts under the New Deal scheme, which was the Labour Government's scheme replaced by the Conservative's Work Programme.

== Takeover ==
In 2012 BEST was bought by Interserve and is now called Interserve Working Futures.
