= R (Reilly) v Secretary of State for Work and Pensions =

UK legal case

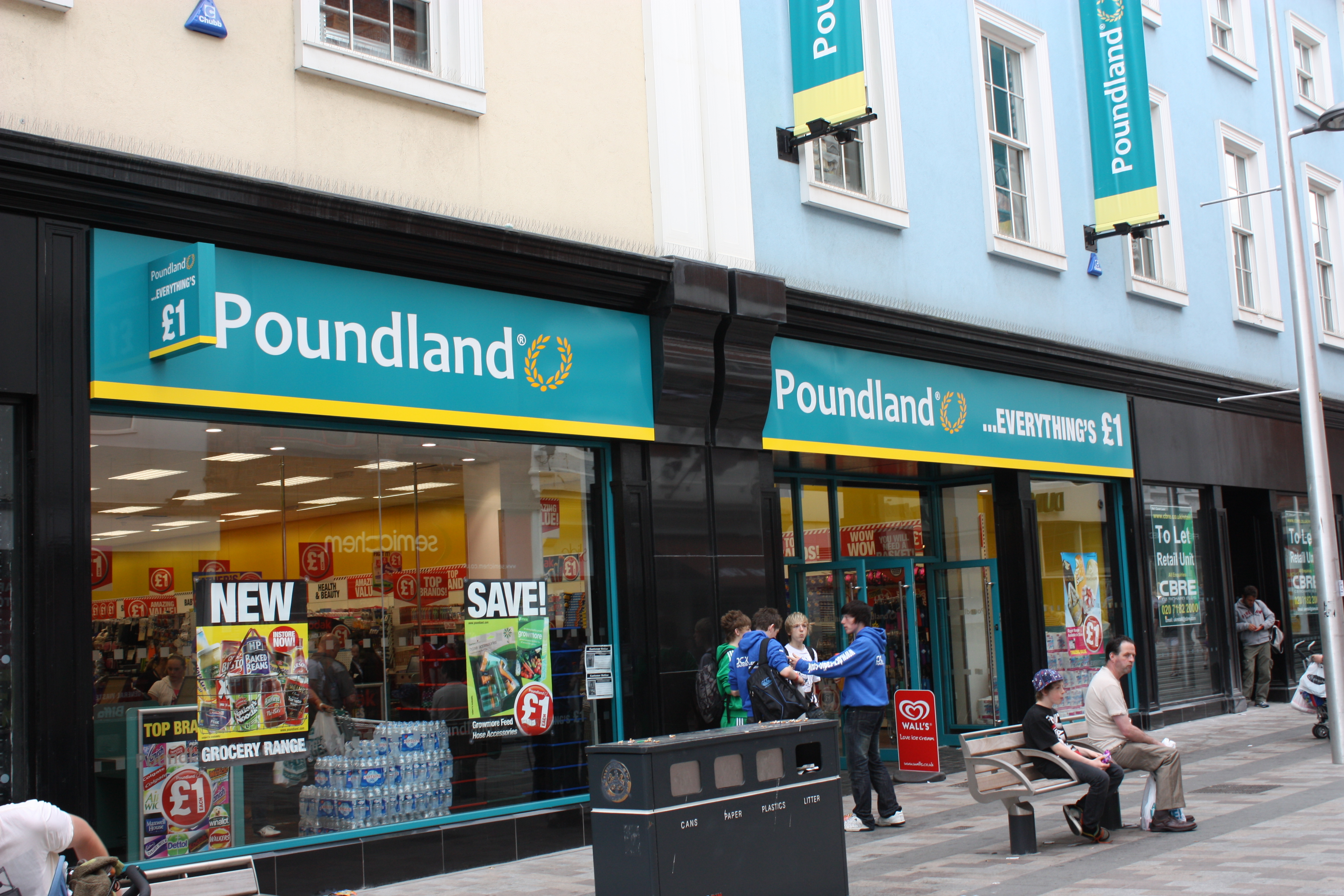
- Court: Supreme Court of the United Kingdom
- Full case name: R (on the application of Reilly and another) v Secretary of State for Work and Pensions
- Decided: 30 October 2013
- Citations: [2013] UKSC 6; [2013] WLR(D) 413; [2013] 3 WLR 1276; [2014] AC 453]
- Transcript: BAILII

Case history
- Appealed from: [2013] EWCA Civ 66 (Court of Appeal); [2012] EWHC 2292 (Admin) (High Court)

Court membership
- Judges sitting: Lord Neuberger; Lord Mance; Lord Clarke; Lord Sumption; Lord Toulson

Case opinions
- Decision by: Lord Neuberger, Lord Toulson
- Concurrence: Lord Mance, Lord Sumption, Lord Clarke

Keywords
- ultra vires; administrative law; forced labour

R (Reilly and Wilson) v Secretary of State for Work and Pensions [2013] UKSC 68 is a United Kingdom constitutional law and labour law case that found the conduct of the Department for Work and Pensions "workfare" policy was unlawful. Caitlin Reilly, an unemployed geology graduate, and Jamieson Wilson, an unemployed driver, challenged the Jobcentre policy of making the unemployed work for private companies to get unemployment income. The outcome of the case affects over 3,000 claimants and entails around £130m unpaid benefits.

== Facts ==
Ms Reilly claimed that the Secretary of State had acted ultra vires by forcing her to attend two weeks of 'training' and work for another two weeks at Poundland without pay, just in order to receive Jobseeker's Allowance. Under the new Jobseekers Act 1995 s. 17A, the Secretary of State could write regulations for claimants to get JSA in prescribed circumstances, and to be require to take part in schemes of a "prescribed description", which under section 35 meant "determined in accordance with regulations". The Secretary of State issued the Jobseeker's Allowance (Employment, Skills and Enterprise Scheme) Regulations 2011 where regulation 2 said schemes were to assist claimants to get employment, but did not contain any description of the scheme. Under regulation 4(2)(c)(e) claimants were supposed to be given written notice of what they were "required to do" and information about the consequences of failing to do so. After, the SS announced sub-schemes and issued guidance to Jobcentre advisers to give claimants "full details" of available schemes. Reilly received no written notification requiring her to join a scheme, but was simply told by a Jobcentre adviser that training and Poundland was mandatory.

In a joined case, Mr Wilson was given written notice requiring his participation in a scheme for the long-term unemployed and that his income "may be stopped for up to 26 weeks" if he did not take part. The Jobcentre refused to give any more information. He refused to take part and his income was stopped for 6 months.

Reilly and Wilson claimed the Regulations should be quashed because (1) they were ultra vires JSA 1995 s. 17A because they failed to prescribe a description of the scheme; (2) there was a failure to comply with the notice provisions in reg. 4; and (3) enforcing the Regulations was unlawful without a published policy on the nature of the scheme and unpaid work. Reilly added that (4) needing to take unpaid work was forced labour contrary to the European Convention on Human Rights article 4.

== Judgment ==
=== High Court ===
On 6 August 2012, the High Court ruled (contrary to the arguments of Reilly and Wilson) that the scheme could not be considered slavery, and was not therefore a breach of Article 4 of the European Convention on Human Rights. On the other hand, it also ruled that the Department for Work and Pensions had breached its Regulation 4 (which required certain details of the Work Programme to be given to participants in writing).

Both parties expressed their wish to appeal the judgement.

=== Court of Appeal ===
On 12 February 2013, the decision of the High Court was overturned on appeal, with the Court of Appeal ruling that the work placement system was unlawful because Parliament had not given the DWP lawful authority to impose such schemes and because the people involved were not provided with sufficient information about it. The Court of Appeal quashed the Jobseeker's Allowance (Employment, Skills and Enterprise Scheme) Regulations 2011. The court did not state whether or not the current case impinges on Article 4 of the European Convention on Human Rights.

The government appealed the judgment, but on 30 October 2013, the decision of the Appeal Court was upheld by the Supreme Court.

=== Supreme Court ===
The Supreme Court held there had been no contravention of Article 4 of the European Convention on Human Rights, but since the court ruled against workfare the comments regarding the human rights do not form part of the reasons for the judgment and therefore are not legally binding.

Lord Neuberger and Lord Toulson wrote the following:

15. In March 2012, jobseeker's allowance was being received by just over 1.6 million people aged over 18, of whom around 357,000 had been in receipt of the allowance for more than a year. About 480,000 were aged under 24, of whom 55,000 had been in receipt of the allowance for more than a year. Forecast expenditure on the allowance in the year 2011/12 was just under £5bn.
16. In a nutshell, the amendments to the 1995 Act effected in 2009, including section 17A, envisaged that regulations would (i) require participants to undertake unpaid work, or work-related activity, during a prescribed period, to improve their prospects of employment and (ii) impose sanctions (in particular, loss of the allowance) on those who without good cause failed to participate in such schemes. Those regulations materialised as the 2011 Regulations ...
17. A variety of "work for your benefit" programmes have been made under the 2011 Regulations. The present appeals concern two such schemes.
18. The sector-based work academy scheme ("sbwa scheme") was launched in August 2011, and is administered by advisers at social security offices, or Jobcentres, which, until 2011, were run by an executive government agency under the name of Jobcentre Plus. The stated target of the sbwa scheme is those who do not have any serious barriers to finding work, but who would benefit from a short period of work-focused training and work-experience placement linked to a genuine job vacancy.
19. The Community Action Programme ("CAP") was launched in November 2011, and its stated aim is to help very long-term unemployed claimants back into work. It provides up to six months' work experience, and is administered by private companies, one of which is called Ingeus Ltd ("Ingeus"), most of whose recruits are referred or identified by Jobcentres.

The facts relating to Miss Reilly and Mr Wilson

20. Miss Reilly was born in 1989 and first claimed jobseeker's allowance in August 2010. Three months later, she got a paid work experience placement at a museum pursuant to a Government scheme, and was paid the minimum wage subsidised by that scheme. When that placement ended, she continued to work voluntarily at the museum, with a view to pursuing a career in museums. She has always complied with the jobseeking conditions, and has been committed to seeking employment. Miss Reilly is no longer claiming jobseeker's allowance as she has obtained paid employment at a supermarket.
21. From 31 October 2011, Miss Reilly participated, albeit unwillingly, in the sbwa scheme. This involved a week's training, a two-week unpaid work placement at a Poundland store, and a further week's training. She participated in the scheme because her Jobcentre adviser informed her that her participation in the scheme was mandatory. That was wrong: it is not mandatory to take part in the sbwa scheme, although once a claimant accepts a place, she must complete the scheme. She asserts that had she been correctly informed about the scheme, she would have exercised her right not to participate in it. Contrary to regulation 4 of the 2011 Regulations ("regulation 4"), Miss Reilly did not receive any written notice concerning her participation in the sbwa scheme.
22. Mr Wilson was born in 1971, and worked as a qualified Heavy Goods Vehicle driver from 1994 to 2008, since when he has been unemployed. Mr Wilson started receiving jobseeker's allowance in 2009. In August 2011 his Jobcentre adviser told him that in order for him to continue to receive his jobseeker's allowance he had to take part in a new programme that was under trial in his area. He was given a letter stating that if he did not find a job within three months he would be referred to the CAP which would "involve up to six months of near full-time work experience with additional weekly job search support requirements". The letter informed him that a refusal to participate could result in the loss of his benefit, and that, if he had any questions, he should ask his personal adviser.
23. At a meeting in September 2011, Mr Wilson's adviser gave him another letter stating that if he had not found a job in two months, the CAP would commence. Again, it informed him that he might "lose his benefit" if he did not participate in the CAP. ... [...]
24. As a result of his refusal to participate in the CAP scheme, a two-week benefits sanction was imposed on Mr Wilson in early May 2012. Later the same month, it was decided to impose two further benefits sanctions as a result of Mr Wilson's successive failures to attend a job search session with Ingeus on two occasions during April 2012. In total, these second and third benefits sanctions resulted in a cessation of benefit payments for 6 months. [...]
25. Whether one takes the Employment, Skills and Enterprise Scheme (which is really a group of schemes including the sbwa scheme and the CAP) as a single scheme, or whether, as seems more natural, one takes the sbwa scheme and the CAP as separate schemes, they were undoubtedly schemes which fell within the ambit of regulation 2.
26. ... it appears clear to us that regulation 2 does not satisfy the requirements of section 17A(1). The courts have no more important function than to ensure that the executive complies with the requirements of Parliament as expressed in a statute. Further, particularly where the statute concerned envisages regulations which will have a significant impact on the lives and livelihoods of many people, the importance of legal certainty and the impermissibility of sub-delegation are of crucial importance. The observations of Scott LJ in Blackpool Corporation v Locker [1948] 1 KB 349, 362 are in point: "John Citizen" should not be "in complete ignorance of what rights over him and his property have been secretly conferred by the minister", as otherwise "[f]or practical purposes, the rule of law ... breaks down because the aggrieved subject's legal remedy is gravely impaired". [...]
27. Given the conclusion that the 2011 Regulations are ultra vires because they fail to provide a "prescribed description" of any scheme, it is strictly unnecessary to consider the further grounds raised by Miss Reilly and Mr Wilson for contending that the 2011 Regulations were invalid, but we will do so briefly. [...]
28. As described in para 21 above, no written notice was given to Miss Reilly, contrary to regulation 4(1) and 4(2) set out in para 12 above.
29. In relation to Mr Wilson, there is a dispute which falls to be determined, namely whether the letter of 16 November 2011, quoted in para 24 above, complied with regulation 4(2)(c) and regulation 4(2)(e). In agreement with Foskett J, the Court of Appeal held that it did not satisfy the latter provision, but they also found that it did not satisfy regulation 4(2)(c).
30. In our opinion, there was a failure to comply with regulation 4(2)(c). The letter of 16 November 2011 merely informed Mr Wilson that he had to perform "any activities" requested of him by Ingeus, without giving him any idea of the likely nature of the tasks, the hours of work, or the place or places of work. It seems to us, therefore, that the letter failed to give Mr Wilson "details of what [he was] required to do by way of participation". [...]
31. Properly informed claimants, with knowledge not merely of the schemes available, but also of the criteria for being placed on such schemes, should be able to explain what would, in their view, be the most reasonable and appropriate scheme for them, in a way which would be unlikely to be possible without such information. Some claimants may have access to information downloadable from a government website, if they knew what to look for, but many will not. For many of those dependent on benefits, voluntary agencies such as Citizens Advice Bureaux play an important role in informing and assisting them in relation to benefits to which they may be entitled, how they should apply, and what matters they should draw to the attention of their Jobcentre adviser. [...]
32. Insofar as such information is of a general kind, there can be no doubt that it is in everyone's interest that the Jobcentre adviser provides it to a claimant either in written form or via the website, with an explanation (preferably in writing) as to where and how it can be accessed. If that is not done, it may be harder evidentially for the Secretary of State to show that a claimant has been given all the information fairly required in order to be enable him or her to make an informed decision. [...]
33. Ms Lieven's argument involves two steps. First, Ms Reilly's work at Poundland was "exacted ... under menace of [a] penalty", ie disallowance of jobseeker's allowance, and was therefore prima facie forced labour, and for that she relies on the decision of the Strasbourg court in Van Der Mussele v Belgium (1983) 6 EHRR 163, para 34. Secondly, the Secretary of State could not rely on article 4.3(d) because the illegality of the regulations and the notice prevented the Secretary of State being able to argue that the work was part of Ms Reilly's "normal civic obligations".
34. In our judgment the argument fails at the first step. As the court noted in Van Der Mussele at para 32, article 4 was largely based on Convention 29 of the International Labour Organisation, the main aim of which was to stop exploitation of labour in the colonies. Forced labour is not fully defined and may take various forms, but exploitation is at its heart. Article 4.3 contains particular instances of obligatory labour which are common features of life in democratic societies and do not represent the mischief at which the article is aimed. [...]
35. In the present case we are concerned with a condition imposed for the payment of a claim for a state benefit. Jobseeker's allowance, as its name suggests, is a benefit designed for a person seeking work, and the purpose of the condition is directly linked to the purpose of the benefit. The provision of a conditional benefit of that kind comes nowhere close to the type of exploitative conduct at which article 4 is aimed. Nor is it to the point that according to Ms Reilly the work which she did for Poundland was unlikely in fact to advance her employment prospects. Whether the imposition of a work requirement as a condition of a benefit amounts to exacting forced labour within the meaning of article 4 cannot depend on the degree of likelihood of the condition achieving its purpose. [...]
36. In X v The Netherlands (1976) 7 DR 161, the applicant was a specialised worker in the building industry. He claimed unemployment benefit and was required as a condition of payment to accept work which he considered to be unsuitable for a person with his qualifications and socially demeaning. He refused the offer and brought a complaint of a violation of article 4. The Commission declared the complaint inadmissible, observing that it was open to the claimant to refuse the work and that its acceptance was only a condition for the grant of unemployment benefit. There could therefore be no question of forced or compulsory labour within the meaning of article 4.
37. In Talmon v The Netherlands [1997] ECHR 207 the applicant was a scientist. He claimed unemployment benefit and was required as a condition to accept work which he considered unsuitable. Because of his refusal to do it, his benefit payments were reduced. He complained that by having his benefits reduced he was being forced to do work to which he had a conscientious objection, contrary to article 4. The application was declared manifestly ill-founded and inadmissible.
38. In Schuitemaker v The Netherlands (Application No 15906/08) (unreported) 4 May 2010 the applicant was a philosopher by profession. She claimed unemployment benefit and was told that her benefits would be reduced unless she was willing to take up a wider range of employment than she considered suitable. She complained under article 4 that she was being forced to take up labour irrespective of whether it would be suitable for her. The court held that her application was inadmissible. It noted that the obligation of which she complained was in effect a condition for the granting of benefits, and it stated as a general principle that a state which has introduced a system of social security is fully entitled to lay down conditions which have to be met for a person to be eligible for benefits under that system.
39. Van Der Mussele, on which Ms Lieven relies, was a different type of case. The applicant was a trainee advocate. He was required to represent at his own expense some criminal defendants who were entitled to legal aid. The sanction if he refused to do so was that he would not be registered as an advocate. He complained of a violation of article 4. The obvious difference between that case and the present is that it was not a simple case of a conditional benefit, where the purpose of the benefit was intended to be enhanced by the condition. Rather, it was a case of the state fulfilling its legal obligations to third parties at the expense of the applicant. The court accepted, at para 32, that the menace of the penalty and the lack of voluntariness on the part of the applicant met the starting point for considering whether he had been subjected to forced labour in violation of article 4.
40. However, that was only the beginning of the inquiry. To amount to a violation of article 4, the work had to be not only compulsory and involuntary, but the obligation to work, or its performance, must be "unjust", "oppressive", "an avoidable hardship", "needlessly distressing" or "somewhat harassing". As we read the judgment, the court was not there setting out five different categories but was using a variety of expressions to elucidate a single underlying concept, which we have referred to as exploitation. In Van Der Mussele, at para 40, the court concluded for a combination of reasons that there had been no forced labour within the meaning of article 4.2, having regard to the social standards generally obtaining in Belgium and in other democratic societies. The court therefore considered it unnecessary to decide whether the work in question was in any event justified under article 4.3 (d).
41. We do not consider that the imposition of the work condition in this case, intended as it was to support the purpose for which the conditional benefit was provided, met the starting point for a possible contravention of article 4. If it did, we do not consider that it fell within article 4.2, having regard to the Strasbourg guidance and the underlying objective of the article.
42. Does it make a difference to this analysis that what Ms Reilly was told about her obligation to take part in the sbwa scheme, as a condition of receiving jobseeker's allowance, was unauthorised and wrong as a matter of domestic law? The answer is no. The fact that the requirement was invalid does not of itself mean that it also fulfilled the characteristics of forced labour within the meaning of article 4.2. The logic of the contrary argument would produce strange results. If, for example, a public sector employee were wrongly directed to do something which was in fact beyond the terms of his contract of employment, and the employee did as he was told from fear of disciplinary action, we do not accept that the invalidity of the order would of itself trigger a violation of article 4. Equally, if the 2011 Regulations had unjustifiably discriminated between jobseekers on the ground of gender, and hence had been unlawful, it cannot be right that anyone required to work pursuant to such regulations would therefore have had their article 4 rights infringed. Whether the requirement was invalid under domestic law and whether it involved a violation of article 4 are different issues, and proof of the former does not of itself determine the latter.

Lord Clarke, Lord Mance and Lord Sumption agreed.

== Significance ==
=== Reactions ===
The findings of the court have been judged to indicate a shift in the nature of "the relationship between social rights and obligations in the context of unemployment policy" in the UK: the founder of the modern UK welfare state, William Beveridge, conceived the classical welfare state as freeing people from Want, while obliging them to work when possible. Kenneth Veitch has argued the rulings in Reilly v Secretary of State imply that Want is now used as a threat to ensure that welfare claimants habituate themselves to the demands of the contemporary workplace.

=== Subsequent litigation ===
On 19 March 2013, before the appeal to the Supreme Court was completed, the Government also passed the Jobseekers (Back to Work Schemes) Act 2013 to retrospectively make its unlawful sanctions against benefits claimants legal, in order to avoid potentially having to repay unlawfully withheld benefits payments of around £130m.

In response to the law change, the law firm acting for Reilly and Wilson, Public Interest Lawyers, lodged submissions to the Supreme Court, arguing that "the actions of the secretary of state ... represent a clear violation of Article 6 of the European Convention on Human Rights and the rule of law, as an interference in the judicial process by the legislature".

On Friday 4 July 2014, Mrs Justice Lang, sitting at the High Court in London, ruled that the retrospective nature of the legislation interfered with the "right to a fair trial" under Article Six of the Convention on Human Rights. The government appealed this ruling, but on 29 April 2016, the Court of Appeal upheld the previous court's decision; Lord Justice Underhill, summarising the court's findings, emphasised that although the Act was incompatible with the European Convention on Human Rights, "it is up to the Government, subject to any further appeal, to decide what action to take in response", as a declaration of incompatibility does not mean the law is overturned or ceases to be effective.

== See also ==
- Work Programme (United Kingdom)
- Workfare
- Unemployment in the United Kingdom
- Youth unemployment in the United Kingdom
- Jobseekers (Back to Work Schemes) Act 2013
