= Work and Health Programme =

UK welfare-to-work scheme

The Work and Health Programme was a British government programme that aimed to support disabled people, vulnerable people, and long term unemployed people find suitable work. The scheme was operated by the Department for Work and Pensions (DWP) and was first introduced in England and Wales in November 2017 and operated until 2024.

== History ==
The Work and Health Programme was launched in November 2017, as a successor to Work Choice. The Work and Health Programme was rolled out progressively, with all areas being set up by March 2018. The programme was delivered by 5 different providers across England and Wales. Funding for The Work and Health Programme was drastically reduced compared to the prior Work Choice and Work Programme schemes that it replaced. At £130 million a year, its funding represented only 20% of the previous two schemes' budgets combined. Eligibility for the programme included disabled individuals, those unemployed for over two years, and individuals considered a priority, such as care leavers, refugees, or homeless people.

The programme had supported 300,000 people by November 2023, with 31% of individuals still in their jobs after two years.

The programme stopped accepting new referrals at the end of September 2024. Support was continued until July 2026 for participants already partaking in the programme. The ending of the programme caused concerns that there would be gaps in provision for disabled people trying to get into work. Maximus Inc. claimed that the gap in provision meant that the UK was without a form of national support for disabled people seeking work for the first time since 2000.

Following the closure of the Work and Health Programme, research found that those who took part in it voluntarily were more likely to have found more paid work, compared to those who were forced to take part. However, 8 out of 10 disabled individuals on the programme were unable to secure work through the scheme.
