= NIACE =

Defunct UK educational charity

Logo of NIACE

The NIACE (National Institute of Adult Continuing Education) was an educational charity in England and Wales, with headquarters in Leicester and Cardiff plus a subsidiary office in London. The organization, founded in 1921 as the British Institute of Adult Education, was dedicated to advocating for and promoting adult learning. It was the main advocacy body for adult learning in England and Wales and probably the largest body devoted to adult education in the world.

On 1 January 2016 NIACE merged with the Centre for Economic and Social Inclusion to form a new organisation, the Learning and Work Institute.

== Aim ==
The main aim of NIACE was to promote the study and advancement of adult continuing education by improving the quality of available opportunities, increasing the number of adults engaged in formal and informal learning, and widening access for communities under-represented in existing provision. This mission was summed up by the phrase “more, better and different.”

== Methods ==
NIACE undertook this work through:

- advocacy to national and local government, funding bodies, industry and providers of education and training;
- collaboration with providers in all sectors of post-compulsory education and training; and through fostering progression routes for adults seeking to develop pathways as learners;
- a commitment to supporting evaluation and monitoring and to high-quality service;
- securing informed debate – through research, enquiry, publication and through arranging seminars and conferences;
- effective networking – to ensure that lessons learned in one part of the system could be drawn on elsewhere;
- ensuring that the best of international practice was available to its members and users;
- a commitment to being itself a well-managed learning organization.

From 1988, Alan Tuckett OBE was the Director of NIACE.

The predecessor of Alan Tuckett was Arthur Stock. Its President from 2006 was David Sherlock CBE (former Chief Inspector of the Adult Learning Inspectorate), and before that Christine King (Vice Chancellor of Staffordshire University), and before that Richard Smethurst (Provost, Keble College, Oxford).

== Merger to form Learning and Work Institute ==
With effect from 1 January 2016 NIACE merged with the Centre for Economic and Social Inclusion to form a new organisation, the Learning and Work Institute.
