= Work Programme =

UK welfare-to-work scheme

The Work Programme (WP) was a UK government welfare-to-work programme introduced in Great Britain in June 2011. It was the flagship welfare-to-work scheme of the 2010–2015 UK coalition government. Under the Work Programme the task of getting the long-term unemployed into work was outsourced to a range of public sector, private sector and third sector organisations. The scheme replaced a range of schemes which existed under previous New Labour governments including Employment Zones, New Deal, Flexible New Deal and the now abolished Future Jobs Fund scheme which aimed to tackle youth unemployment. Despite being the flagship welfare-to-work scheme of the Conservative-led coalition government, and then the incumbent Conservative government from May 2015, the DWP announced, in November 2015, that it was replacing the Work Programme and Work Choice with a new Work and Health Programme for the longer-term unemployed and those with health conditions. The DWP also announced that it would not be renewing Mandatory Work Activity and Help to Work which included Community Work Placements.

DWP staff were notified that, as of February 2017, new referrals to the Work Programme are discontinued. It was officially stopped on 1 April 2017. It was replaced by the Work and Health Programme which began its rollout in November 2017.

== Participation ==
Individuals could be mandated to take part in the Work Programme if they were in receipt of Jobseeker's Allowance or Employment Support Allowance:

- after three months if not in education, employment or training
- after nine months - if aged 18 to 24
- after 12 months - if 25 or over

== Subcontractors ==
Below is a list of providers under the Work Programme for each area of Britain. Note that these "primes" could sub-contract some cases to other providers.

- Scotland: Working Links and Ingeus
- Merseyside, Halton, Cumbria and Lancashire: A4e and Ingeus
- North, West and Greater Manchester, Cheshire and Warrington: Avanta, G4S and Seetec
- Coventry, Warwickshire, Staffordshire and The Marches: Employment and Skills Group and Serco
- Birmingham, Solihull and the Black Country: EOS, Pertemps People Development Groups and Newcastle College
- Wales: Working Links and Rehab JobFit
- Gloucestershire, Wiltshire and West of England: Rehab JobFit, Prospect Training Services and Learndirect
- Devon, Cornwall, Somerset and Dorset: Prospect Services and Working Links
- North East: Avanta and Ingeus
- North East Yorkshire and Humber: Intraining, Cityworks, G4S and Newcastle College
- West Yorkshire: BEST (Now Interserve Working Futures Ltd, part of Interserve) and Ingeus
- South Yorkshire: A4e and Serco
- East Midlands: A4e and Ingeus
- East of England: Ingeus and Seetec
- West London: Ingeus, Reed and Maximus
- East London: A4e Careers Development Group and Seetec
- Surrey, Sussex and Kent: Avanta and G4S
- Thames Valley, Hampshire and Isle of Wight: A4e and Maximus

== Criticism ==
=== Opposition to workfare ===
Some criticisms of the Work Programme reflect a more explicitly political objection to what these critics view as workfare. John Downie of the Scottish Council for Voluntary Services argues that workfare is effectively a "handout to business" whereby taxpayers are subsidising the wage bill of the private sector. Downie also argues that the Work Programme exploited unemployed people desperately seeking work, and that it further provided a disincentive for employers to create jobs. The anti-workfare group Boycott Workfare makes similar arguments stating that workfare replaces jobs and undermines wages.

=== Allegations of conflict of interest ===
The Guardian has reported that several high-profile donors to the Conservative Party have made money from workfare contracts. Sovereign Capital, a venture capital firm set up by John Nash (subsequently Lord Nash, Parliamentary Under Secretary of State for Schools 2013–2017) and Ryan Robinson owned Employment and Skills Group. ESG was awarded a £73 million workfare contract.

=== Failures to create a viable market ===
In November 2013 Deloitte sold its 50% stake in the Work Programme contractor Ingeus. Critics argue that this shows the government had failed to create a viable market in the welfare-to-work industry. Alastair Grimes from the consultancy Rocket Science stated: "I'm not aware of people who are making money out of the Work Programme". However Employment Minister Esther McVey argued that the sale shows the success of the Work Programme, with Deloitte exiting when their business was performing well.

=== Debate over effectiveness ===
A 2012 report found that only 18,270 people out of 785,000 people enrolled on the Work Programme had held down employment for six months or more – a success rate of 2.3%. Given that 5% of the long-term unemployed would be expected to find employment if left to their own devices the Work Programme can be considered less successful than doing nothing at all. However, Employment Minister Mark Hoban argued that "as the Work Programme supports people for two years or more ... it is too early to judge Work Programme performance by Job Outcome and Sustainment Payment data alone."

In February 2013 the Public Accounts Committee of the House of Commons revealed that the Work Programme had only got 3.6% of participants off benefits and into secure employment during the first fourteen months of its operation. The Department for Work and Pensions had set a target of 11.9%. The Chairman of the PAC Margaret Hodge described the performance of the Work Programme as "extremely poor". In May 2013 the House of Commons' Work and Pensions Select Committee published a report critical of the Work Programme which described the performance of Work Programme contractors as variable in quality. The report also stated that specialist services dealing with problems such as drug dependency and homelessness were underused and that specialist subcontractors received a raw deal. In September 2013 A4E had its number of referrals cut for poor performance.

=== Lack of funding ===
A further analysis by the Public Accounts Committee found that the service that the Work Programme could offer was negatively affected by a lack of funding and that in some instances there was not enough money to provide interpreters to those with poor English language skills. The report suggested that the level of support that the Work Programme could offer was reduced by the sheer number of people requiring help.

The report stated:

Particular issues reported as resulting from a lack of funding included an inability to pay for interpreters and for participant transport in rural areas. Some subcontractors felt this also affected their ability to meet the needs of particular groups of participants.

=== Impact on charity sector ===
The Work Programme was blamed for the closure of some charities who criticised the way in which WP contracts were structured.

=== Drafting of legislation ===
The workfare element of the Work Programme was ruled ultra vires in a 2013 Court of Appeal judgment which stated that the Jobseeker's Allowance (Employment, Skills and Enterprise Scheme) Regulations 2011 did not describe the employment schemes to which they apply, as is required by the primary legislation. The Secretary of State for Work and Pensions Iain Duncan Smith responded to the Court of Appeal judgment by announcing emergency legislation in order to correct this. He also appeared to attack the utility of geology as a profession when attacking unemployed geology graduate Cait Reilly who had challenged the workfare scheme. His remarks were criticised by the Geological Society of London.

=== Payment-by-results ===
It has been argued that payment-by-results whereby companies only get paid for finding people work meant that they focussed on the "easiest" cases among the long-term unemployed with the most "difficult" effectively sidelined. The term "creaming and parking" has been used to describe this process. The Department for Work and Pensions denied that "parking" was an issue. A study by the Third Sector Research Centre at Birmingham University found widespread "gaming" of the Work Programme by private sector providers. They argue that because providers were not paid until an unemployed person had been in work for two years it made little economic sense to concentrate on the most "difficult cases". The study also found that the largest private sector providers known as "primes" were guilty of passing more difficult cases onto sub-contractors. Furthermore, "parking" meant that charities were not getting referrals under the Work Programme as such customers were not considered likely to result in a payment for the provider.

One interviewee told the study:

"It's not being PC but I'll just say it as it is … you tend to get left with the rubbish; people who aren't going to get a job … If the [prime] thought they could get them a job, they wouldn't [refer them to] someone else to get a job."

Former COO of Ingeus Richard Johnson, writing in The Guardian, argued that the tendering process for Work Programme contracts meant that those companies that submitted the cheapest tenders were successful, something that encouraged "parking and creaming". Those driven to submit the cheapest tenders did not have any other business outside of welfare to work and either secured Work Programme contracts or closed. Discounts on the base price of over 30% were offered by some bidders, but with the discounts kicking in during the later years of the contract - when the financial viability of the contracts could be at risk.

== See also ==
- Youth unemployment in the United Kingdom
- Graduate unemployment in the United Kingdom
- Workhouses in the United Kingdom
