= Work Choice =

UK government program

Work Choice was a voluntary Department for Work and Pensions (DWP) programme which was intended to support disabled people who may have faced barriers to employment or risked losing their job due to their disability. It was introduced in England, Wales, and Scotland in October 2010 and closed in March 2019.

== History ==
Work Choice was introduced in October 2010, replacing WORKSTEP and Work Preparation programs. The UK Government hoped the program would support around 23,000 severely disabled people each year. The program was designed to cover all steps of the work finding journey and contracts were made with prime providers to support individuals on the program. Employers were able to claim a payment of up to £2,275 when they recruited a disabled person through Work Choice.

Upon its launch in 2010, Maria Miller admitted that the uptake of the scheme wasn't as high as the Department for Work and Pensions (DWP) expected, with updated figures estimating that 16,000 individuals would be supported each year.

When the scheme closed in 2019, funding was allocated to Access to Work, enabling businesses who hired individuals on the Work Choice scheme to receive £5,000 funding for two years. Work Choice was succeeded by Work and Health Programme.
