= New Deal (United Kingdom) =

Workfare programme in the United Kingdom

The New Deal (renamed Flexible New Deal from October 2009) was a workfare programme introduced in the United Kingdom by the first New Labour government in 1998, initially funded by a one-off £5 billion windfall tax on privatised utility companies. The stated purpose was to reduce unemployment by providing training, subsidised employment and voluntary work to the unemployed. Spending on the New Deal was £1.3 billion in 2001.

The New Deal was a cornerstone of New Labour and devised mainly by LSE Professor Richard Layard, who has since been elevated to the House of Lords as a Labour peer. It was based on similar workfare models in Sweden, which Layard has spent much of his academic career studying.

== Purpose ==
The New Deal had, as its signature, the power to withdraw benefits from those who 'refused reasonable employment'. 'Workfare' in the UK can arguably be traced back to 1986, and compulsory 'Restart' interviews for claimants after a certain period, and as such the first introduction of 'conditionalities' with the possible outcome of 'sanctions' for perceived non-compliance. The 'New Deal' replaced the previous workfare programme of the then-Conservative government of John Major, 'Project Work', which had been launched in the early 90s.

A further project was introduced in 1999, the Working Families Tax Credit, a tax credit scheme for low income workers which was meant to provide an incentive to work, and to continue in work.

Professor Richard Beaudry, from the Department of Economics at the University of York, defined the New Deal as follows in a 2002 paper, Workfare and Welfare: Britain’s New Deal (pp. 8–9) : "The New Deal reforms promise eventual reform of welfare assistance for all benefit recipients."

== New Deal Programmes ==
Although originally targeting the young unemployed (18- to 24-year-olds), the New Deal programmes subsequently targeted other groups. These include:

- New Deal for Young People (NDYP) received by far the greatest proportion of New Deal funding (£3.15 billion through to 2002 ). It targeted unemployed youth (aged 18–24) unemployed for 6 months or longer.
- New Deal 25+ targeted those aged at least 25 years who were unemployed for eighteen months or more. In terms of funding, £350 million was allocated up to 2002.
- New Deal for Lone Parents targeted single parents with school age children. £200 million was directly allocated to the program, not including additional assistance for child-care.
- New Deal for the Disabled targeted those with disabilities in receipt of Incapacity and similar benefits. £200 million was budgeted for the program up to 2002 (Peck, “Workfare” 304-305). This was superseded by the 'Work Capability Assessment', introduced by the Brown government in 2008, and administered by Atos Healthcare.
- New Deal 50+ targeted those aged 50 and older.
- New Deal for Musicians was a little-known element aimed at unemployed musicians.

== Referral procedure ==
The greatest emphasis of the first New Labour government was the NDYP, which was a pilot phase for more ambitious New Deal reforms with other groups. The NDYP began with an initial compulsory 'consultation session', referred to as 'Gateway', that focused on improving job search and interview skills. This training was provided by a third-party organisation from the workfare industry such as a4e, a quango such as CSV or a charity spin-off such as YMCA Training. If an employment search still proved unsuccessful after the Gateway sessions, to continue to receive Job Seeker's Allowance, one of four options had to be chosen:

- A subsidised job placement. The subsidy being £60 per week, and lasting 6 months; a £750 training allowance was also available to participants. Those taking part were not paid wages.
- Full-time education and training, for up to 12 months.
- Work in the voluntary sector, called the 'Community Task Force': those taking part were paid JSA plus a £15 training allowance.
- Work with the Environmental Task Force.(DWP website; Peck, “Workfare” 304; Glyn 53)

Participation in one of the four options was mandatory in order to be still able to claim JSA, refusal to participate led to 'sanctions' - withdrawal of JSA, and referral to a 'Decision Maker' who decided the outcome of 'sanctions' on the claimant.

== Flexible New Deal ==
A new scheme, called the 'Flexible New Deal', was introduced in October 2009, aimed at revamping the programme that had, by then, been in existence for more than a decade. Following the formation of the Conservative-led coalition government after the General Election of May 2010, Tory minister Chris Grayling announced the end of the New Deal that October. Grayling said the scheme had cost over £31,000 per job placement. Although the figure quoted was correct at the time, the project was front-loaded with costs and lagged in results; given another 11 months, the cost per head would have been roughly half of the quoted figure. The New Deal was replaced in the Summer of 2011 by the Coalition Government's Single Work Programme.

== Steps to Work ==
Steps to Work was the replacement for the New Deal in Northern Ireland and is still in existence. It is administered by the Department for Employment and Learning through its Jobs and Benefits Office. Steps to Work came into effect in 2008 and consists of largely the same provisions as the New Deal with the exception that payment by the Department is now more focused towards employment outcomes – and thus payment to workfare third parties – than previously.

== Criticisms ==
Critics claim that participants failed to see the value in the programmes and the programmes were not effective in equipping participants for work.

== See also ==
- Centrelink (Australia)
- Jobseeker's Allowance (United Kingdom)
- Jobcentre Plus (United Kingdom)
- Poor Law Amendment Act 1834 (United Kingdom)
- Personal Responsibility and Work Opportunity Act (United States)
- Welfare
- Welfare in the United Kingdom
- Work for the dole (Australia)
- Workfare
- Workfare in the United Kingdom
- Work Programme (United Kingdom)
