= Emma Harrison (businesswoman) =

English entrepreneur (born 1963)

- Born: Emma Cridland; 1964; Colchester, Essex, England
- Education: University of Bradford
- Known for: Former chairman, A4e

Emma Louise Harrison CBE (née Cridland), (born 13 August 1963) was a key shareholder of A4e (Action for employment) and the company's chairperson until 24 February 2012. Harrison's father, Roy Cridland, founded the company A4e before appointing Harrison as a director of the business in 1991 when the company was worth £125,000.

== Biography ==
She is a graduate engineer (BEng) of the University of Bradford.

She was appointed as a voluntary troubled families 'Family Champion' by Prime Minister David Cameron in 2010, despite civil servants recommending propriety and ethics checks on her. Harrison resigned from the post on 23 February 2012, following allegations of fraud at A4e and controversy over her £8.6m personal dividend payment. On 29 February 2012, David Cameron announced he had launched an inquiry into her appointment, saying he had not been aware of fraud allegations at A4e when he appointed her.

== Payments from A4e ==
In February 2012, it was revealed that Harrison was paid an £8.6 million dividend on her shares in 2011, in addition to her £365,000 annual salary. The payment was criticised by former Secretary of State for Work and Pensions and current Chair of the Public Accounts Committee Margaret Hodge as "ripping off the State".

On 25 February it emerged that in addition to her £365,000 annual salary and £8.6m shares dividend, A4e also paid Harrison and her partner around £1.7m over two years for leasing properties, including their 20-bedroom stately home, to her own firm.

== Resignation from A4e ==
On 24 February 2012, Harrison announced her resignation as Chairman of A4e, stating, "I do not want the continuing media focus on me to be any distraction for A4e..." In March 2015 six former employees were jailed for forging files in a scam that cost the taxpayer almost £300,000. Another four ex-members of staff received suspended prison sentences for what Judge Angela Morris said were "deceitful and unscrupulous" practices. They had falsified employer details, time sheets and job-seeker signatures to inflate the numbers they said they had helped into work.

== Media ==
Emma Harrison has appeared in Channel 4's Make me a Million and Series 1 of The Secret Millionaire. While behind the bar in a working men's club in the London Borough of Barking and Dagenham for the show, she heard racist language that made her feel "physically sick" and she left after two and a half hours.

== Awards ==
Harrison was appointed Commander of the Order of the British Empire (CBE) in the 2010 New Year Honours.

She has received honorary doctorates from the University of Derby (2007), Sheffield Hallam University (2008), and the University of Bradford (2008).

== Charity work ==
Emma Harrison was a trustee of the Eden Project (registered charity no. 1093070)

== Family ==
She is married to Jim Harrison, founder and chairman of Thornbridge Brewery, They have four children and have homes in London and at Thornbridge Hall, Derbyshire.
