= Mandatory Work Activity =

Workfare programme in the UK

Mandatory Work Activity (MWA) was a workfare programme in the United Kingdom whereby individuals had to work for their benefits or risk being "sanctioned" and losing them. MWA started in May 2011, but in November 2015 the DWP confirmed it was "not renewing" it. An academic analysis by the Department for Work and Pensions cast doubt on the effectiveness of MWA, and despite finding "little evidence" that workfare improved claimants gaining paid employment, the DWP ignored the findings of the study, and in June 2012, the scheme received a £5m expansion. A similar but little-known scheme "Jobseeker Mandatory Activity" (JMA) was piloted by New Labour in 2006, but did not last beyond 2008. JMA targeted those claimants 25 and over, who had been unemployed for 6 months or more and made claimants liable to "sanction" for non-compliance.

== Legal challenge to the scheme, and retrospective legislation ==
The legality of the scheme was indirectly challenged in the case Caitlin Reilly and Jamieson Wilson v Secretary of State for Work and Pensions. The High Court partially found in the claimants' favour; they then appealed to the Court of Appeal, which ruled in February 2013 that the 2011 Regulations "were unlawful and that the Secretary of State had acted beyond the powers given to him by Parliament by failing to provide any detail about the various 'Back to Work' schemes in the Regulations".

The Department for Work and Pensions appealed to the Supreme Court of the United Kingdom. Meanwhile, it also drafted new regulations to ensure the continuance of the work placements. During the period of the scheme which had been ruled unlawful, perhaps 300,000 people had had benefits of an average of around £530–570 withheld, totalling around £130m which the DWP was potentially obliged to repay if Reilly and Wilson won their case in the Supreme Court. The Government sought to avoid having to make these repayments by retrospectively changing the law through the Jobseekers (Back to Work Schemes) Bill, which became law on 26 March 2013.

However, Mandatory Work Activity was created under its own set of regulations so though the ruling touched on many of the same issues and the Jobseekers (Back to Work Schemes) Act amended the regulatory foundation of the scheme, it was not directly affected by the outcome of the Court of Appeal ruling.

The law firm acting for Reilly and Wilson, Public Interest Lawyers, reportedly lodged submissions to the supreme court, arguing that "the actions of the secretary of state ... represent a clear violation of article 6 of the European convention on human rights and the rule of law, as an interference in the judicial process by the legislature".

== Legal challenge to non-disclosure of participating organisations ==
The Department for Work and Pensions worked to keep secret the list of organisations participating in the MWA scheme. A freedom of information request submitted around March 2012 resulted in a first-tier tribunal ruling in May 2013 that the DWP must reveal these names. The deadline for appeals expired in October 2013. A provisional list of organisations using workfare has been collected by the Boycott Workfare campaign.

== 2016 Court of Appeal ruling and disclosure ==
The DWP spent four years attempting to block the release of the names of "placement providers": three successive appeals following as many court rulings ordering they be made public culminated in July 2016 with the Court of Appeal ruling against the DWP's attempts to keep them a secret, the lists revealing the names of 534 "placement provider" organisations.

== See also ==
- Boycott Workfare
- Economic oppression
- Refusal of work
- Unfree labour
- Wage slavery
- Work Programme
- Workfare in the United Kingdom
