= Workfare in the United Kingdom =

System of welfare regulations

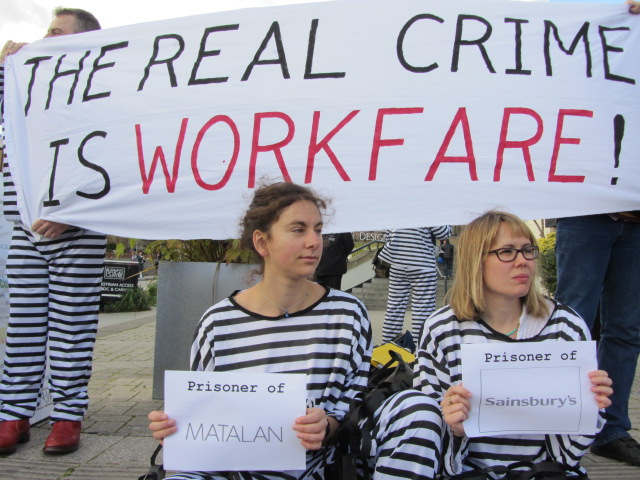
British activists dressed as prisoners demonstrating against workfare (October 2011)

Workfare in the United Kingdom is a system of welfare regulations put into effect by UK governments at various times. Individuals subject to workfare must undertake work in return for their welfare benefit payments or risk losing them. Workfare policies are politically controversial. Supporters claim that such policies help people move off welfare and into employment whereas critics argue that they are analogous to slavery or indentured servitude and counterproductive in decreasing unemployment.

== History ==
The 1971 Family Income Supplement required payslips as proof of work. It was replaced in 1986 by Family Credit, which in 1999 was replaced by Working Families Tax Credit, replaced in 2003 by Child Tax Credit and Working Tax Credit, which was absorbed into Universal Credit by 2018.

Welfare-to-work or "active labour market policies" first appeared in the early 1980s at time of mass unemployment. The Manpower Services Commission, a non-departmental public body had been created by the Heath government in the early 1970s whilst full employment existed. It ran the Youth Opportunities Programme which was introduced by the Callaghan Labour government in the late 1970s and was continued and extended by the incoming Conservative government, being replaced in 1983 by the better-known Youth Training Scheme (YTS).

"Workfare" began in the UK in the early 1990s with the first Major government's "Community Action" scheme in 1993 which was replaced in 1996 by the better known "Project Work" which was subsequently replaced by New Labour's "New Deal". Welfare-to-work or "active labour market policies" date back to 1986 and the second Thatcher government's introduction of compulsory "Restart" interviews for unemployed claimants; restart lasted until 1991 when it was superseded by the "make work" scheme "Employment Action" which lasted until 1993. However, the "Make work schemes" are not workfare, but they are a component part of policies such as welfare-to-work, "active labour market policies" and "welfare reform".

The distinction between workfare and "make work schemes" is that workfare is "work for benefits", either for a company in the public sector, or what has been called "bogus volunteering" for a charity. The work is undertaken as a condition of being able to claim social security payments such as unemployment benefit. This is in contrast to arrangements where claimants receive social security payments plus "a small supplemental payment".

Although workfare did exist in the 2000s under the New Labour government, it was not widely publicised nor widely used.

In 1999, the UK charity Child Poverty Action Group expressed concern that a government announcement that single parents and the disabled may have to attend repeated interviews for jobs under threat of losing benefits was "a step towards a US-style workfare system". The Social Security Secretary at the time, Alistair Darling, described the plan as "harsh, but justifiable", claiming that it would help address the "poverty of expectation" of many claimants.

In 2008, research undertaken by the Centre for Regional Economic and Social Research for the Department for Work and Pensions found that there was little evidence that workfare programmes increased the likelihood of finding paid employment and could instead reduce the prospect of finding paid employment by "limiting the time available for job search and by failing to provide the skills and experience valued by employers". Despite the report, Lord Jones, former Minister of State for Trade and Investment, said in April 2010 that Britain needed to adopt American-style workfare.

In the early 2010s under the Conservative-led coalition government workfare became widely used and widely known.

In November 2011, the Prime Minister's Office announced proposals under which Jobseeker's Allowance claimants who had not found a job once they had been through a work programme would do a 26-week placement in the community for 30 hours a week. According to The Guardian in 2012, under the Government's Community Action Programme people who had been out of work for a number of years "must work for six months unpaid, including at profit-making businesses, in order to keep their benefits".

In a freedom of information response issued in January 2013, the Department for Work and Pensions stated that it "did not operate any "workfare programme(s)" or a "workfare scheme". A large scale opposition movement led to dozens of organizations withdrawing from what were then seven different schemes. This was reduced to five schemes after the Department for Work and Pensions announced in November 2015 that it was "not renewing" two of the schemes, "Community Work Placements" and "Mandatory Work Activity".

During their 2013 annual conference the Conservative Party announced a new scheme, called Help to Work, the workfare aspect of which "Community Work Placements" expected claimants to work for up to 30 hours a week for 26 weeks in return for Jobseeker's Allowance (JSA). The scheme was introduced in April 2014, but scrapped in November 2015.

== Schemes ==
A number of different workfare schemes have been introduced in the UK. The anti-workfare group Boycott Workfare list eight schemes involving the risk of benefit loss (directly and indirectly).

- Help to Work (2014–2015)
- Mandatory Work Activity (2011–2015)
- Work Programme (2011–2017)
- Community Action Programme
- Sector-Based Work Academies
- Work Experience
- Steps to Work (Northern Ireland only)
- Day One Support for Young People Trailblazer
- Derbyshire "Trailblazer" Mandatory Youth Activity Programme

== Support ==
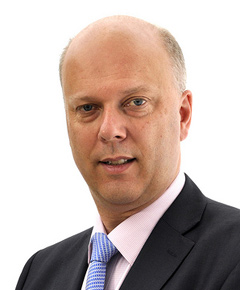
Chris Grayling supported workfare policies as a means of tackling unemployment.

Chris Grayling, the UK's Minister for Employment between 2010 and 2012, criticised what he called the "Polly Toynbee left", saying that they failed to understand the modern labour market.

=== Research ===
A 2005 study suggested that workfare policies were more effective at increasing wages when the associated benefits were relatively generous. In 1999, Family Credit was replaced by the "substantially" more generous (Note: Covering approximately 400,000 more families, with a gentler withdrawal rate and higher average payments.) Working Families' Tax Credit (WFTC). The study found that the introduction of WFTC was associated with higher wage growth compared with Family Credit. However, the effect was uneven: individuals with earnings low enough to qualify under both schemes experienced slower wage growth.

Another analysis of WFTC published in 2001 concluded that the policy was associated with an overall increase in employment. However, the study also suggested that it may have created incentives for some individuals to leave the workforce. For example, some women in low-income households could experience lower overall household income if they entered employment and became ineligible for WFTC, while leaving employment could increase household income in certain cases.

The same research also examined the 1998 New Deal programme. In its initial stage, participants received their usual benefit payments while undertaking four months of assisted job search and basic skills training. The analysis found that about 5% more participants obtained employment than would otherwise have been expected. The authors noted that part of this effect might have resulted from later wage subsidies within the programme; after accounting for this, they estimated that the programme increased the number of participants obtaining unsubsidised jobs by at least 1%.

Researchers have noted that these policy changes occurred shortly after the introduction of the national minimum wage in 1998, which may have influenced the observed results.

== Criticism ==
The Trades Union Congress, a federation of trade unions in the United Kingdom, has stated that workfare is exploitation of the unemployed, "paying" them below the minimum wage. The Trades Union Congress also highlight that workfare is unfair to paid workers who find themselves in competition with unpaid workers. In these cases the TUC claims that the result would be job losses and the deterioration of pay, overtime or other conditions. Employers who opted not to use workfare workers would also find themselves competing with other firms who are "effectively being subsidised".

The Guardian newspaper claimed in February 2012 that businesses in the UK which take staff via "work for your benefits programmes" included Asda, Maplin, Primark, Holland & Barrett, Boots, and McDonald's. The policy is similar to that which the Conservative Party administration hoped to introduce in the mid to late 1990s, which would most likely have been carried through had John Major not been defeated by Tony Blair in the 1997 general election.

Critics also ascertain that the majority of menial, low paid jobs would end up being carried out by people on workfare who, because they are working but unpaid, would not be counted among the unemployment figures. In an article in the Huffington Post, Dr Simon Duffy likened workfare to slavery. The Green Party of England and Wales has also voiced its opposition to workfare.

Academics have argued that, as workfare participants are essentially providing work that is beneficial to the employer, whether public or private, they should be granted employment status (as a worker or an employee) or, at least, employment protection, even regardless of status.

=== Research ===
A 2008 review by the Department for Work and Pensions found has cast doubt on the effectiveness of workfare policies. After surveying evidence available from America, Canada, and Australia, the report states:

There is little evidence that workfare increases the likelihood of finding work. It can even reduce employment chances by limiting the time available for job search and by failing to provide the skills and experience valued by employers. Subsidised ("transitional") job schemes that pay a wage can be more effective in raising employment levels than 'work for benefit' programmes. Workfare is least effective in getting people into jobs in weak labour markets where unemployment is high.

However, this report - now over a decade old - notes there was a limited pool of evidence.

=== Opposition ===
Opposition to workfare has caused a number of companies to withdraw from "workfare" schemes. A number of organisations including Maplin, Waterstones, Sainsbury's, TK Maxx and the Arcadia Group withdrew from the scheme in early 2012. Argos and Superdrug announced they were suspending their involvement pending talks with ministers. Clothing retailer Matalan subsequently suspended its involvement in the scheme in order to conduct a review of the terms of such placements, with a spokesman for the Department for Work and Pensions saying "The scheme is voluntary and no one is forced to take part and the threat of losing the benefit only starts once a week has passed on the placement - this was designed to provide certainty to employers and the individuals taking part"

In response, Employment Minister Chris Grayling stated to BBC Radio 4 that workfare programs were voluntary and accused the Socialist Workers' Party of false campaigning.

== Controversies ==
=== Tesco ===
There was controversy later in February 2012 following the involvement of the Tesco supermarket chain in a government workfare scheme linked to the payment of benefits. An advert appeared on the Jobseekers' Plus website in which Tesco sought permanent workers in exchange for expenses and Jobseeker's Allowance. After the advert was highlighted by users of Facebook and Twitter, the supermarket claimed its appearance was a mistake and that it was intended to be "an advert for work experience with a guaranteed job interview at the end of it as part of a Government-led work experience scheme". A protest about this advert later caused the temporary closure of a Tesco store near the Houses of Parliament.

=== Poundland ===
The discount retailer Poundland's participation in a workfare scheme has been controversial. A graduate took the Department for Work and Pensions to Court arguing that participation in a workfare scheme was a breach of her human rights guaranteed by the European Convention on Human Rights. Caitlin Reilly and Jamieson Wilson lost the case but the decision was reversed on appeal. However, the appeal decision was made primarily on technical grounds, and the judge found no breach of Article 4 of the European Convention on Human Rights.

=== Home Retail Group ===
Home Retail Group, the parent company of Argos and Homebase, were also widely criticised for their involvement in Workfare. It was reported they would not offer jobs to people who successfully completed the scheme (with Argos simply issuing certificates of completion to those wanting jobs). A key moment for those who opposed Workfare was when a poster produced for internal purposes by Homebase indicating that unpaid work in the scheme was a way of reducing operating costs was leaked to the public. After this, Home Retail Group soon announced they would stop participating in the scheme.

== See also ==
- Boycott Workfare
- Economic oppression
- Exploitation of labour
- Forced labour
- Involuntary servitude
- Refusal of work
- Unfree labour
- Wage slavery
- Work ethic
- Workhouses in the United Kingdom
- Youth unemployment in the United Kingdom
