= Sector Based Work Academies =

The sector-based work academy programme (SWAP or SBWA) is a UK government scheme launched in 2013, which is intended to help create a skilled workforce in a business sector. Sector-based work academies help prepare people receiving unemployment benefits to apply for jobs in a new or different area of work. Work placements take place, which are designed to meet the business's immediate and future recruitment needs as well as to recruit a workforce with the right skills to sustain and grow the company's business. SWAP is administered by Jobcentre Plus and available in England and Scotland. A sector-based work academy can last for up to 6 weeks.

Placements have 3 main components:

- pre-employment training – matched to the needs of the host business sector, including CV writing, interview techniques and workplace etiquette
- a work experience placement
- a guaranteed job interview or help with an employer's recruitment process

The scheme is a government workfare programme.

In Scotland the programme is funded through the Scottish government or other partner organisations. A similar programme is available through the Welsh government’s Employability Skills Programme for applicants in Wales.
