= Jobseekers (Back to Work Schemes) Act 2013 =

Public General Act of Parliament of the United Kingdom

- Act of Parliament
- Parliament of the United Kingdom
- Long title: An Act to make provision about the effect of certain provisions relating to participation in a scheme designed to assist persons to obtain employment and about notices relating to participation in such a scheme.
- Citation: 2013 c. 17
- Introduced by: Iain Duncan Smith MP, Secretary of State for Work and Pensions (Commons); Lord Freud (Lords)

Dates
- Royal assent: 26 March 2013

Status: Amended

History of passage through Parliament

Text of statute as originally enacted

Text of the Jobseekers (Back to Work Schemes) Act 2013 as in force today (including any amendments) within the United Kingdom, from legislation.gov.uk.

The Jobseekers (Back to Work Schemes) Act 2013 (c. 17) was an emergency act of Parliament of the United Kingdom introduced to the House of Commons in March 2013. It retrospectively changed the law to make past actions of the government which the courts had found unlawful to be lawful. As of July 2014, the Act has been found to contravene Article 6 of the European Convention on Human Rights.

== Content and passage of the Bill ==
Related to programmes through the United Kingdom's Coalition Government's "Work Programme", created by the Department for Work and Pensions (DWP), the Jobseeker's (Back to Work Schemes) Bill addressed situations where Jobseeker's Allowance claimants may be asked to work without pay in some circumstances.

The Bill was drafted as a direct result of a court case against the Government lodged by Caitlin Reilly and Jamieson Wilson. They won their case that the "Work Programme" schemes had not been enacted and implemented entirely lawfully, implying that the state should repay benefits unlawfully withheld from claimants. The DWP reacted to confirm that existing regulations would be tightened up to retain the scheme, saying that only those "serious in finding work" would continue to claim benefits.

Secretary of State Iain Duncan Smith confirmed in media interviews that the Jobseeker's (Back to Work Schemes) Bill was drafted in reaction to the court case, as he wanted to deal with people he said thought they "were too good" for such schemes. The Bill was introduced before the appeal process in Reilly and Jamieson's case was complete. The Bill was "introduced to avoid the need to repay claimants who have been sanctioned for failure to comply with requirements under the ESE Regulations". "ESE Regulations" are those contained in the Jobseeker's Allowance (Employment, Skills and Enterprise Scheme) Regulations 2011.

The process for drafting and debating the Bill received criticism, as it would effectively reverse the court of appeal's decision and penalise people who were not acting unlawfully at the time. Civil rights organisations linked such moves with oppressive regimes.

=== Progress through Parliament ===
The Bill was 'fast-tracked' through parliament, with the consequence that it was not possible for the Joint Committee on Human Rights to scrutinise it. The House of Lords Constitutional Committee, moreover, 'concluded that the government had not advanced a good rationale for the Bill to be fast-tracked'.

Minister for Disabled People Esther McVey said the Bill was about 'giving jobseekers the best possible way to find employment'. The "second reading" stage was passed by 277 votes to 57. Forty members of the opposition Labour Party opposed the Bill. The Labour Party largely abstained from voting on the Bill, which was seen as effectively supporting the measure.

The second reading of the Bill in the House of Lords attracted a number of scathing comments from legislators for its retrospective changing of the law, allowing benefits claimants to be penalised for actions which had proved legal at the time when they were taken.

The Bill passed its third reading in the Commons by 263 votes to 52 on 19 March 2013.

== Appeal against the bill ==
The law firm acting for Reilly and Wilson, Public Interest Lawyers, lodged submissions to the Supreme Court, arguing that "the actions of the secretary of state ... represent a clear violation of article 6 of the European Convention on Human Rights and the rule of law, as an interference in the judicial process by the legislature". On Friday 4 July 2014, Mrs Justice Lang, sitting at the High Court in London, ruled that the retrospective nature of the legislation interfered with Reilly's right to a fair trial under Article 6. The government announced that it would appeal this ruling, and did not in the meantime make any payouts. On 29 April 2016, the appeal came before the Court of Appeal, which upheld the previous court's decision; Lord Justice Underhill, summarising the court's findings, emphasised that although the Act was incompatible with the European Convention on Human Rights, "it is up to the Government, subject to any further appeal, to decide what action to take in response".

== Remedial order ==
Jobseekers (Back to Work Schemes) Act 2013 (Remedial) Order 2020
- Statutory Instrument
- Citation: 2020 No. 1085
- Territorial extent: Great Britain

Dates
- Made: 2 October 2020
- Laid before Parliament: 3 October 2020
Other legislation
Amends	Jobseekers (Back to Work Schemes) Act 2013
Made under	Human Rights Act 1998

Status: Current legislation

Text of the Jobseekers (Back to Work Schemes) Act 2013 as in force today (including any amendments) within the United Kingdom, from legislation.gov.uk.

The incompatibility of the act with the European Convention on Human Rights was eventually resolved when Parliament approved the Jobseekers (Back to Work Schemes) Act 2013 (Remedial) Order 2020 (SI 2020/1085), a remedial order under the Human Rights Act 1998. The order inserted two new sections into the act to restore the position of claimants who had pending appeals on 26 March 2013, and to allow the Secretary of State to administratively remake their decision where these claimants' appeals had been finally rejected since then.
