= PeoplePlus =

British employability and education provider

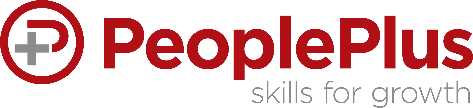
- Industry: Training Education Employability
- Founded: 2015
- Headquarters: Sheffield, United Kingdom
- Products: Apprenticeships, Corporate Training, Recruitment, E-Learning, Adult Education, Prison Education
- Number of employees: 1500+
- Parent: Swipejobs
- Website: peopleplus.co.uk

PeoplePlus is an employability and education provider headquartered in Sheffield, United Kingdom. The company provides employability and education services. It is owned by Swipejobs.

== Leadership ==
The Chief Executive Officer of PeoplePlus is Kenny Boyle, who joined the organisation in 2018.

== History ==
PeoplePlus originally operated as part of the Staffline Group. In 2018, PeoplePlus acquired the apprenticeship business of LearnDirect. In 2019, the company announced a four-year contract to provide prison education services in England and Scotland. PeoplePlus was acquired by Swipejobs in 2025.
