= Help to Work =

UK government scheme

Help to Work was a government workfare scheme in the United Kingdom for individuals who had not found work after two years on the Work Programme. Help to Work was the overall name for Community Work Placements and other intensified "activation" measures, and was launched at the start of 2014, but it was announced in November 2015, that the DWP was "not renewing" it. Referrals to Community Work Placements ended in March 2016, with contracts ending by October. All other referrals ended in March 2017.

Individuals who refused to participate in the scheme faced sanctions usually involving full withdrawal of jobless benefits for fixed periods.

== Pilot ==
A study of a pilot of the "Help to Work" scheme carried out by the National Institute of Economic and Social Research reached the following conclusion:

The good news: Help to Work reduced benefit receipt and increased employment among participants. The not so good news (but no surprise to those of us who know the literature): not by very much, and overall outcomes were still pretty bad.

== Criticism ==
Richard Godwin writing in the Evening Standard criticised the scheme as "slavery by another name".

== See also ==
- Help to Buy
