= Seetec =

Training provider in the UK and Ireland

Seetec (South East Essex Technology Centre) is a training provider in the United Kingdom and Ireland.

Founded in 1984 as a company limited by guarantee and registered charity, Seetec was originally established to deliver IT training to the unemployed through government funded and private provision.

Seetec programmes include apprenticeships, Train to Gain, New Deal for disabled people, Work Choice, Pathways to Work and Work Programme.

== History ==
Seetec was established in 1984. Its directors were from Essex County Council, Rochford District Council and four private sponsors from the IT industry: Access (now Mastercard), British Telecom (BT), International Computers Ltd (now Fujitsu) and Sony.

In 1989 Seetec Business Technology Centre Ltd was formed, taking over the operational contracts and services of the original company. An employee-owned business since January 2020, it operates across the UK and Ireland, with its head office in Essex.

On 1 February 2015 the Ministry of Justice transferred ownership of the Kent, Surrey and Sussex Community Rehabilitation Company (KSS CRC) to Seetec. In May 2016 Seetec acquired Outsource Training and Development, a London-based training provider with experience of delivering training in key industries, including media and marketing, aviation and logistics.

In February 2019, the Ministry of Justice appointed Seetec to deliver probation services in South West England and Wales. On 1 April Seetec acquired Pluss CIC, an employability community interest company.

In June 2019 Seetec confirmed the start of its latest business line Seetec Pluss Ltd, responsible for managing Work and Health programme contracts previously delivered by Pluss CIC in addition to DWP ESF sub contracts. In August 2019 Seetec Outsource Training and Skills Ltd had started trading, delivering apprenticeship and skills training across the UK.

In January 2020, founder and 80 per cent shareholder Peter Cooper sold 51 per cent of the company into an Employee Ownership Trust for the benefit of the company's 2,500 employees. This is in addition to an existing employee benefit trust established in 1990 which owns 18 per cent of the company, and the 1.5 per cent stake held by the charity Your Ambition. Retaining a 29 per cent stake in the business, Cooper announced in January 2020 his decision to step down as executive chairman, with the intention to chair the main board as a non-executive director. John Baumback took over executive leadership of the company as the group managing director as of 1 April 2020.

== Services ==
Seetec delivers apprenticeships and skills development programmes across a range of UK industries. Employer services include workforce and apprenticeship recruitment and Apprenticeship Levy management. Seetec also delivers employability support, advice and guidance to individuals who are out of work, helping them to find sustainable employment.

Seetec's justice division works with prisons, government and criminal justice agencies to rehabilitation offenders.

== Criticisms ==
Critics of the company have accused it of being insensitive to the needs of disabled individuals who are referred to its programmes. Along with other job-creation companies, Seetec has been criticized for operating on a per head business model, where the company receives a fixed payment for each person it routes off of the welfare rolls and back to work.
