= Boycott Workfare =

British campaign group

Boycott Workfare is a British campaign group that has opposed "workfare" policies in the United Kingdom. The group's campaigning has been very successful in making companies and charities pull out of "workfare". In January 2014 the group lodged freedom of information requests to investigate the use of workfare by local government. This led to responses from 271 councils, and the results were 62% of them had used unpaid workers during the past two years. This amounted to more than half a million hours of unpaid labour. As of August 2016, more than 50 organisations have ended their involvement in workfare, because of negative publicity.

Workfare is very closely linked to benefit sanctions, the temporary withdrawal or withholding of benefits payments by the DWP. This is imposed when the claimant is punished for failure to meet the contractual terms of the "workfare", or unpaid, work placement. A claimant has the right to appeal against this measure, under fixed guidelines.
