= Family Assistance Plan =

Welfare program

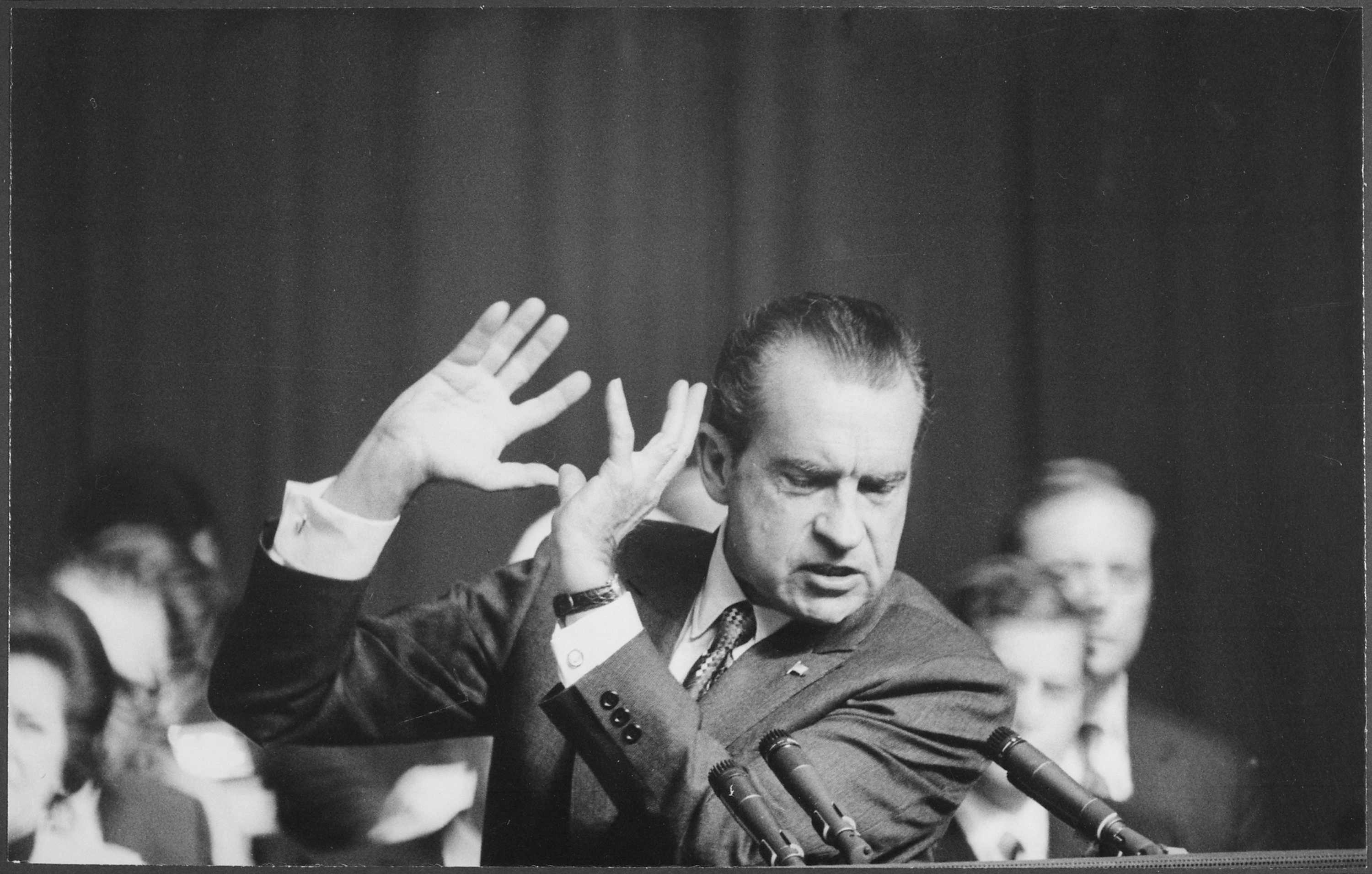
President Nixon delivering a speech in 1969 around the time the Family Assistance Plan was introduced

The Family Assistance Plan (FAP) was a welfare program introduced by President Richard Nixon in August 1969, which aimed to implement a negative income tax for households with working parents. The FAP was influenced by President Lyndon B. Johnson's War on Poverty program that aimed to expand welfare across all American citizens, especially for working-class Americans. Nixon intended for the FAP to replace existing welfare programs such as the Aid to Assist Families with Dependent Children (AFDC) program as a way to attract conservative voters that were beginning to become wary of welfare while maintaining middle-class constituencies. The FAP specifically provided aid assistance to working-class Americans, dividing benefits based on age, the number of children, family income, and eligibility. Initially, the Nixon administration thought the FAP legislation would easily pass through the House of Representatives and the more liberal Senate, as both chambers were controlled by the Democratic Party. In June 1971, the FAP under the bill H.R. 1 during the 92nd Congress, passed in the House of Representatives. However, from December 1971 to June 1972 H.R.1 bill that included the FAP underwent scrutiny in the Senate chamber, particularly by the Senate Finance Committee controlled by the conservative Democrats, while the Republicans were also reluctant on passing the program. Eventually, on October 5 of 1972, a revised version of H.R.1 passed the Senate with a vote of 68-5 that only authorized funding for FAP testing before its implementation. During House-Senate reconciliation, before Nixon signed the bill on October 15, 1972, the entire provision on FAP was dropped. The FAP enjoyed broad support from Americans across different regions. Reception towards the program varied across racial, regional, income, and gender differences. The FAP is best remembered for beginning the rhetoric against the expansion of welfare, an expansion that was popular since the New Deal. It initiated the support for anti-welfare conservative movements that became mainstream in American political discourse during the Reagan era.

The FAP was to be innovative in taking an income approach to welfare rather than a services approach. To the extent possible, money was not to be given to government agencies that would then determine what services the welfare system should provide. Money was to be given directly to beneficiaries, who would themselves decide on purchasing decisions. In effect, at least in its earliest drafts, it was to be a guaranteed basic income. At the time, this was seen by many as a momentous proposal. Michael Harrington, a prominent socialist of the time, called it "the most radical idea since the New Deal," and a Yugoslav Marxist is reported to have commented that "were it to pass, it might well be the most important social legislation in history in that it would finally free the individual and his family from the myriad and inescapable forms of coercion which society exerts through the employment nexus."

== Background ==
=== Need for the Family Assistance Program – controversy over the AFDC ===
When President Nixon took office in 1969, issues pertaining to poverty and welfare in the United States had been at the forefront of many political discussions, largely stemming from prior President Johnson's proclaimed a "War on Poverty" in 1964. Welfare and social insurance had been a federal responsibility as early as the 1930s when state-sponsored welfare was replaced with "social security" networks headed by the Federal government which included commonly considered aspects of welfare support such as unemployment benefits, workers' compensation, and veterans' payments. The Social Security Act of 1935 dictated welfare as a "layered system" in which five "layers" of income protection – ranging from private insurance, social insurance, and categorical assistance – acted to reduce the threats of poverty. Those that created the bill hoped that the act would create a dynamic that would not only reduce the amount of poverty in the nation but in doing also reduce the need for social insurance as more and more citizens became able to support themselves free of welfare aid.

However, by the 1960s, a program that had been created with the Social Security Act of 1935 to support families at risk, the AFDC (Aid to Assist Families with Dependant Children), had only continued to expand. From 1965 to 1970, the AFDC experienced an expansion of 110 percent, and its rapid growth had become a heated topic of debate for both the Democratic and Republican parties as welfare costs for the government increased. By the time Nixon came into the presidency, the projected cost of the AFDC was 6 billion dollars annually, straining already tight state and federal budgets. The rapid expansion of this program stemmed largely from the liberalization of its requirements through the 1950s and early 1960s, in which the eligible age for a child to be a dependant to 21, and the eligibility of families whose primary 'breadwinner' had been unemployed for long periods of time. At the time of Nixon's FAP speech in 1969, the primary beneficiaries of the AFDC were families who had undergone a breakup through divorce, desertion, or illegitimacy – which were decisively more common than families needing assistance for unavoidable hardships like the death of a father.

The rising costs and liberalization of the AFDC not only caused congressional backlash but also brought with it racially charged and negative responses by states burdened with increasing numbers of AFDC recipients. Indications within Congress and the public began to hint at a perception of rising welfare issues to be a largely minority or immigrant issue. Legislation was passed in Louisiana which declared children born out of wedlock or families cohabiting without an official marriage license to be inadmissible for AFDC benefits. Around 6,000 families were dropped, only 5% of whom were of Caucasian background. In 1961, aggravations revolving around the AFDC came to a head in the small town of Newburgh, New York in what popularly became known as the 'Battle of Newburgh'. Facing a sudden spike in welfare applicants due to tough economic conditions during the winter of 1961, City Manager Joseph McDowell Mitchell placed the blame on this rise in welfare costs primarily on immigration into the city. Mitchell proposed changes to the AFDC which included a requirement of proof that the beneficiary was entering Newburgh with a work position, a change to aid divvied out by voucher rather than cash, and denial of aid to those not working or to new children conceived while the family was receiving welfare assistance.

While Newburgh was only a small town of 30,000, the controversial proposals made by Mitchell received national attention, and polls conducted by Gallup showed that up to 74% of the population surveyed agreed with Mitchell that welfare should only be given to immigrants who came with a definite job opportunity and means of work. Further Gallup polls in 1964 found that over 50% of participants believed a 60-day residency should be required before an individual could be able to apply for AFDC welfare. Many also began to attribute the need for welfare as laziness, or a combination of misfortune and laziness. A common idea that began to spring up in discussions was the split between those 'deserving' or 'undeserving' of welfare. Highlighting this split was the notion that those 'undeserving' of welfare assistance were largely not working and instead coasting off of the benefits received. Some believed women were having children precisely to play the system and further the benefits they were receiving from AFDC. Indeed, this cultural divide between the deserving and undeserving would continue to underscore public opinion on welfare not only as the AFDC was debated, but in later moments as well in discussions of Nixon's FAP.

Despite public frustration and debates over adding restrictions to the AFDC to control costs, there was still a large number of the public who considered poverty aid to be a universal, basic right. A 1964 Harris poll found that 68% of participants believed the Federal government had a responsibility to ensure basic human rights and a minimum livable wage to its citizens, reaffirmed by 73% of participants in a later 1969 poll. Poverty and inequality had been raised as an issue by Johnson in 1964, and pressure was continuing to be placed on the Federal government to alleviate rising national poverty rates. Instances of riots and public disgruntlement plaguing the 1960s were connected to a welfare system not adequately supporting the needs of the population.

To many in Congress, it was clear that the answer was not to restrict the AFDC, but rather reform it. The AFDC was plagued with numerous inequalities not only among its recipients but between states. In 1968, 26 states did not pass the threshold for welfare support from the AFDC that allowed families to be above the 'poverty line'. Families in New Jersey could receive up to 332 dollars a month, whereas some families in Mississippi were receiving a comparatively meager 55 dollars a month. The AFDC also overwhelmingly denied access to assistance to families who had an employed head, even if their overall income still placed them below the poverty line. In 1966, this excluded around 12 million families from access to the AFDC. As such, there were fears that the AFDC created instances of dependency for those unable to work, as well as disincentivized families on welfare assistance to find work. In 1967, legislation pushed for a work-incentive phase (WIN) to AFDC, which required families currently on the program to participate in job/work training to continue receiving benefits. By early January 1969, the Nixon Administration had installed a committee to study the welfare system and propose changes, culminating in the eventual announcement of the FAP in August 1969. Nixon's plan envisioned a welfare system that ventured not only to fix welfare dependency and rising costs for the government, but also aimed to combat rising inequality within the welfare system and afford income assistance as a basic, universal right.

=== Nixon's political motivations ===
Motivations to reform welfare and introduce the FAP were not only grounded in moral terms of eradicating poverty in the United States. As documents were opened in the Richard M. Nixon Presidential Library (RNPL), it has become clear that much of the reasoning behind Nixon's proposal of the FAP may have come from an attempt to appease the worries of a predominately white lower and middle working class. Nixon highlighted this as his 'Northern Strategy' – efforts to garner votes and support from blue-collar workers in industrialized states where the working class was predominantly white. Nixon viewed this group of people as his 'silent majority' – a ticket to winning popularity from a larger majority of Americans. Nixon therefore objectively took a moderate/centrist stance in his implementation of the FAP, noting that conservatives would likely find issues in welfare reform, especially if it blurred racial lines. In this context, the FAP was largely chosen as it redistributed welfare benefits to the working-class poor, who were largely Caucasian in ethnicity. Indeed, one estimate indicated that there would be a shift in the ethnicity of beneficiaries from 51.7% non-white in the 1969 AFDC program to 38.6% non-white in the FAP program by 1972. By creating an entirely new system of welfare reform, Nixon was also separating himself from liberal policymakers like former president Johnson, gaining him an edge politically. The FAP also addressed both leftist qualms with the AFDC over inadequate welfare assistance and welfare inequality while also addressing criticisms of the AFDC from the right over welfare dependency and disincentives to work. By proposing the FAP, Nixon hoped he could not only garner praise from liberals seeking more egalitarian welfare reform but also appeal to a new kind of veiled, latent racial conservatism.

== Identification of the issues ==
The perceived problems with the existing social welfare apparatus were six-fold: that access to aid in the form of AFDC and food stamps and other commodity programs was severely limited; that peripheral programs like Head Start and Job Corps tended to be ineffective; that provisions of the administration of AFDC encouraged dependency and the breakup of families; that little aid was available for the working poor; and that the high and rising costs of the programs in general were insupportable. AFDC covered only 17% of the poor and 35% of all poor children. Commodity programs and food stamps were not widely available; the latter were unavailable in most jurisdictions. Altogether, poverty programs only covered one third of the poor in any fashion. Because AFDC benefits were primarily available to single women with dependent children, there was concern that the program was encouraging dissolution of families—there was some evidence to support this. The major educational and job training programs had failed to demonstrate any significant efficacy. And, overall, the existing system offered little for the working poor.

At the same time, the cost for these programs was rising, and, increasingly, this was ascribed to the fundamental strategy informing most of them: any direct financial aid was scanty, restricted in scope, allotted in a way that disincentivized work and, by and large, emphasis was on provision of services rather than direct income. The expense of the AFDC and, especially, the service programs seemed heavily attributable to administration rather than benefits to the poor. This perception was to be an important factor in the shaping the FAP. As the initial proposal for the FAP developed, both the AFDC and food stamps were retained as part of the package, but the stated ultimate aim was to phase out the service component of the program.

== Specific provisions of the Family Assistance Plan ==
=== Initial proposal ===
The initial proposal of guaranteed income by the Nixon administration would include all poor families – "working poor," "dependent," and poor families headed by a male. The benefit level would not be reduced for families currently enrolled in the AFDC, for states were required to compensate for the difference between the proposed minimum payment and the state's current benefit level. States would be receiving federal assistance, so none would be required to supplement the incomes of the working poor. The essential details of Nixon's initial plan included the following:

1. Only families with unmarried children under 18 years of age or 21 if still in school, would be eligible for the benefit under the FAP.
2. A family of 4 with no other income would be eligible for a maximum of $1600 in June 1972 dollars ($10,163 in March 2021 dollars).
  - The same family of 4 would see no change in the amount of benefit up to the income of $720 ($4,573 in 2021 dollars); and
  - Any other income beyond $720 would be taxed at the rate of 50% until the break-even point or until a point where the benefit would fall to zero, $3920 ($24,900 in 2021 dollars), except:
    - For the earnings from Veteran's pension and certain farm payments as these are taxed at 100%;
    - For children's earnings, welfare payments, and other applicable payments as these are not taxable; and
    - For some child care expenses which would also be excluded from income calculation.
3. Families in possession of resources amounting to over $1500 ($9,528 in 2021 dollars) and a home, personal household goods, and other resources or properties considered essential to the family's self-support would be ineligible for the FAP benefits unless they dispose of excess possessions at a specified rate.
4. For the purposes of the FAP eligibility, a family is defined to only include family members who are related by blood, marriage, or adoption except in the case of a stepfather who shall be considered to be a member of the family. The following category of people have been excluded from a family unit:
  - Members not living in the same household, in-laws, grandparents, and 20-year-old adults not in school whose income information may be unavailable to the other family members;
  - Members of the Armed forces and their spouses and children;
  - Recipients of aid to the aged, aid to the blind, and aid to the permanently and totally disabled, and their dependents;
  - Although the income period is set to be one year, for the purposes of calculating the FAP benefits, the family's current quarterly income is taken into account.
  - Any over or underpayments are to be fixed upon detection.
5. Refusal of taking on "suitable" work or training – that is, registering with the state employment service – by able-bodied family members including single women may result in the reduction of the FAP benefits.
  - The women heads of families who are not in the full-time workforce and whose youngest child is over 6 years old.
  - Mothers whose youngest child is under 6 years old are exempt from meeting the work requirement.

=== 1972 revisions ===
The Family Assistance Plan was revised in 1972 in an attempt to make it more palatable on the Senate floor. The specific provisions that were changed consist of the following:

1. The new plan replaced food stamps with an increase in cash benefits from $1600 to $2400 ($15,245 in 2021) for a family of 4;
2. The tax rate for income earned changed from 50% to 67%;
3. The requirement for "work" was tightened in a way that required beneficiaries to sign up for full-time work training to increase their chances of employment and their skills;
4. The exemption of work requirement that applied to mothers whose dependent child was under 6 years old changed. Under the newly revised plan, the exemption only applied to mothers if their dependent child is under 3 years old;
5. The breakeven point for tax-exempt income changed from $3920 to $4320 ($27,440 in 2021).

Under the new plan, the states received even more fiscal relief from the federal government. They were no longer required to supplement the payments above the established benefit level. The new plan would eliminate the welfare expenditures of twenty-one states and reduce spending for other states significantly. The proposed plan was meant to meet the wishes of both liberals and conservatives but had many features that they could oppose. The cost of the welfare program increased by $6 billion from the costs of the initial plan. The costs of the program concerned many in Congress, but it was not the only obstacle that Nixon had to worry about.

== Supplementary details about the initial proposal ==
Since the initial proposal assumed the continuance and expansion of the food stamp program, the actual minimum income for a family of four would be $2,460 ($20,664 in 2023 dollars). For a family of seven, it would be $4,000 ($33,600 in 2023 dollars). The plan would also continue and increase Old-Age Assistance, Aid to the Blind, and Aid to the Permanently and Totally Disabled.

A penalty for mothers who did not apply for work or training was already a part of AFDC due to provisions of the 1967 welfare amendments under Lyndon Johnson. Under those provisions, a family would forfeit all of the mother's portion of AFDC benefits. No exceptions were granted for need or for mothers of small children. The FAP sought to eliminate this "undifferentiated work requirement" by reducing the penalty and granting an exemption for mothers with children under the age of six (60% of families headed by potentially employable females fell into this category). It was not expected that much use would be made of this clause—experience with the 1967 amendments indicated that there would always be more volunteers for work or training than available slots.

The plan included a massive proposal for day care projected to cost $1,600 per year per child ($13,440 in 2023 dollars).

Overall, the plan was anticipated to eliminate 60% of poverty. This would be particularly true for families of the working poor. Thirteen million persons would be newly covered, and 1.5 million already covered by AFDC would have their benefits raised. And, whereas AFDC only covered 35% of poor children, FAP would cover 100%.

== Legislative history ==
=== 1969–1970 – Introduction and Revision of the FAP ===
Seal of the Department of Health, Education, and Welfare

The first formal proposal of the FAP was introduced to the American public in August 1969 when President Nixon set forth his new goals of welfare reform during a televised address. Nixon's FAP was highlighted as a form of 'workfare' in hopes of incentivizing poorer families to continue working rather than seek unemployment welfare benefits. The initial FAP proposal was positively received, as many believed the previous welfare system in place (the ADFC) to be flawed. However, some critics were mixed in their reception. While some believed the requirements to work were either too harsh or not strict enough, others demanded expanded benefits for those in need.

In October 1969, an administration bill was proposed to amend the Social Security Act of 1935 to the House of Representatives. Included in the bill was a preliminary version of the FAP which was introduced by President Nixon earlier in August. The bill was referred to the Ways and Means Committee for approval.

In April 1970, after revisions were completed on its initial proposal, the October 1969 administration bill, still including the FAP, was passed by the House of Representatives under closed rule. The Senate Finance Committee subsequently received the bill for voting and deemed the bill as insufficient due to potential bias towards families already in similar circumstances under the ADFC and continued possible welfare dependency. The committee requested further revisions of the FAP proposal by the United States Department of Health, Education, and Welfare. These revisions were completed in June 1970 and resubmitted to the Senate Finance Committee for consideration.

In December 1970 a Ninety-first Congress meeting was held. The Senate Finance Committee proposed a version of the October 1969 bill that did not include Nixon's FAP. However, the bill did call for the federal government to conduct up to five trial projects (in today's parlance, pilot programs) meant to test the suitability of incorporating the FAP as a welfare program. The bill itself included many other controversial topics, and as such the topic of FAP testing was not given full consideration until the later moments of the 91st Congress. The confusion over multiple other proposals within the bill outlined by the Senate Finance Committee delayed proper discussion around the proposed tests. Ultimately, the meeting of the 91st Congress did not approve the FAP or its testing.

=== 1971 – The FAP's inclusion in H.R. 1 ===
Number of seats held by Democrats or Republicans in the House of Representatives during the 91st Congress

By January 1971, the FAP had been further revised and made even more complex in the hopes of garnering approval from the Senate Finance Committee. The FAP was included in Bill H.R. 1, another administration bill with the aim of amending the Social Security Act. Bill H.R 1 was put to the House of Representatives for voting. Almost 6 months later, in June, Bill H.R. 1 is passed, this time with the FAP included.

In December 1971, Senator Herman Talmadge proposed an amendment to the current welfare system in place, the AFDC, to include a plan that incentivized work and required anyone over the age of 16 on the system to either begin work-related education or training or become employed. As a result, considerations of alternate methods of welfare reform to the FAP began to be debated.

=== 1972 – Removal of the FAP from H.R. 1 ===
In June 1972, the inclusion of the FAP in H.R. 1 was at the center of many debates and negotiations. A compromise for the FAP was proposed by Senator Abraham Ribicoff, which would merge the FAP and his own plans of guaranteed income. A letter was sent to President Nixon in 1971 which denounced the FAP's plan of 'workfare' as well as any version of H.R. 1 which included the FAP as an unacceptable approach to welfare reform. In the same month, President Nixon approved a twenty percent increase in old-age and survivor's insurance benefits. Supporters of the FAP feared this may have decreased the likeliness that there would be a vote in favor of keeping the FAP as part of the amended H.R. 1 Bill, as it may have served to dissuade potential support amongst more conservative politicians who did not wish to see large changes to the government's role in public services.

By September, the Senate Finance Committee had released a newly revised H.R. 1 at over 900 pages in length. The FAP was voted to not be included in this amended version of the bill. The committee instead chose to have it replaced with a 'workfare' plan put forth by Senator Russell B. Long. This plan was heavily supported by all Republican members of the committee. By October, voting on H.R. 1 had begun. On October 3, the guaranteed income plan proposed by Senator Ribicoff was tabled 52–24. On October 4, the Senate also decides to drop the 'workfare' proposal by Senator Long. Tests of the Nixon FAP, Ribicoff's guaranteed income plan, and Long's 'workfare' were instead included in the bill.

The next day, on October 5, H.R. 1 passed with a vote of 68–5. However, by the time President Nixon signed the bill on October 30, the proposal for these tests had also been removed from planning, despite the Senate having authorized funds for testing earlier in the month. When H.R. 1 was put in action, no marked changes to welfare in America developed and ADFC remained largely intact. After over three years of development, negotiations, and revisions, the FAP was entirely removed from consideration.

== Failure ==
Nixon's FAP came at a time when Congress sought to assert its power in domestic affairs, be it scrutinizing existing programs or declining to enact new ones, which the architects of the Family Assistance Plan hardly realized. The chances of passing such a program through Congress seemed "too slim", per Senator Daniel Patrick Moynihan. Firstly, a guaranteed income was deemed as "immoral" and "impolitic" due largely to tax increases and the disincentive to work. Many people in Congress did not believe that the plan would attract support from middle-class and working-class people, with some calling it a "political suicide." Some "safe-seat" liberals, however, favored guaranteed income as an alternative to the existing system. The moderates were mostly opposed to it because they believed either that it was morally wrong, or the political consequences of such a plan were far-reaching. Many in Congress preferred creating job opportunities and encouraging food stamps. The Family Assistance Plan was set to go through numerous tests in many different committees. In particular, since it was technically a tax bill, it would be scrutinized by the tax committees. Therefore, if it was successful, it would have become a statute financed by the Treasury automatically, representing significant commitment.

The conservative lawmakers regarded the new welfare program as a huge drain on the treasury of the nation, while the liberals concerned themselves with the work requirement of the FAP and its insufficient benefit level.

Interest groups played an important role in the ultimate fate of the FAP. For example, the National Welfare Rights Organization (NWRO) opposed the plan, calling for an alternative plan in which the government would increase the benefit level to $5500 with no work requirement attached to it. Many liberal organizations seemed to have ignored the fact that even the current proposal's price tag was very high, at $4.4 billion (nearly $28 billion in 2021).

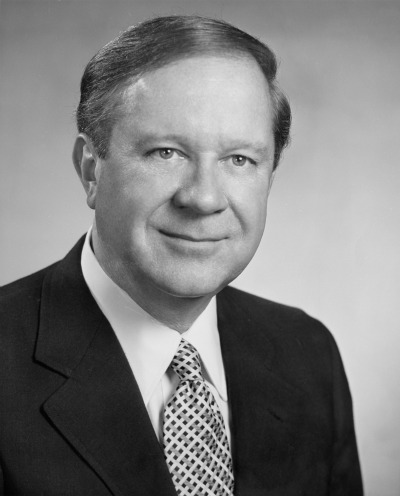
Russell B. Long, Chairman of the Senate Finance Committee during the voting process on Nixon's FAP

When the bill reached the Senate Finance Committee, it faced its hardest test which ultimately led to its demise. From the political perspective, the bill was killed by both the liberals who thought it was too "stingy" and the conservatives who thought it would discourage people from working. Another point of concern for the Senate Finance Committee was the bill's inability to eliminate disparate effects among the recipients, in particular against the working male. The argument was that some non-working families would be receiving more benefits under the FAP than the working male because the latter would be ineligible to receive state supplements. Furthermore, senators brought up the continued issue of inequities. Although the FAP benefit rate would be the same across the nation, individual states still preserved their supplements which meant that the benefit level varied in different parts of the country.

The Senate Finance Committee instructed the administration to work out a revised plan that would address the issues brought up by the committee. The revised plan did not substantially change the provisions of the FAP, but it proposed other benefit programs to be redesigned to fit the FAP. There was to be a gradual reduction in other welfare benefits such as housing, food stamps, and medical benefits as the income increased, just like the FAP benefits. Furthermore, the taxes that applied to the earnings of the FAP recipients increased significantly which reduced the incentive for many to find employment.

The welfare reforms conservatives advocated for needed to "force" people back to employment, uncover welfare fraudsters, and identify male deserters. The FAP added 13 million to the welfare system; therefore, the FAP hardly seemed to be welfare reform. There was also some regional opposition to the bill. Particularly, southerners quickly realized that the significant amount of federal relief to state finances would go toward bigger states like California and New York, based on federal assumptions of these states' welfare expenses. However, the majority of the FAP benefits would go toward poor people in Southern states. With a lack of support from both liberals and conservatives, the Family Assistance Plan had no prospect of passing the Senate despite much-needed welfare reforms.

In his memoirs, Nixon reflected on the opposition he faced to his FAP proposal from both liberals and fellow conservatives, noting that

In many respects I was in a very peculiar situation: less than eight months after my inauguration as the first Republican President in eight years, I was proposing a piece of almost revolutionary domestic legislation that required me to seek a legislative alliance with Democrats and liberals; my own conservative friends and allies were bound to oppose it. I thought the biggest danger would be the attack from the right. I was in for a surprise. Predictably, conservatives denounced the plan as a ““megadole” and a leftist scheme. But then, after a brief round of praise from columnists, editorialists, and academics, the liberals turned on the plan and practically pummeled it to death. They complained that the dollar amounts were not enough and the work requirements were repressive. In fact, FAP would have immediately lifted 60 percent of the people then living in poverty to incomes above that level. This was a real war on poverty, but the liberals could not accept it. Liberal senators immediately began to introduce extravagant bills of their own that had no hope of passage. As Moynihan observed, it was as if they could not tolerate the notion that a conservative Republican President had done what his liberal Democratic predecessors had not been bold enough to do.

== Perspectives, arguments, and public opinion ==
=== Legislative expectation ===
The Family Assistance Program was predicted by leading political commentators to receive positive reactions from various groups including the American public, specific groups related to workers, and political parties, for the following reasons:

- The Family Assistance Program was designed to provide welfare benefits for people by the government for American prosperity.
- The FAP was intended to increase marriage rates with an increased family income from one working husband.
- The FAP was intended to as an implementation of "workfare" to inspire Americans to work. The Nixon administration also had thought that public perception of FAP would have bipartisan support, as Democrats would support a welfare expansion while Republicans would consider it as basic income simplifying the welfare system, an idea associated with the right-leaning economist Milton Friedman. Among local state officials, the FAP was viewed positively as a method of cutting local spending on welfare as the federal government would pay for the program. The United States Chamber of Commerce had opposed the FAP based not on welfare expansion but because of their fear that the working poor would be too dependent on welfare, decreasing working productivity.

=== Media/public polling ===
The FAP was well received by the public according to public polls. In 1970 some public opinion polls by Gallup showed support as high as 65%, particularly when the survey question had emphasized work incentives in the FAP. The Nixon administration also received 2700 letters and telegrams, which they identified as mostly from middle-class Americans, in which over 80% of them expressed enthusiastic support for the FAP. Another 10% of them had certain reservations and notes on improvements but also supported the proposal.

Media across the United States also reacted positively to the FAP. The White House estimated the initial four hundred editorial press coverage and concluded that over 90% of them had a positive assessment of Nixon's plan. Most argued in favor of the FAP citing a need to reform the existing welfare system which they declared that it was a failure. Among the editorials that were uncertain of the FAP, they argued that Nixon would not be able to achieve an effective rollout for this plan throughout the United States. Additionally, they also feared that this would increase government expenditures, expanding the national debt.

=== Race/region ===
The FAP was expected to be well received in the South, where African Americans, who did not receive as many welfare benefits in proportion to white Americans, would welcome the program. Among the 52% of the U.S. population obtaining the FAP, two-thirds of them would have been impoverished African Americans. Additionally, one of the biggest factors in deciding the amount of benefits from the FAP a family could receive was based on the family size. As African Americans in rural regions had on average a larger family size compared to white families living in urbanized regions, the FAP disproportionately benefited Black families. Among African Americans, people living in the South supported the FAP as it would vastly increase their minimal income, while northern Americans feared the FAP could cut existing welfare. Nevertheless, the FAP raised concerns for white Americans as they resented that Black people, especially in the rural South, could receive more benefits that could increase their living standards. For white people, this meant that the FAP could increase civil rights for Black people, such as education and speeches. It also aroused the fear of increased civic participation by Black people. In 1968, the U.S. Commission on Civil Rights predicted that political participation by Black people especially in the South would increase once Black people were able to become more economically self-sufficient. Thus the Southern Democratic establishment, the conservative Democrats, opposed the FAP as they thought giving a universal basic income could equalize the power among African Americans and white Americans in the South. As the conservative Democrats controlled the Senate Finance Committee, the FAP would ultimately be rejected in 1971.

Meanwhile, the southern states were also expected to receive the most benefits out of the FAP. The South on average received less welfare benefits from the government compared to the North. The Department of Health, Education and Welfare (HEW) yielded different proportions of welfare benefits to each different region. Approximately 38% of the funds went to five northeastern regions, another 13% were used for California, and the other 32% were paid for fourteen regions located in northern areas while the southern states could not receive funds from other welfare policies. According to the estimation by HEW, 52% of the U.S. population who most benefited from the FAP would be from the South. President Nixon intended to eliminate regional discrimination through the program as well.

=== Labor market ===
The reaction to FAP by business owners was mixed. The main concern business owners had with the FAP was an increase in average income would incentives people to opt for lower-wage jobs. As the FAP would supplement earnings for low-income families, the labour could concentrate on jobs with lower wages as people would be satisfied with working in menial jobs with lower pay. Additionally, small business owners also worried that people with FAP benefits would demand higher wages and better working environments in the future. On the other hand, owners of large businesses welcomed the FAP because they anticipated an increase in labor supply by males, especially in the low-wage sector. On the other hand, organized labor supported the FAP as it could contribute to an increase in the minimum wage and ameliorate social insurance for laborers. From the perspective of organized labor, the program was considered an opportunity to reinforce labor unions by increasing labor supply. Organized labor groups were more inclined to support the FAP because those in skilled labor positions, often white males, did not feel threatened by increasing amounts of unskilled labour.

Ideologically, for moderate business leaders and organizations that did not hold low-income citizens responsible for their poverty, the FAP was popular as they thought it could quell urban violence as a form of their contribution to social justice. In contrast, conservative business owners also favored the FAP as they believed that this was a tough stance against welfare that could detach people from welfare assistance.

=== Gender ===
Women thought the FAP, like previous welfare programs, emphasized the role of males in the family as welfare was determined by labour participation. This meant women, who had irregular jobs with low wages or who stayed at home to focus on household affairs, had to be economically dependent on their male family members. This increased male economic power in proportion to female economic power. This lowered the value of female labour participation as it reinforced male power and dominance over female family members. Thus the government responded to potential inequality between male and female earnings by proposing a daycare system alongside the FAP that could encourage mothers to participate in job training and employment. However, the funding only allocated $858 per year per family ($5,450 in 2021), when the HEW estimated daycare costs to be $2000 per year per family ($12,703 in 2021) and did not suggest clear plans regarding its management. Additionally, daycare system beneficiaries would also experience a cut in their FAP funding.

=== Welfare professionals ===
Daniel Patrick Moynihan, in his 1973 book The Politics of a Guaranteed Income: The Nixon Administration and the Family Assistance Plan, devotes much space to the opposition to FAP by what he characterizes as middle- to upper-middle class welfare professionals. These were individuals who constituted, in the words of a Life Magazine editorial of the time, a "'vast welfare bureaucracy," 170,000 employees with a "built-in resistance to change…'"—and whose salaries were heavily responsible for the costs of that system—as well as others benefitting less directly.

Moynihan portrays them as a self-aware interest group who "did all in their power to insure that a guaranteed income was not enacted." To some extent, this was for ideological reasons; in their view "[t]he poor were to be helped through strategies that would lead to individual improvement and collective self-realization, with a considerable degree of elite direction…," and a plan simply to give money to the poor "was a threat to this strategy, and perceived as such." It was also, however, a response to a proposal that threatened their authority and incomes. Their opposition consisted to a large extent in factual misrepresentation of FAP. At times, however, it involved overt appeal to their own self-interest.

Moynihan also suggests that a desire to placate the newly arisen National Welfare Rights Organization (see above), who were hostile both to FAP and to welfare professionals themselves, influenced the profession's activities.

== Legacy ==
Nixon's FAP was one of the bipartisan policies that reflected the New Deal era that led to the expansion of welfare across the United States. The FAP was dictated by economic policies that dominated American political discourse since Franklin D. Roosevelt in the 1930s, where welfare expansion, especially towards his blue-collar white constituencies was a necessity for electoral success. Nixon favoured this liberal welfare program over conservatives because the FAP would have eliminated the Aid to Families with Dependent Children program making FAP the sole welfare program for the working poor. However, by 1968 expansion of welfare started to become an electoral liability as it increased the public's anxiety over racial, gender, and sociocultural issues that became prominent in the 1960s. Even Nixon's own white constituencies were never able to ultimately support the FAP, despite the fact that they would also gain from the program. Conservative political figures subsequently learned from Nixon's failed FAP welfare reform that expansion of welfare to the working poor would not attract conservative voters. By Ronald Reagan's presidency, anti-welfare rhetoric became popular as he touted his avocation for small government. Thus by the end of the 20th century, the rhetoric against welfare which was partially reflected by Nixon himself in his proposal for the FAP became a normality in American politics.

== See also ==
- Richard Nixon
- War on Poverty (United States)
- Aid to Families with Dependent Children
- Social programs in the United States
- Guaranteed minimum income

== Bibliography ==
- Asen, Robert. 2001. "Nixon's Welfare Reform: Enacting Historical Contradictions of Poverty Discourses." Rhetoric & Public Affairs 4, no. 2: 261–79. https://doi.org/10.1353/rap.2001.0019.
- Bowler, M. Kenneth. 1974. The Nixon Guaranteed Income Proposal: Substance and Process in Policy Change. Cambridge, Mass: Ballinger Pub. Co.
- The Family-Assistance Plan: A Chronology. 1972. Social Service Review 46 (4): 603–608.
- Heyman, Philip. 1985. The Family Assistance Plan: Abridged. Kennedy School of Government. pp. 1–21.
- Kornbluh, Felicia. 2008. "Who Shot FAP? The Nixon Welfare Plan and the Transformation of American Politics." The Sixties 1, no. 2: 125–50. https://doi.org/10.1080/17541320802457038.
- Lampman, Robert James. 1969. Nixon's Family Assistance Plan. Vol. 57–69;57-69.;. Madison: Institute for Research on Poverty, University of Wisconsin.
- McNown, Robert F. 1973. "THE STORY OF THE FAMILY ASSISTANCE PLAN." Current History 65 (384) (Aug 01): 57.
- Moynihan, Daniel P. The Politics of a Guaranteed Income; the Nixon Administration and the Family Assistance Plan. New York, Random House, 1973.
- Quadagno, Jill. "Race, Class, and Gender in the U.S. Welfare State: Nixon's Failed Family Assistance Plan." American Sociological Review 55, no. 1 (February 1990): 11–28. https://doi.org/10.2307/2095700.
- Spitzer, Scott J. "Nixon's New Deal: Welfare Reform for the Silent Majority." Presidential Studies Quarterly 42, no. 3 (July 19, 2012): 455–81. https://doi.org/10.1111/j.1741-5705.2012.03989.x.
- Steensland, Brian. 2018. The Failed Welfare Revolution America's Struggle over Guaranteed Income Policy. Princeton ; Oxford Princeton University Press.
- Wolf, Mark L., and John V. Erickson. 1971. "Work Incentive Aspects of the Family Assistance Plan." Harv. J. on Legis. 9: 179.
