= Reduction of working hours in France =

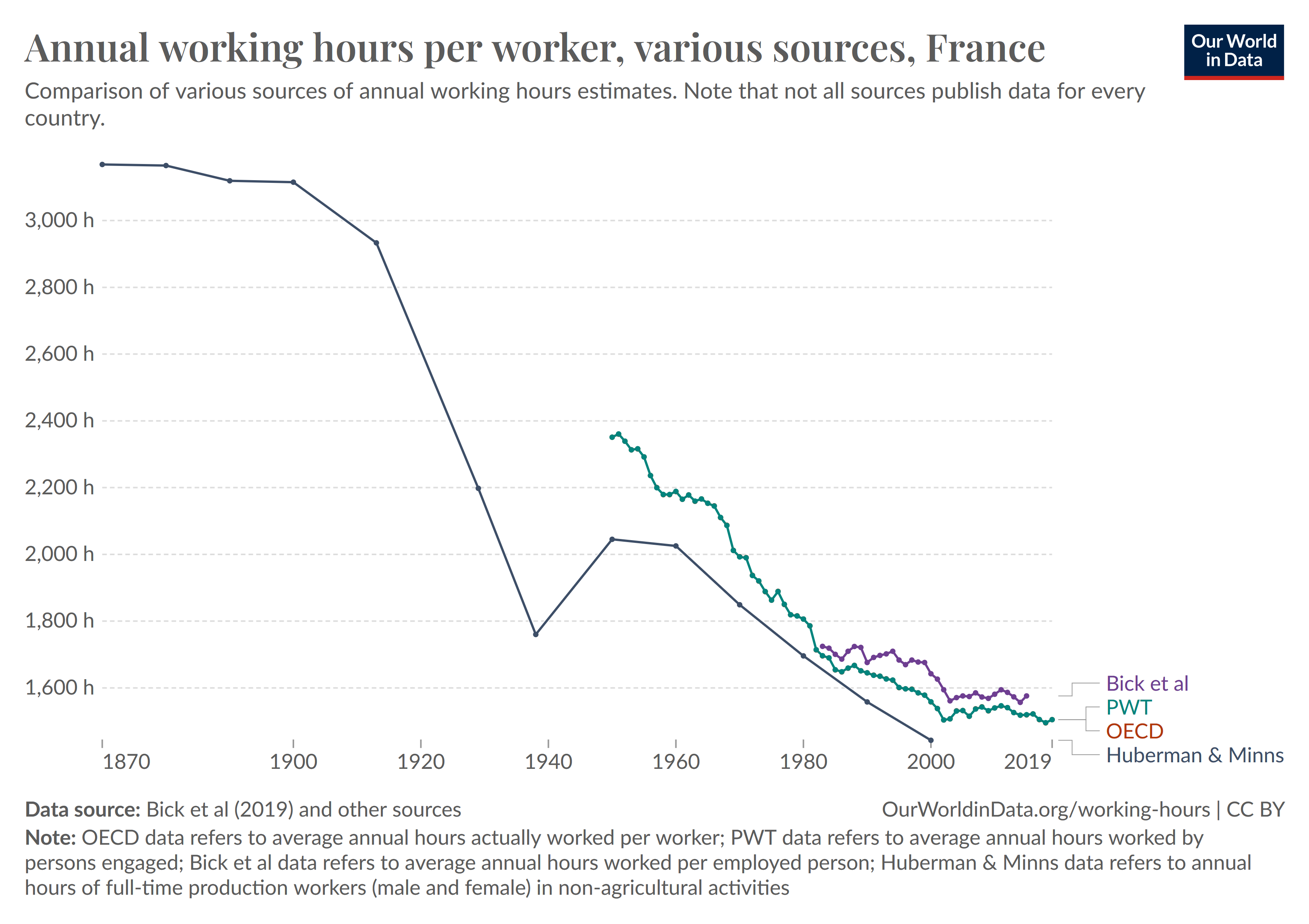
Annual working time per worker in France

The reduction of working hours is a general trend towards a reduction in annual working time in Europe and North America from the middle of the 19th century.

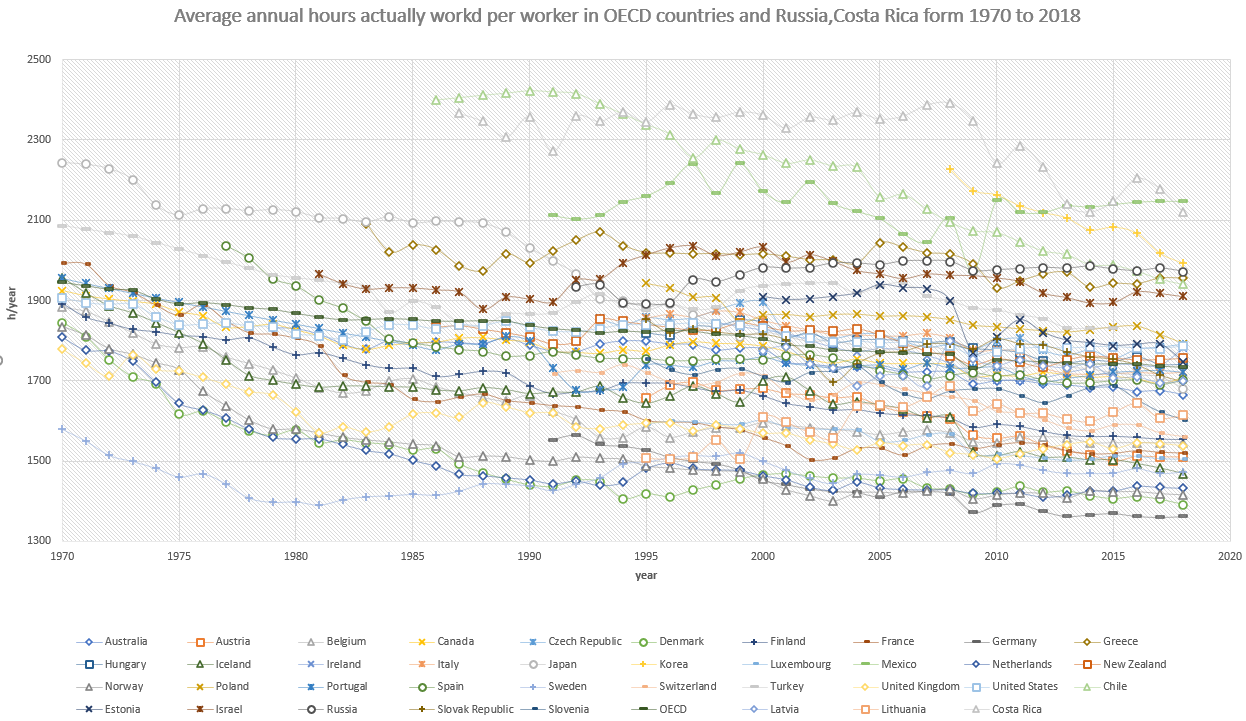
Average number of hours actually worked per employee in OECD countries from 1970 to 2018.

The concept of working time really appeared with modern wage labor and large-scale industry. As factory work replaced crafts or homework, working time became visible and could be regulated by law. Despite the diversity of situations, there was a general trend towards reducing annual working time in Europe and North America from the middle of the 19th century.

== Chronology ==
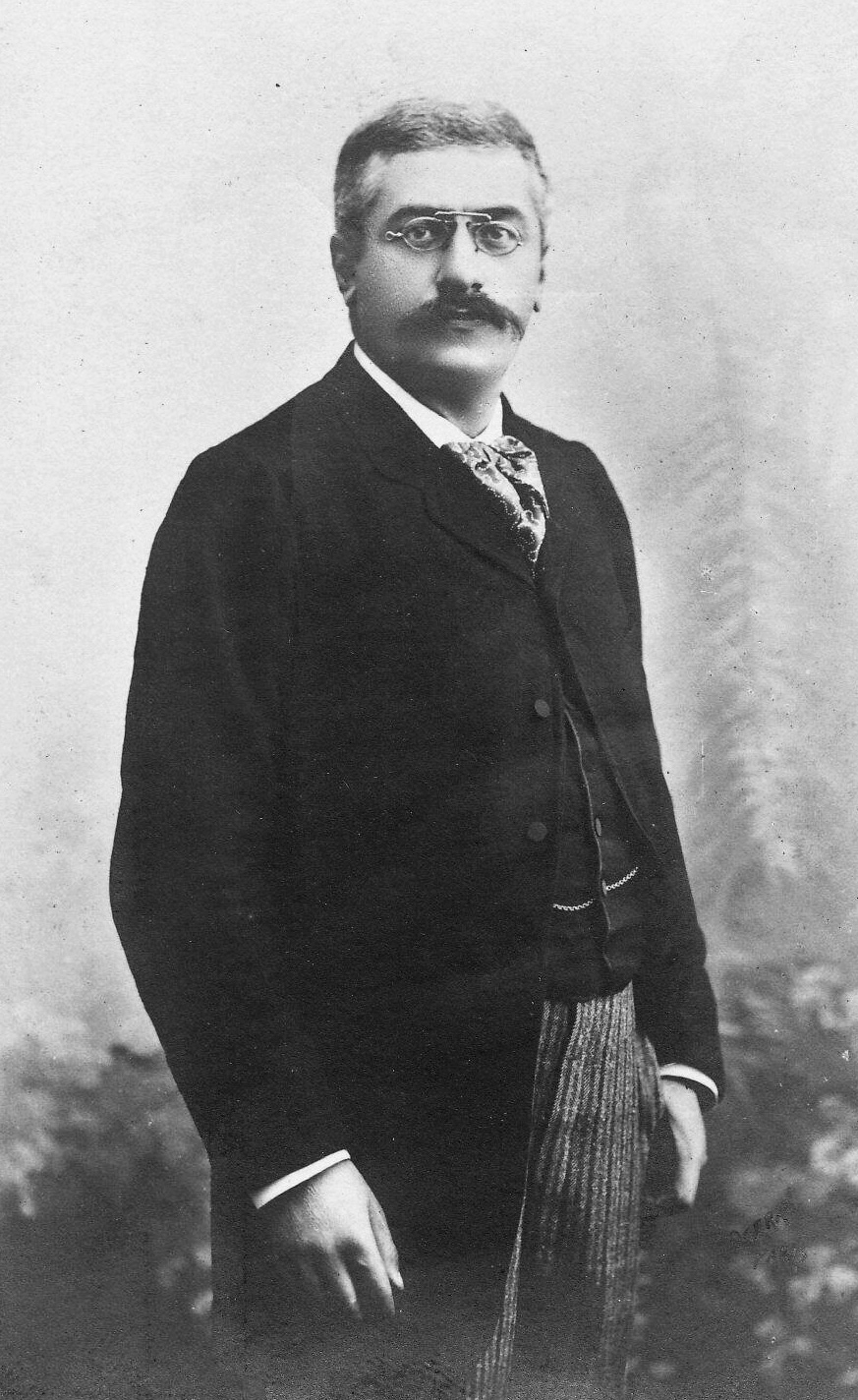
- Alexandre Millerand, at the origin of the law of March 30, 1900.
  In 1841 a Law relating to the labour of children employed in factories, plants and workshops limited the working time of children, from twelve to sixteen years old, to 12 hours per day, and to 8 hours per day from eight to twelve years old.
- Decree of 2 March 1848 limited the working day for adults to ten hours in Paris and eleven in the provinces.
- Decree of 9 September 1848, revoked the previous one, and set the maximum daily duration at twelve hours.
- Law of May 19, 1874 limiting the working time of children under twelve years of age to 6 hours per day in sectors authorized to employ them.
- Law of 1892 limiting the working time of women to 11 hours per day, as well as of children from sixteen to eighteen years of age.
- Law of March 30, 1900 (publicized on September 30), known as the "Millerand law", limiting the working day to eleven hours from April 1, 1900 until April 1, 1902, then to ten and a half hours until April 1, 1904; and setting the progressive application over a period of four years.
- Law of April 23, 1919 establishing the forty-eight-hour week and the eight-hour day.
- 1936 laws establishing the forty-hour week and paid holidays by the Popular Front.
- 1982 order establishing the thirty-nine hour week under Mitterrand.
- Laws of 1992 and 1993 encouraging the reduction of working hours and the development of part-time work.
- Interprofessional agreements of 1995 organizing the distribution of working time over the year.

== See also ==
- Working time
- Lump of labour fallacy
- 35-hour workweek
- Economy of France
- Universal inheritance
- Job guarantee
