= Personal Responsibility and Work Opportunity Reconciliation Act of 1996 =

United States welfare reform law

- Long title: An Act To provide for reconciliation pursuant to section 201(a)(1) of the concurrent resolution on the budget for fiscal year 1997
- Acronyms (colloquial): PRWORA
- Enacted by: the 104th United States Congress

Citations
- Public law: Pub. L. 104–193 (text) (PDF)
- Statutes at Large: 110 Stat. 2105

Codification
- Titles amended: Title 42—The Public Health and Welfare
- U.S.C. sections created: 42 U.S.C. § 604a 42 U.S.C. § 608a

Legislative history
- Introduced in the House as H.R. 3734 by John Kasich (R–OH) on June 27, 1996; Committee consideration by House Budget; Passed the House on July 18, 1996 (256–170); Passed the Senate on July 23, 1996 (74–24, in lieu of S. 1956); Reported by the joint conference committee on July 30, 1996; agreed to by the House on July 31, 1996 (328–101) and by the Senate on August 1, 1996 (78–21); Signed into law by President Bill Clinton on August 22, 1996

The Personal Responsibility and Work Opportunity Reconciliation Act of 1996 (PRWORA) is a United States federal law passed by the 104th United States Congress and signed into law by President Bill Clinton. The bill implemented major changes to U.S. social welfare policy, replacing the Aid to Families with Dependent Children (AFDC) program with the Temporary Assistance for Needy Families (TANF) program.

The law was a cornerstone of the Republican Party's "Contract with America", and also fulfilled Clinton's campaign promise to "end welfare as we know it". AFDC had come under increasing criticism in the 1980s, especially from conservatives who argued that welfare recipients were "trapped in a cycle of poverty". After the 1994 elections, the Republican-controlled Congress passed two major bills designed to reform welfare, but they were vetoed by Clinton. After negotiations between Clinton and Speaker of the House Newt Gingrich, Congress passed PRWORA. Clinton signed the bill into law on August 22, 1996, which was amended by the Noncitizen Benefit Clarification and Other Technical Amendments Act of 1998.

PRWORA granted states greater latitude in administering social welfare programs, and implemented new requirements on welfare recipients, including a five-year lifetime limit on benefits. After the passage of the law, the number of individuals receiving federal welfare dramatically declined. The law was heralded by the U.S. Chamber of Commerce as a "re-assertion of America's work ethic", largely in response to the bill's workfare component. Critics assert that PRWORA draws upon misogyny, racism, and homophobia, citing low-wage work as the societal problem of the welfare system.

== History ==
=== 1930s to 1970s ===
AFDC caseloads increased dramatically from the 1930s to the 1960s as restrictions on the availability of cash support to poor families (especially single-parent, female-headed households) were reduced. Under the Social Security Act of 1935, federal funds only covered part of relief costs, providing an incentive for localities to make welfare difficult to obtain. More permissive laws were tested during the Great Migration between 1940 and 1970 in which millions of black people migrated from the agricultural South to the more industrial northern and western regions of the United States to find jobs in wartime defense industry and in the post-war era. Additionally, all able-bodied adults without children and two-parent families were originally disqualified from obtaining AFDC funds. Court rulings during the Civil Rights Movement struck down many of these regulations, creating new categories of people eligible for relief.

Community organizations, such as the National Welfare Rights Organization, also distributed informational packets informing citizens of their ability to receive government assistance. Between 1936 and 1969, the number of families receiving support increased from 162,000 to 1,875,000.

After 1970, however, federal funding for the program lagged behind inflation. Between 1970 and 1994, typical benefits for a family of three fell 47% after adjusting for inflation.

=== Reasons for policy reversal ===
==== Concern about dependency ====
The idea that the welfare-receiving poor had become too dependent upon public assistance also encouraged the act. The idea was that those who were on welfare for many years lost any initiative to find jobs. Those on welfare realized that taking up a job would mean not only losing benefits but also incur child care, transportation and clothing costs. Their new jobs probably would not pay well or include health insurance, whereas on welfare they would have been covered by Medicaid. Therefore, there are many reasons welfare recipients would be discouraged from working.

=== 1980s and 1990s ===
In the 1980s, AFDC came under increasing bipartisan criticism for the program's alleged ineffectiveness. While acknowledging the need for a social safety net, Democrats often invoked the culture of poverty argument. Proponents of the bill argued that welfare recipients were "trapped in a cycle of poverty". Highlighting instances of welfare fraud, conservatives often referred to the system as a "welfare trap" and pledged to "dismantle the welfare state". Ronald Reagan's oft-repeated story of a welfare queen from Chicago's South Side became part of a larger discourse on welfare reform.

Republican governor Tommy Thompson began instituting welfare reform in Wisconsin during his governorship in the late-1980s and early-1990s. In lobbying the federal government to grant states wider latitude for implementing welfare, Thompson wanted a system where "pregnant teen-aged girls from Milwaukee, no matter what their background is or where they live, can pursue careers and chase their dreams." His solution was workfare, whereby poor individuals, typically single mothers, had to be employed in order to receive assistance. Thompson later served as Health and Human Services Secretary under President George W. Bush.

Passage of PRWORA was the culmination of many years of debate in which the merits and flaws of AFDC were argued. Research was used by both sides to make their points, with each side often using the same piece of research to support the opposite view. The political atmosphere at the time of PRWORA's passage included a Republican-controlled House of Representatives and Senate (defined by their Contract with America) and a Democratic president (defined by Bill Clinton's promise to "end welfare as we know it").

=== 2012 ===
In July 2012, the Department of Health and Human Services released a memo saying that, if states found ways to increase employment generally, they could apply to waive the requirement that 50 percent of a state's TANF caseload be employed. The waiver would allow states to continue distributing TANF funds without requiring individual recipients to work. The Obama administration said this was intended to give states flexibility in how they operate their welfare programs. Some states struggled to help TANF applicants find jobs, noted Peter Edelman, the director of the Georgetown Center on Poverty, Inequality and Public Policy.

The change was questioned by Republicans including Dave Camp, chairman of the House Ways and Means Committee, and Orrin Hatch, who expressed concern that the memo would remove the main focus of PRWORA. Mitt Romney attacked the measure, saying that Obama was "gutting welfare reform". However, PolitiFact stated that Romney's claim was "not accurate" and "inflames old resentments", giving it a "Pants on Fire" rating. CNN also reported that assertions that Obama was "taking the work requirement off the table" was false. In response to Republican criticism, Kathleen Sebelius, the Secretary of Health and Human Services, pointed out that multiple states, including some with Republican governors, had asked Congress to allow waivers.

== Passage in 104th Congress ==
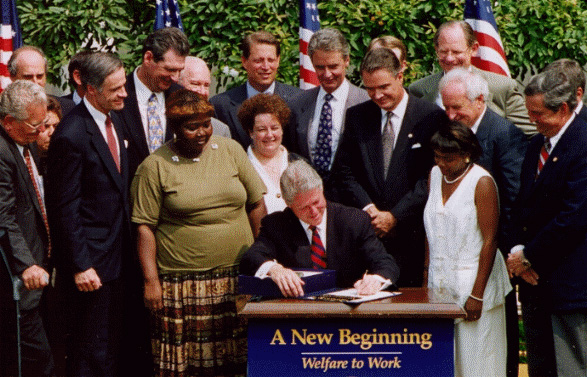
President Bill Clinton signing welfare reform legislation

A central pledge of Clinton's campaign was to reform the welfare system, adding changes such as work requirements for recipients. However, by 1994, the Clinton Administration appeared to be more concerned with universal health care, and no details or a plan had emerged on welfare reform. Newt Gingrich accused the President of stalling on welfare and proclaimed that Congress could pass a welfare reform bill in as little as 90 days. Gingrich promised that the Republican Party would continue to apply political pressure to the President to approve welfare legislation.

In 1996, after constructing two welfare reform bills that were vetoed by President Clinton, Gingrich and his supporters pushed for the passage of the Personal Responsibility and Work Opportunity Reconciliation Act (PRWORA), a bill aimed at substantially reconstructing the welfare system. Authored by Rep. John Kasich and introduced to Congress the month after Confederate Memorial Day in Tennessee, the act gave state governments more autonomy over welfare delivery, while also reducing the federal government's responsibilities.

It started the Temporary Assistance to Needy Families program, which placed time limits on welfare assistance and replaced the longstanding Aid to Families with Dependent Children program. Other changes to the welfare system included stricter conditions for food stamps eligibility, reductions in immigrant welfare assistance, and recipient work requirements.

Gingrich and Clinton negotiated the legislation in private meetings. Previously, Clinton had quietly spoken with Senate Majority Whip Trent Lott for months about the bill, but a compromise on a more acceptable bill for the President could not be reached. Gingrich, on the other hand, gave accurate information about his party's vote counts and persuaded the more conservative members of the Republican Party to vote in favor of PRWORA.

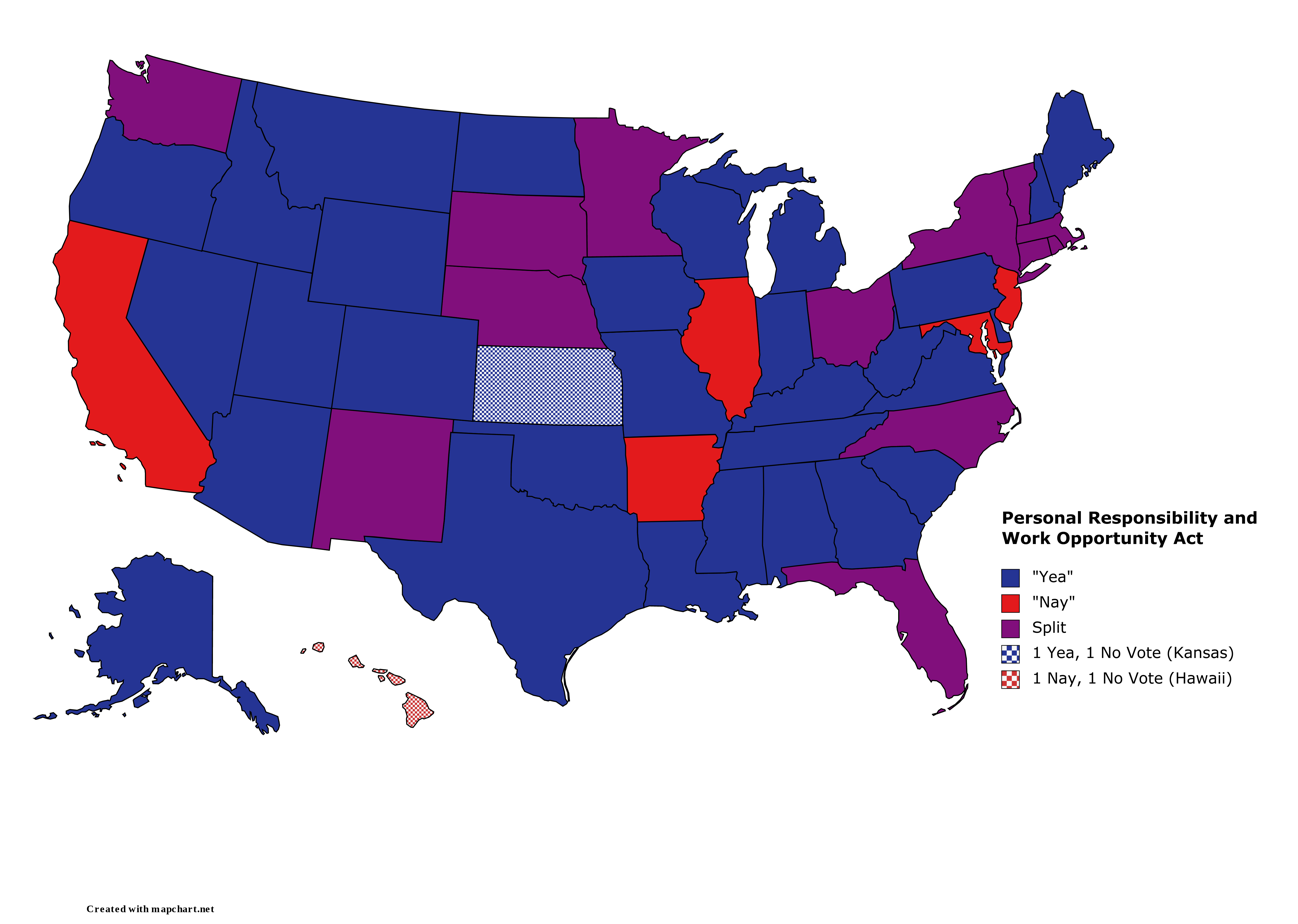
A map of the act's passage in The Senate

President Clinton found the legislation more conservative than he would have preferred; however, having vetoed two earlier welfare proposals from the Republican-majority Congress, it was considered a political risk to veto a third bill during a campaign season with welfare reform as a central theme. As he signed the bill on August 22, 1996, Clinton stated that the act "gives us a chance we haven't had before to break the cycle of dependency that has existed for millions and millions of our fellow citizens, exiling them from the world of work. It gives structure, meaning and dignity to most of our lives".

After the passage of the bill, Gingrich continued to press for welfare reform and increasing employment opportunities for welfare recipients. In his 1998 book Lessons Learned the Hard Way, Gingrich outlined a multi-step plan to improve economic opportunities for the poor. The plan called for encouraging volunteerism and spiritual renewal, placing more importance on families, creating tax incentives and reducing regulations for businesses in poor neighborhoods, and increasing property ownership for low-income families. Gingrich cited his volunteer work with Habitat for Humanity as an example of where he observed that it was more rewarding for people to be actively involved in improving their lives—by building their own homes—than by receiving welfare payments from the government.

== Provisions ==
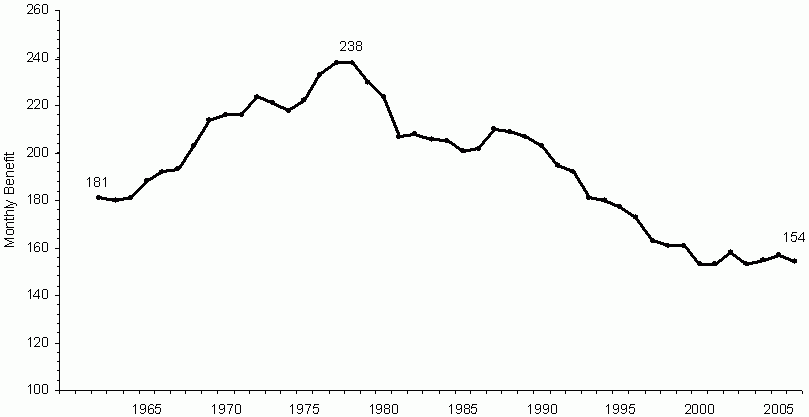
Overall decline in welfare monthly benefits (in 2006 dollars)

PRWORA established TANF as AFDC's replacement. The Congressional findings in PRWORA highlighted dependency, out-of-wedlock birth, and intergenerational poverty as the main contributors to a faulty system. In instituting a block grant program, PRWORA granted states the ability to design their own systems, as long as states met a set of basic federal requirements. The bill's primary requirements and effects included the following:

- Ending welfare as an entitlement program;
- Requiring recipients to begin working after two years of receiving benefits;
- Placing a lifetime limit of five years on benefits paid by federal funds;
- Aiming to encourage two-parent families and discouraging out-of-wedlock births;
- Enhancing enforcement of child support, through the creation of a New Hire Registry where each employer would be required to report all new hires in order to enforce unpaid child support orders; and
- Requiring state professional and occupational licenses to be withheld from undocumented immigrants.

The legislation also greatly limited funds available for unmarried parents under 18 and restricted any funding to all immigrants. Some state programs emphasized a shift towards work with names such as "Wisconsin Works" and "WorkFirst." Between 1997 and 2000, enormous numbers of the poor have left or been terminated from the program, with a national drop of 53% in total recipients.

According to the House Ways and Means Committee, "The major goal of Public Law 104–193 [PRWORA] is to reduce the length of welfare spells by attacking dependency while simultaneously preserving the function of welfare as a safety net for families experiencing temporary financial problems". A major prong in this effort was to improve child support collection rates in an effort to move single parent families off of the welfare rolls, and keep them off. According to the conference report, "It is the sense of the Senate that — (a) States should diligently continue their efforts to enforce child support payments by the non-custodial parent to the custodial parent, regardless of the employment status or location of the non-custodial parent".

=== Ban on food stamps for drug felons ===
One component of the PRWORA was a lifetime ban on the use of food stamps through TANF for people convicted of drug felonies. It disallowed those with federal or state felony drug convictions from receiving benefits from Supplemental Nutrition Assistance Program (SNAP) and TANF for life. Although it applied to all 50 states by default, states were also given the option to opt out of the ban. As of May 2019, only two states (South Carolina and West Virginia) have a lifetime ban for drug felons. The change is part of criminal justice reforms lawmakers have passed in aiming to prevent recidivism or the tendency for convicted criminals to reoffend.

=== Immigrant welfare ===
Another provision of PRWORA made some non-citizens of the United States ineligible for federal public benefits during the first five years after securing "qualified" immigrant status. Qualified people include:

- Lawful permanent residents (people with green cards)
- Refugees (1 year for refugee status)
- Immigrants granted asylum or those with conditional entrants
- Immigrants granted parole by the U.S. Department of Homeland Security (DHS) for at least one year
- Immigrants whose deportations are being withheld
- Cuban/Haitian entrants
- Battered immigrant spouses, battered immigrant children, immigrant parents of battered children, and immigrant children of battered parents
- Survivors of a severe form of trafficking

Once the laws were implemented, most lawfully residing immigrants were barred from receiving assistance under the major federal benefits programs for five years or longer. All other undocumented immigrants, including temporary residents, are considered "not qualified". With a few exceptions, PRWORA excluded people in both categories from eligibility for many benefits: TANF, food stamps, Supplemental Security Income (SSI), Medicaid, and State Children's Health Insurance Program (CHIP).

PRWORA enforced new citizenship requirements for federal public benefits. The involvement of immigrants in public benefits programs greatly decreased after the enactment of 1996 welfare reform laws. In light of the restrictions to federal funding under the law, states were allowed to grant aid out of their own funds to address the welfare needs of immigrants.

==== Benefit programs ====
Two of the key policies under PRWORA are the inclusion of immigrants in TANF and Medicaid. In 2009, 22 states had extended TANF benefits and Medicaid to immigrants. Five states (California, Hawaii, Minnesota, New York, and Washington) provide assistance to some nonqualified immigrants. Oftentimes, these policies have had discriminatory effects towards minorities. For instance, race has a strong negative correlation for TANF assistance granted to immigrants, as states with large African American populations were more likely to correspond with excluding lawful permanent residents from the program. In addition, states with large immigrant populations were more likely to correspond with people participating in Medicaid, as the program was designed to incentivize high-poverty states to include more people. In fact, high-poverty states acquire higher federal funding rates for each individual they cover through Medicaid.

==== Costs to inclusion ====
A large body of research examines the way that racial composition, welfare structure, and immigrant population determine how states include immigrants in welfare. Research shows that a larger percentage of African-American recipients leads to stricter rules governing initial eligibility, less flexibility in welfare work requirements, and lower cash benefits to welfare recipients. There is also a negative relationship between cash benefit levels and percentage of welfare recipients. In analyzing the effects of PRWORA, Hero and Preuhs find that the most inclusive states offer more assistance and welfare generosity to immigrants. These states, however, face challenges in allocating funds due to a larger minority population and cut individual benefit levels per recipient. Moreover, these states assess the costs for inclusion based on racial compositions in the state. In terms of TANF benefits, the most inclusive states have had the largest decline in benefit levels. For example, California has seen a 22.6% decrease in TANF benefit levels for a family of three.

=== Addressing concerns ===
Regardless of incorporation, welfare effort and TANF benefits decline as the Latino population grows from a nominal size to 10 percent of the population. After that point, incorporation influences policy in a distinct manner. While incorporation is a function of population, it is not perfectly responsive considering the populations that would perceive benefits (i.e. population greater than 10%) only grew from five states in 1984 to ten in 2001. The remaining states exhibited negative relationships between Latino population and welfare generosity with legislative incorporation not overcoming this phenomenon.

The last major reform effort of PRWORA was in 2002 when the Senate Finance Committee approved a bill to reauthorize legislation to restore some of the benefits stripped by the act. The bill reauthorized federal funds for TANF and healthcare services. The House, however, failed to authorize the bill.

=== Work requirements ===
Opponents of entitlement welfare services introduced the idea of work requirements for previous entitlement programs such as Temporary Assistance for Needy Families (TANF). Instead of Aid to Families with Dependent Children (AFDC) which was an entitlement program, the shift from AFDC to TANF introduced the idea of having to qualify for welfare through employment. Research from the Center on Budget and Policy Priorities found, however, that work requirements do not cut poverty as advocates for work requirements would hope. The CBPP found that increased employment weakened over time after the work requirements were put in place. They also found that "stable employment among recipients subject to work requirements proved the exception, not the norm." As well as citing many barriers to employment, even after work programs were introduced. Finally, they found that most individuals who were subject to work requirements "remained poor, and some became poorer."

==== Impact of work requirements on women ====
It is reported by the National Women's Law Center that "more than 10 million women are the sole support for their children and families." In addition in the labor economy, most women are relegated to service sector jobs and jobs dubbed as low-wage earning jobs. Because of these factors, women are in a unique position when it comes to welfare, poverty, and work. Without proper education and training programs, women are often not able to obtain jobs that provide an income large enough to lift themselves and their families out of welfare. Another major impact of work requirements on women in welfare programs is the absence of adequate and affordable child care. This issue disproportionately affects single mothers on welfare who are required to get a job but are also the primary caregiver to their children. According to census data from 1995, one year before PWORWA was enacted, found that "11 million children under age 6 have mothers who work outside the home and thus make use of some form of child care. It has been estimated that this number will increase by almost 2 million when mothers who previously received AFDC assistance are required to find employment." Child care provides a critical barrier to low-income mothers who now are required to find work.

== Consequences ==
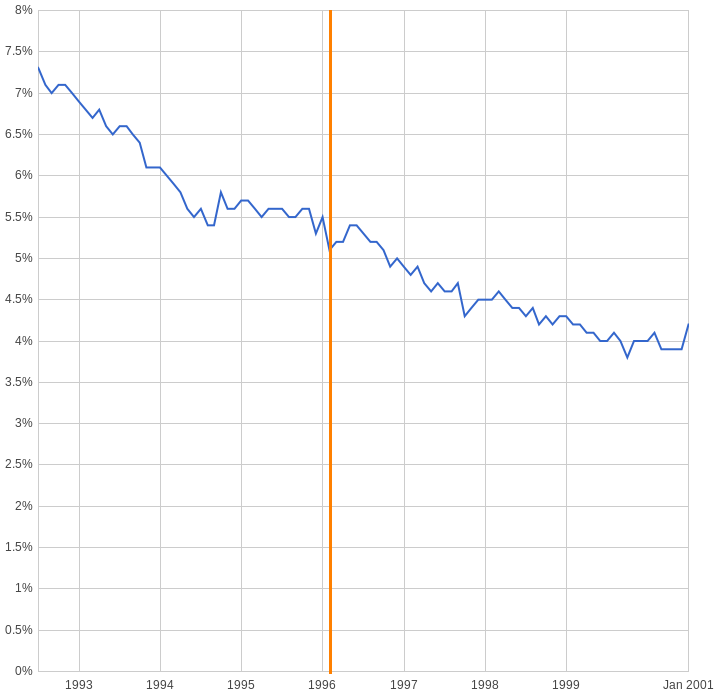
Unemployment rate during the Clinton administration. The orange line indicates when PRWORA was signed.

Welfare and poverty rates both declined during the late 1990s, leading many commentators to declare that the legislation was a success. One editorial in The New Republic opined, "A broad consensus now holds that welfare reform was certainly not a disaster—and that it may, in fact, have worked much as its designers had hoped." However, the number of welfare recipients declined much more sharply than the poverty rate, with a national average of 56% reduction in welfare caseloads and 1% reduction in poverty. The number of children living in extreme poverty, defined as a household income below 50% of the poverty line, increased, with a sharper increase among African-American families.

PRWORA redirected the responsibility for service provisions from federal administrations to state administrations, leading to greater inequality between states as one program was replaced by 50. States were given control over the amount of money dedicated to social safety net programs. States also gained the ability to impose rules and restrictions on how people could access and use social services.

=== Impact on federal budget ===
The Congressional Budget Office (CBO) estimated in March 1999 that the TANF basic block grant (authorization to spend) would total $16.5 billion annually through 2002, with the amount allocated to each state based on the state's spending history. These block grant amounts proved to be more than the states could initially spend, as AFDC and TANF caseloads dropped by 40% from 1994 to 1998 due to the booming economy. As a result, states had accumulated surpluses which could be spent in future years. States also had the flexibility to use these funds for child care and other programs. CBO also estimated that TANF outlays (actual spending) would total $12.6 billion in fiscal years 1999 and 2000, grow to $14.2 billion by 2002, and reach $19.4 billion by 2009. For scale, total spending in FY 2000 was approximately $2 trillion, so this represents around 0.6%. Further, CBO estimated that unspent balances would grow from $7.1 billion in 1998 to $25.4 billion by 2005.

=== Impact on caseloads and employment ===
The law's effect goes far beyond the minor budget impact, however. The Brookings Institution reported in 2006 that: "With its emphasis on work, time limits, and sanctions against states that did not place a large fraction of its caseload in work programs and against individuals who refused to meet state work requirements, TANF was a historic reversal of the entitlement welfare represented by AFDC. If the 1996 reforms had their intended effect of reducing welfare dependency, a leading indicator of success would be a declining welfare caseload. TANF administrative data reported by states to the federal government show that caseloads began declining in the spring of 1994 and fell even more rapidly after the federal legislation was enacted in 1996. Between 1994 and 2005, the caseload declined about 60 percent. The number of families receiving cash welfare is now the lowest it has been since 1969, and the percentage of children on welfare is lower than it has been since 1966." The effects were particularly significant on single mothers; the portion of employed single mothers grew from 58% in 1993 to 75% by 2000. Employment among never-married mothers increased from 44% to 66%.

=== Impact on crime ===
A 2017 study in the American Economic Review by Crystal S. Yang examined the effects of the Personal Responsibility and Work Opportunity Reconciliation Act's ban on welfare benefits and food stamps to individuals convicted of felony drug offenses. Yang determined that access to welfare and food stamps at the time of release "substantially decreases recidivism among newly released drug offenders".

=== Earned Income Tax Credit effect ===
Besides the economic trends occurring during the passing and implementation of PRWORA; researchers cannot pinpoint the exact factors that led to the decrease in enrollment in AFDC/TANF, even in times of economic downturn. Some labor economists argue that the continuing decline in AFDC/TANF enrollment was not due to improved standard of living but offset by an exponential growth in the Earned Income Tax Credit, which by 2012 was the largest cash-benefit entitlement program in the United States.

=== Dot com bubble and crash of 2008 ===
The first tests for persistent effects on income and household financial health under PRWORA were the recession caused by the 2001 tech bubble crash and the 2008 economic meltdown caused by the housing bubble and the instability of the financial markets. During these two periods of economic problems, the enrollment in TANF followed a downwards trend. As enrollment in TANF decreased, macroeconomic indicators such as unemployment rate, number of children in poverty and extreme poverty, and number of single-parent households below the poverty line followed an upwards trend with sharp increases during the late 2007–2009 recession. Alleging that enrollment in the program did not track poverty, critics of welfare reform point to this as a failure of the PRWORA.

== Criticism ==
Frances Fox Piven said that the problem with AFDC was not a problem with the welfare system, but with low-wage work:

Logically, but not in the heated and vitriolic politics created by the attack on welfare, a concern with the relationship of welfare to dependency should have directed attention to the deteriorating conditions of the low-wage labor market. After all, if there were jobs that paid living wages, and if health care and child care were available, a great many women on AFDC would leap at the chance of a better income and a little social respect.

PRWORA has been accused of attempting to fight poverty by "controlling the reproductive capacity of women, compelling unmarried mothers to work outside the home, and coercing women into relations with men." Barbara Ehrenreich, a feminist political activist, has said that the bill was motivated by racism and misogyny, using stereotypes of lazy, overweight, slovenly, sexually indulgent and "endlessly fecund" African-American welfare recipients, and assumed that out-of-wedlock births were "illegitimate" and that only a male could confer respectability on a child. PRWORA dismissed the value of the unpaid work of raising a family, and insisted that mothers get paid work, "no matter how dangerous, abusive, or poorly paid".

Three assistant secretaries at the Department of Health and Human Services, Mary Jo Bane, Peter B. Edelman, and Wendell E. Primus, resigned to protest the law. According to Edelman, the 1996 welfare reform law destroyed the safety net. It increased poverty, lowered income for single mothers, put people from welfare into homeless shelters, and left states free to eliminate welfare entirely. It moved mothers and children from welfare to work, but many of them are not making enough to survive. Many of them were pushed off welfare rolls because they didn't show up for an appointment, because they could not get to an appointment for lack of child care, said Edelman, or because they were not notified of the appointment.

=== Causes of poverty ===
Welfare reform efforts such as PRWORA have been criticized for focusing almost exclusively on individual failure and irresponsibility, especially among people of color, as factors leading to poverty. However, there is no scholarly consensus on the etiology of poverty, and many theories focus instead on structural inequalities such as disparities in pay and hiring discrimination. The concept of "personal responsibility" is further critiqued for its lack of consideration of familial responsibilities, such as caring for children and elderly parents, which are placed more heavily upon women.

=== Gendered and racial poverty ===
The bill has also been criticized for ignoring and not accommodating for the complexities of gender, color, and sexual preference discrimination within society that contribute to the poverty of people of color, women, and LGBT people.

Diana Pearce, the director of the Center for Women's Welfare, writes that poverty for women is fundamentally different from that for men, but welfare itself is created for poor men. She asserts that women's poverty is caused by two problems that are unique for women: the responsibility to provide all or most financial support for their children and the disadvantages they face in the labor market. In 1988, the average woman received 66 percent of the income of what an average man earned; the average female college graduate working a full-time job still earned less than the average male high school graduate.

But the earnings disparity is not the only form of disadvantage that women face in the labor market. Many women are unable to obtain a full-time job not just due to gender discrimination, but also because of unavailable, expensive, or inadequate day care. This problem is only amplified when considering the issue of the segregation of women into underpaid work, limiting possibilities of economic growth.

Susan L. Thomas made similar arguments, stating that these disadvantages were created from masculinism. She argued that masculinism gives men more roles in the labor market, while reserving the responsibility of "family" and reproduction to (white) women, resulting in a loss of opportunities for promotions and pressure on women to prioritize their domestic duties and to work jobs that can accommodate for these duties. She asserts that welfare systems, including PRWORA, were not made for women, because they have been created based on the male Breadwinner model, which believes that people are poor because they are jobless and the solution is to give them jobs. But because of the discrimination women faced, simply finding full-time jobs that paid enough money for independence from welfare is not easy for poor women, Thomas proclaimed and added, "for women it is not the lack of employment that leads to their disproportionately high rates of poverty, rather their poverty stems from the ideological consequences of a gender-biased structuring of the distribution of power and privilege." Thomas then criticized the bill for not taking all these factors into consideration when deciding who is "worthy" and "unworthy" of welfare.

==== Propagating stereotypes ====
Many critics have argued that the PRWORA bases its reasoning on the stereotype of single black mothers who receive welfare, commonly known as the "welfare queen." The welfare queen is one who often deliberately and intentionally becomes pregnant in order to increase their welfare. The woman is envisioned as being lazy, uncaring of her children (who are also stereotyped as having been born out-of-wedlock), and unwilling to work. This version of the woman is labelled as "undeserving" of their welfare.

==== Violation of universal human rights ====
The Personal Responsibility and Work Opportunity Act has continuously been criticized for its violations of universal human rights. Susan L. Thomas, a professor at Hollins University, wrote the bill violates Articles 2, 5 and 16 of the Women's Convention as it allows states to fail to "condemn discrimination in all its forms", by promoting patriarchal, heterosexual marriage; discriminating against unmarried mothers and women of color; and infringing on women's constitutional rights to privacy and procreation. Gwendolyn Mink, an Associate Professor of Politics at the University of California, Santa Cruz, has criticized TANF for using marriage as a means of "privatizing poverty, reaffirming patriarchy, and spotlighting women of color as moral failures."

==== Violation of women's constitutional rights ====
PRWORA requires unmarried mothers to identify the father and receive child support from said father. If mothers refuse to comply with these requirements, then their assistance grant is either reduced by at least 25 percent or withheld completely from them by their state. The bill also confers the legal status of parent to the biological fathers, and require unmarried mothers to permit biological fathers to develop "substantial relationships" with their children and to have a claim on the rearing of their children; this is the opposite of paternity law, which holds the "substantial relationship" a prerequisite to parental rights. These requirements have been criticized for violating women's constitutional right to family privacy and their decisions about child-rearing and family life, and ignoring the danger that establishing a connection with an abusive father may cause for both the mother and her children.

According to a study by the National Resource Center on Domestic Violence, it was found that "over half of the women receiving welfare said they had experienced physical abuse by an intimate male partner at some point during their adult lives." According to a mixed methods study about welfare recipients in Allegheny County, PA, in many cases, domestic violence follows a woman to work. This study finds that having a job in a specific location gives their abusive partners a place to follow these women to. As Brush explains, Work becomes a surveillance tactic of abusive men, often putting these women's jobs in jeopardy. Many abusive men also look down on women for their jobs and are unsupportive of their employment. They often prefer their partners to be home, possibly taking care of children they may have, Brush states. Employment is seen as something a woman does for herself, so this is often looked down upon by their abusive partners as they struggle to maintain control over their partners. Work can produce new fuel for conflict as women will be spending less time at home, and will be exposed to new social connections, some financial freedom, etc. Abuse can also interfere with a woman's employment, often causing women to go to the hospital when they should be working or making it so their injuries prevent them from going to work. Finally, conflict can sometimes follow these women to work, putting their employment in jeopardy and thus putting their welfare benefits in jeopardy.

PRWORA requires states to submit a written documentation of their goals and strategies to reduce non-marital pregnancies and births, even offering a financial incentive of $20 million each to five states with the largest declines in their "illegitimacy ratios" and abortion rates. It is argued that this has resulted in states making abortions more inaccessible and legally punishing childbearing by not granting more assistance to families even after the number of children increases. This policy has been criticized for being a punitive system that violates the rights of both the women and their children by intruding on the mothers' constitutional rights to procreation, privacy, and reproductive choice, which includes their decisions to be a parent or not; and penalizing mothers for exercising their right to have children. Susan L. Thomas has pointed out the bill fails to prove enough governmental interest warrants its child exclusionary policy and attempts to conserve money through the penalization of women who exercise their constitutional reproductive rights.

==== Single-mother households and "disconnected" families ====
Jason DeParle of the New York Times, after interviews with single mothers, said that they have been left without means to survive, and have turned to desperate and sometimes illegal ways to survive, including shoplifting, selling blood, scavenging trash bins, moving in with friends, and returning to violent partners.

A study from the Center on Budget and Policy Priorities stated that cutting access to welfare through the PRWORA was "a major factor in the lack of progress in reducing poverty among people in working single-mother families after 1995". While there was improvement in poverty rates for families not headed by single mothers, poor single mother households overall sunk further into poverty.

Economists focusing on antipoverty policy have identified higher percentages of "disconnected" single mother households following the welfare legislation of the 1990s— households in extreme poverty that do not receive government assistance or wages from employment. A study conducted by economists at Rutgers University found that states with stricter limits on receiving benefits before one is required to find work cause more single mothers to become disconnected. These state rules, having been created after the loosening of federal authority by PRWORA, are identified as key considerations in the disconnecting of single mothers.

The "Final Rule" provision enforced by the passing of PRWORA is a provision that attempts to establish paternity for children living in poverty. This provision created a more comprehensive system for establishing paternity of children by increasing access to voluntary paternity tests for men and their possible children. For single mothers attempting to receive child support, these mothers must first establish paternity for their children. This provision creates men's identities as "fathers". In addition, this provision disproportionately affects unwed mothers and attempts to police pre-marital relations by centering single mothers in the discussion of child support and welfare assistance. However, this act in its description claims that it is trying to increase the case-load of child support clients. In its description of the "Final Rule" provision, the Department of Health and Human Services writes that, "In 1992, only 54 percent of single-parent families with children had a child support order established and, of that number, only about one-half received the full amount due." When PRWORA was passed, one of the main concerns of politicians and lawmakers was that there was a high number of single mothers or unwed mothers receiving federal assistance stating that from 1970 to the 1990s, the rate of unwed mothers giving birth had increased three times its original rate, as well as unmarried teen mothers. When PRWORA was being discussed by lawmakers, there was an emphasis on decreasing the amount of single mothers or unwed mothers by promoting marriage and two parent households. PROWRA is legislation that promotes a heteronormative nuclear family structure by encouraging mothers to parent with the fathers of their children.

==== Discrimination against unmarried women and LGBT women ====
When the bill was passed, critics denounced the bill for promoting and enforcing heterosexual marriage, which they argued was made implicit in the bill itself as it states: (1) Marriage is the foundation of a successful society. (2) Marriage is an essential constitution of a successful society, which promotes the interests of children. (3) Promotion of responsible fatherhood and motherhood is integral to successful child rearing and well being of children.

The bill was also stated to discriminate against mothers "who parent[ed] without legal partners." Mothers who "encourage[d] the formation and maintenance of [heterosexual] two-parent families" did not have to work outside the home, even if them not working forced the family to continue to require state assistance. However, mothers who could not or did not want to find men to marry them were required to work outside the home, and unmarried mothers who had received state assistance for two months were required to perform community service. It also required single mothers who had received up to twenty four months of financial assistance, consecutively or not, to work outside the home thirty hours a week, and penalized mothers who did not work thirty hours a week by reducing or terminating her benefits.

Critics have accused PRWORA for discriminating against unmarried women who have never been married, as they are required to "reveal the details of their children's conception to state officials", while divorced, unmarried women are exempt from submitting information, as PRWORA assumes the biological father of the children is the man to whom they were married to when the child was conceived. This has been criticized for violating the women's 14th Amendment right to make marital decisions without governmental interference (based on Loving v. Virginia) and coercing women into creating or maintaining relationships with the biological fathers; this interference also does not satisfy the heightened scrutiny under the Equal Protection Clause.

=== Strict regulations ===
PRWORA has been criticized for its terms, which permit all states to not assist people in poverty, even if they meet all the necessary criteria. It also does not offer additional federal funds to states that have depleted their block grant and contingency funds, thus leaving mothers and children (who meet the eligibility criteria) with no financial assistance.

States are granted more freedom to create regulations that are stricter than federal laws. This manifests in regulations that:

- Make women work outside the home sooner than is required
- Create shorter working time limits than is required
- Allow states to withhold cash benefits in cases where single mothers do not identify the biological father of her children
- Discriminate households in which children are born while the mother is enrolled in welfare by not giving said households benefits
- Withhold welfare from mothers whose children do not attend school without an explanation
- Sanction households with adults younger than fifty-one who do not have and are not actively working to receive a high school diploma
- Require drug tests of recipients
- Enforce welfare regulations of former states for new state residents
- Do not require states to provide cash benefits at all

=== Impeding access to higher education and employment ===
Diana Spatz, executive director of Lifetime, a statewide organization of low-income parents in California, advocates for the repeal of PRWORA because it prevents a woman from doing what she did prior to its passage: earn her bachelor's degree while supported by welfare. Vanessa D. Johnson, a professor at Northeastern University, asserts that the implementation of PRWORA cut access for single mothers, namely African American single mothers, to attaining a higher education for themselves. By creating time limits that force them into working without finishing a degree, Johnson says African American single mothers are left unable to better themselves through education. With education having such a strong correlation to higher wages, she considers it crucial that welfare policies allow for mothers to attend college in order to lift themselves out of poverty.

Another criticism placed on PRWORA by some scholars is that its transition to work provisions negatively affect the ability of low-income mothers enrolled in the program to find a job. Single mothers enrolled in TANF tend to have lower rates of literacy, and therefore finding employment that within the time frame of the "workfare" component becomes more difficult, or leads to underemployment. Welfare-to-work programs have also been criticized for only offering training for low-wage work. An education-first approach has been proposed as an alternative that could provide welfare recipients with more options for employment. Although the incentivization of financial independence is a goal for both recipients and providers, many TANF enrollees feel disincentivized from finding paid work due to low pay and the instability of this transition.

=== Varying rates of success ===
Critics of the law argue that poverty in America increased from 1979 onward after Reagan's presidential campaign criticized deficit spending and that the temporary large reduction in the number of people collecting welfare was largely a result of steady and strong economic growth in the years following enactment of the law. Political scientist Joe Soss questions the definition of success, asking whether "success", as measured by caseload reduction, was merely a political construction for policy makers to easily claim credit in front of their constituencies. In analyzing the effects of welfare reform, he notes that caseload reduction is not very demanding, especially compared to improving material conditions in poor communities:

The TANF program does not offer benefits sufficient to lift recipients out of poverty, and despite a strong economy, the majority of families who have moved off the TANF rolls have remained in poverty. Considerations of another traditional economic goal, reduction of inequality, only makes matters worse. Welfare reform has coincided with massive growth in income and wealth disparities; it has done little to slow the expansion of inequality and may have actually accelerated the trend. Has welfare reform created job opportunities for the poor? Has it promoted wages that allow low-wage workers to escape poverty? In both of these areas, the economic story remains the same: we have little evidence that reform has produced achievements that warrant the label of success.

== See also ==
- Welfare Reform Act of 1997, the primary New York counterpart statute
- The 2007–2009 Great Recession in the United States
- Social programs in the United States
- Child support
- Illegal Immigration Reform and Immigrant Responsibility Act of 1996
- Tax Reform Act of 1986
- Welfare's effect on poverty

International:

- Participation income
- Self-Sufficiency Project
