= Welfare reform =

Changes in a welfare system

Welfare reforms are changes in the operation of a given welfare system aimed at improving the efficiency, equity, and administration of government assistance programs. Reform programs may have a various aims; sometimes the focus is on reducing or increasing the welfare state and at other times reforms may aim to ensure greater fairness and effectiveness at the same total welfare spending. Classical liberals, neoliberals, right-wing libertarians, and conservatives generally criticize welfare and other tax-funded services for reducing incentives to work, exacerbating the free-rider problem and redistribution. On the other hand, in their criticism of capitalism, both social democrats and other socialists generally criticize welfare reforms that minimize the public safety net and strengthen the capitalist economic system. Welfare reform is constantly debated because of the varying opinions on a government's need to balance providing guaranteed welfare benefits and promoting self-sufficiency.

From the 1970s, welfare systems came under greater scrutiny around the world. Demographic changes such as the post-war "baby boom" and the subsequent "baby bust", coupled with economic shifts such as the 1970 oil shocks, led to aging populations, a dwindling workforce, and increased dependency on social welfare systems, which inevitably brought up the issue of welfare reform. U.S. systems primarily focused on reducing poor single parents' need for welfare assistance through employment incentives. The United Kingdom focused primarily on reducing general unemployment through the New Deal introduced by the New Labour government in the 1990s. The Netherlands emphasized reforming disability programs, and Latin America focused primarily on pension reforms.

== History ==
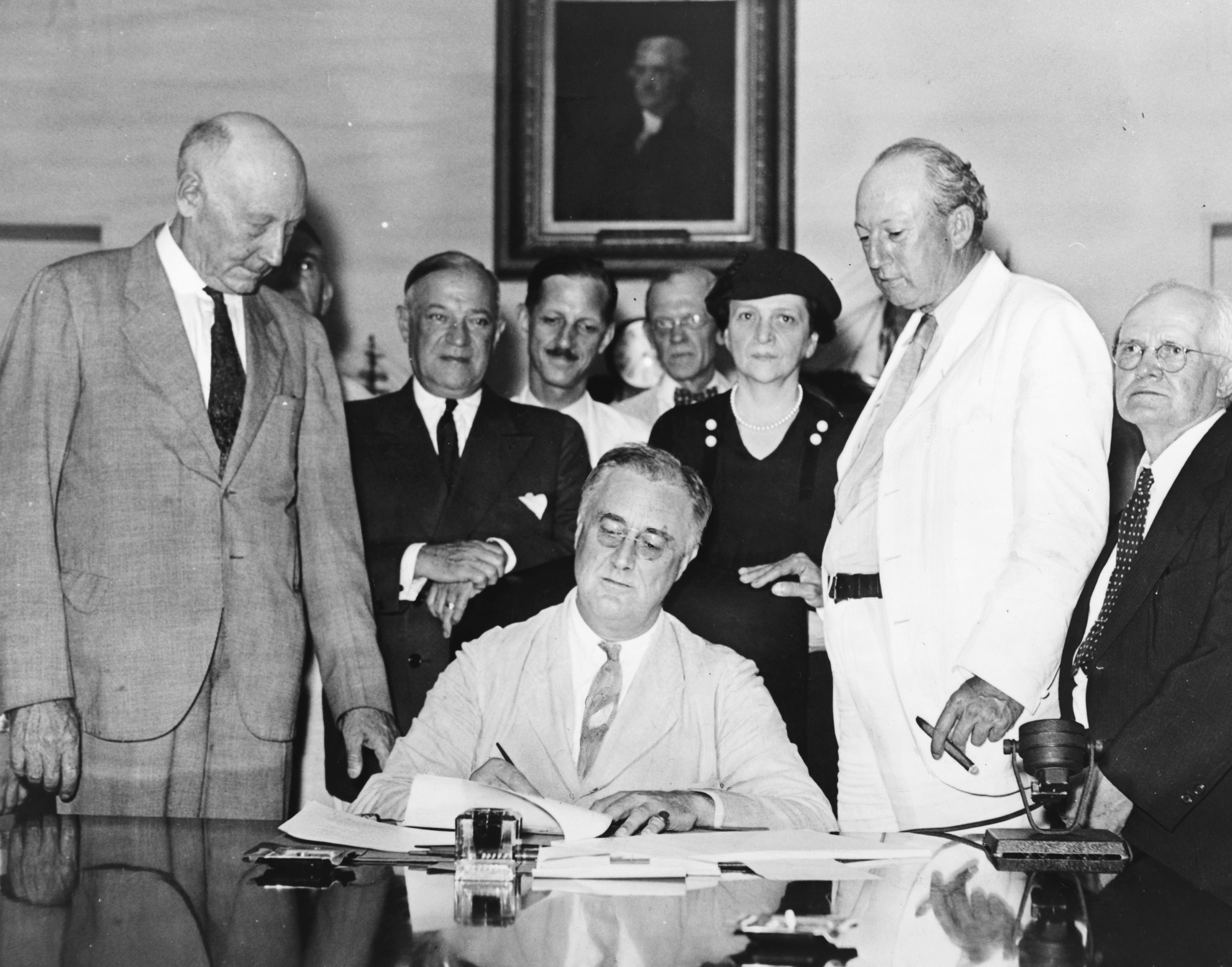
President Franklin D. Roosevelt signing the Social Security Act on 14 August 1935

Many historians trace the beginnings of contemporary welfare in Europe and America to Germany's health insurance laws introduced in the late 19th century. German Chancellor Otto von Bismarck introduced government healthcare and approved the 1883 Health Insurance Act, which was the first to introduce compulsory government-monitored health insurance. The German legislation ensured contributory retirement and disability benefits. Participation became mandatory.

== By country ==
=== United States ===
After a decline in the 1960s, poverty rates remained in a relatively stable range in subsequent decades.

In the United States, the Great Depression led to President Franklin D. Roosevelt's introduction of the Aid to Families with Dependent Children (AFDC) program and the Social Security Program through the Social Security Act, which created a public welfare system to provide assistance to various dependent persons in need. In 1964, President Lyndon B. Johnson introduced pieces of legislation collectively known as the War on Poverty in response to a persistently high poverty rate of approximately 20%. This initiative funded welfare programs such as Social Security, Food Stamps, Job Corps, and Head Start. The war on poverty included new federal programs such as Medicare and Medicaid, which provided seniors, low-income individuals, and other disadvantaged groups with health insurance. Furthermore, the U.S. Government began providing direct assistance to school districts, passed sweeping environmental protections, instituted urban renewal projects, furthered civil rights protections, and expanded funding for the arts and humanities.

President Richard Nixon's administration proposed the 1969 Family Assistance Plan, which instituted a work requirement for all welfare recipients except mothers with children under three years of age. This requirement was removed in 1972 amidst criticism from liberals that the plan provided too little support and having excessively stringent work requirements. Ultimately, the Nixon Administration presided over the continued expansion of welfare programs, however the Family Assistance Plan facilitated greater debate over the state of the welfare system and began the rhetoric for anti-welfare sentiment. In 1981, President Ronald Reagan cut spending for the Aid to Families with Dependent Children (AFDC) program, and allowed states to require welfare recipients to participate in workfare programs. Charles Murray's book Losing Ground (1984) argued that the welfare state actually harms the poor, especially single-parent families, by making them increasingly dependent on the government, and discouraging them from working. Murray proposed that current welfare programs be replaced by short-term local programs.

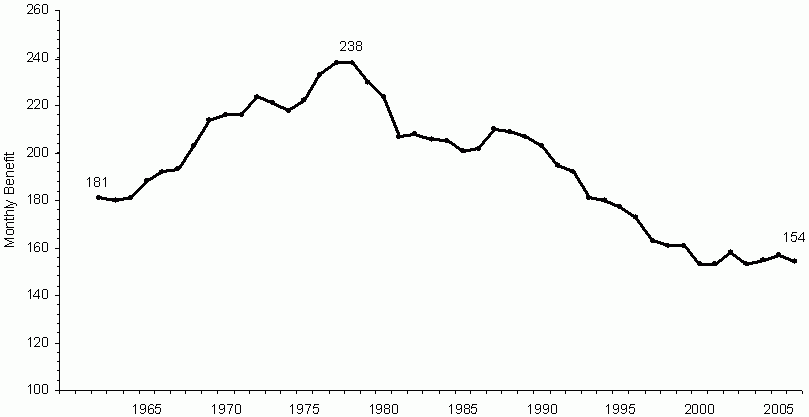
Overall decline in welfare monthly benefits in 2006 dollars

In his 1992 presidential campaign, the Democratic candidate Bill Clinton running as a New Democrat promised to "end welfare as we have come to know it". The Personal Responsibility and Work Opportunity Act was crafted as a response to the perceived failings of AFDC. Concerns about AFDC had started in the 1960s, at the same time when anti-poverty solutions and programs were being debated and created. Some of these concerns included that it: caused family dysfunction among the poor (especially among poor black families as a result of the Moynihan Report), discouraged marriage and promoted single-motherhood, and discouraged poor women from seeking employment by encouraging dependency on government aid. The 1980s concerns about the budget and spending on welfare also intensified with the growth of AFDC caseloads. Concerns about fraudulent welfare claims, dependency, and misuse by recipients created the stereotypical trope of the "welfare queen". Between the late 1980s and early 1990s, growing public concern about out-of-wedlock births and teen pregnancy also fueled concern towards AFDC. Despite the public and political concerns, "sociologists, poverty analysts, and ethnographers have demonstrated that AFDC itself had little impact on women’s marital or childbearing decisions and the program acted for most recipients as a supplement to earnings or as a temporary source of support between periods of employment."

In addition to public and political perception of welfare, also important to welfare reform is the drastic change in women's labor market participation since ADC was first enacted. By the 1990s it was more common for women to engage in waged work, and this change contributed to the expectation that women receiving welfare should be required to do work outside the home. The economic and social context of the labor market had changed as well. Jobs that provided a steady and livable family wage had declined over the decades, the growth and expansion of the low-wage labor market had created jobs that provided little economic security or chance for upward economic mobility. The idea of the work-first approach to work requirements prioritized getting recipients to quickly enter the job market, with the work programs offered focusing on job readiness and immediate job placement at the first available job. These concerns about the women receiving AFDC and the impact of the program on marriage and motherhood, as well as the increased demand for low-wage, low-skilled workers in the job market and the expectation for women to participate in the labor-market provide the context for the 1996 welfare reform act. The 1996 PRWORA ended AFDC and replaced it with Temporary Assistance for Needy Families. The most significant change from AFDC to TANF is the end to an individual entitlement for poor families to receive federal aid.

=== United Kingdom ===
==== New Deal ====
In recent years reform of the welfare system in Britain began with the introduction of the New Deal programme, which was introduced by the Labour Party government under Tony Blair in 1997. The aim of this programme was to increase employment through requiring that recipients make serious efforts to seek employment. The Labour Party also introduced a system of tax credits for low-income workers.

==== Welfare Reform Act 2007 ====
The Welfare Reform Act 2007 provides for "an employment and support allowance, a contributory allowance, [and] an income-based allowance". The objectives of the Welfare Reform Act of 2007 were to increase the employment rate to 80% from 75%, to assist 300,000 single parents find employment, to increase the number of workers over 50 by 1 million, and to reduce the number of people claiming incapacity benefits by 2 million.

==== Welfare Reform Act 2009 ====
This welfare reform proposed an increase of personal responsibility within the welfare system. The reform eliminated Income support, and allocated funds over to the Jobseeker's allowance, to encourage employment. It also encouraged increased parental responsibility by amending child support laws, and requiring births be registered jointly by both parents.

==== Welfare Reform Act 2012 ====
This welfare reform proposed changes to the Housing Benefit, which reduced the benefit paid to recipients depending on the size of their living space. This act got the nickname of the "Bedroom Tax". from the media. It was stated that similarly to other welfare reforms, this act would reduce welfare dependency.

=== France ===
Beginning in the mid-1970s, a deficit in the social insurance program began to appear. The deficit saw peaks at 27.75% of the social insurance budget in 1992. This led to a major push by the government to cut back spending in the welfare program. By the end of the 1990s the deficit had been almost completely eradicated. The often large deficits that the program has endured has led to a tremendous amount of opposition to the program as it stands. In February 2020, a pension overhaul was adopted by decree using Article 49 of the French constitution.

=== Brazil ===
During the 2015–2018 Brazilian economic crisis, there was both economic and political turmoil. President Dilma Rousseff, who was later impeached and replaced by President Michel Temer, strived to expand the social welfare program Bolsa Família instated by her predecessor Luiz Inácio Lula da Silva. As a social democrat, Rousseff pledged that "Brazil will continue to grow, with social inclusion and mobility." When Michel Temer took office, to cope with the severe economic recession, he proposed social welfare reforms to change labor rules and the social security pension system. Temer's plan included limiting pension benefits and raising the retirement age in order to save money and fix the economy. Additionally, under his reform, companies have greater power to require longer work days and use part-time workers. In response to this reform, labor unions, rural workers, and government employees held protests all over Brazil. The vote to approve the pension reform was first suspended until February 2018, and now has been further postponed as a campaign issue in this year's election. Temer's critics believe that the reason for the postponed reform is its vast public disapproval.

=== India ===
India has taken substantial strides toward dramatically reforming its welfare architecture over the last five years especially, ranging from direct benefit transfers (DBT), Ayushman Bharat, income support (PM-Kisan), and the implementation of the 14th Finance Commission recommendations; however, crucial unanswered and hotly debated concerns regarding the welfare state's architecture lie under these changes. The issues are concentrated on centralisation and the ability of different levels of government to deliver. The new government's welfare policy would inevitably have to address these issues, as well as the opportunities and threats they raise. The new government's ability to manage this complexity would decide its ability to provide high-quality public services to India's poorest citizens. But the trend of introducing welfare reforms has not been introduced lately as some schemes were brought into action since the 1960s. Hence, giving an insight in India's historical background of welfare schemes is essential to form the base layer for further examples.

==== India's banks nationalized ====
Indira Gandhi, who was both Prime Minister and Finance Minister in charge, agreed to nationalize 14 of the country's largest private banks on 19 July 1969. In 1955, with Imperial Bank having already been nationalized and renamed State Bank of India, this decision in 1969, effectively placed 80 percent of banking assets under state control. Nationalization of banks was defined as the "single most significant economic decision taken by any government since 1947" in the third volume of the Reserve Bank of India's history. The aim of nationalizing banks was to align the banking sector with the Indian government's post-independence socialist goals. According to the RBI's records, the proposal to nationalize banks and insurance companies was first proposed in a report by the All India Congress Committee in 1948.

Nationalization of banks is perhaps the most significant systemic change in the financial sector in India's post-independence period. Bank nationalization, according to the second volume of the Reserve Bank of India's official history after 1947, was the single most critical economic policy decision made by any government. After 1967, banks were not lending to agriculture nor lending enough to industries making these sectors face heavy crisis. There has long been a perception that Indian banks are unwilling to lend money especially to agriculture sector. Furthermore, since private banks were controlled by large industrialists, they often ended up lending to themselves. The top bank directors have held directorships in a variety of other sectors, creating a conflict of interest. Aside from political and economic considerations, there were also banking considerations. Some included, examining the escalating economic crisis that afflicted the 1960s. Removing the few's monopoly in the banking sector. Ensuring adequate credit for agriculture, small businesses, and exports. Professionalizing the banking sector's management. Encouraging new business owners and enhancing and developing India's rural areas. This action resulted in a significant rise in bank deposits and investment and this transition had a long-term effect on the success of small-scale industries and agriculture. It has also resulted in increased bank penetration in rural India.

==== Pradhan Mantri Jan Dhan Yojana (PMJDY) ====
Prime Minister Narendra Modi launched this financial inclusion programme in the year 2014. It aims at laying the groundwork for the construction of the infrastructure needed to implement direct cash transfers across the region. The Jan Dhan Yojana, which pledges each Indian household a bank account, insurance coverage, and overdraft facility over the next two years, would give the government the opportunity to implement a universal basic income transfer to all people, reshaping the country's affluent economy and even the dysfunctional welfare system. Until now, the scheme hasn't proved much beneficial in organising the welfare system of India and the country still awaits it advantages.

==== Technology, income support, citizens and bureaucracy ====
For the last decade, technology has been at the forefront of the welfare reform project. When the National Democratic Alliance (NDA) first came to power in 2014, it adopted Aadhar (national document) and DBT (direct benefit transfers) systems (effort and rapid progress) and just 28 schemes used DBT to pass funds in March 2014 but by May 2019 it had risen to over 400. With the introduction of PM-Kisan in January 2019, India made its first national attempt to implement a basic income support programme using the DBT architecture; however, putting too much emphasis on technology to enforce DBT has revealed three major flaws in the system: the last-mile challenge, a lack of reliable data to identify beneficiaries, and citizen alienation. The desire to reduce payment leakage and increase performance is a key reason for scaling DBT and shifting toward direct cash transfers by income support programmes. In arguing for a Universal Basic Income (UBI), the 2017 Economic Survey claimed that income transfers have the ability to reduce bureaucratic layers by transferring money directly into beneficiary accounts. This will minimise corruption by reducing discretion and simplifying monitoring.

2020s research show that having the DBT architecture correct necessitates substantial bureaucratic interference, rather than reducing it. Local bureaucrats are important to DBT, from opening accounts to fostering financial literacy and facilitating bank transactions. Muralidharan et al. recently completed a Niti Aayog-commissioned process monitoring exercise by using DBT to access the Public Distribution System scheme in three Union Territories (Chandigarh, Dadra & Nagar Haveli, and Puducherry). Muralidharan et al. discovered that 20% of beneficiaries acknowledged not receiving payment, despite official records indicating a transfer rate of failure of less than 1%. The study attributes the difference to a lack of beneficiary awareness and knowledge of transactions, as well as administrative problems such as amount paid into bank accounts that recipients may not have access to, or processing errors.

Once a new welfare reform system in inculcated into the system, it may face challenges, and technology can produce centralized networks that are perceived as distant and perplexing to average people, in ways similar to the daily interactions readers of this document have had with call centre agents. When citizens' rights are denied, digital welfare programmes run the risk of closing off spaces for citizens to petition, protest, and seek transparency and the point being made here is not to argue against efficiency of administration. Therefore, a balance must be struck between centralized power for performance and decentralized, citizen-centric governance for responsiveness.

=== Canada ===
In 1945, the White Paper on Employment and Income was introduced by Prime Minister William Lyon Mackenzie King. At this time, King had already begun to change and remove many of the previous policies for state intervention that were established during the world war periods. This paper focused on a new Keynesian approach to economic management, such as full employment and high income. Full employment was to be mainly achieved through assistance to private enterprises. In this regard, King deviated from the idea of expanding welfare measures and wanted to instead focus on liberal corporatism. However, despite this new approach, the King government did eventually go on to expand some social insurance and health measures.

Between 1951 and 1952 there were several key welfare reforms in Canada. Under then Prime Minister, Louis St. Laurent, an amendment to the Indian Act was made in 1951, to allow Indigenous people to apply for provincial social welfare for the first time. This permitted Indigenous people to collect cash benefits. However, these changes to the Indian Act also gave more powers to the provinces over the lives of Indigenous people. Under this amendment, the provinces were permitted to take Indigenous children under their care which facilitated the beginning of a period in the 1960s where many Indigenous children were forcibly taken from their homes and enrolled into residential schools, or placed with other families. Prime Minister St. Laurent also adopted universal old-age pensions for Canadians over 70, and means-test old age security for Canadians between 65 and 70 in the period of 1951 to 1952. In 1956, the Unemployment Assistance Act was also adopted under St. Laurent due to increasing pressure from the provinces over high unemployment rates.

During the beginning of the 1960s, the country saw the introduction of three key pieces of legislation of the modern Canadian welfare state. In 1964, under Prime Minister Lester B. Pearson, the National Housing Act was amended significantly to allow for federal loans to the provinces for the establishment of public housing, up to 90% of the cost of construction. Following this development, in 1965 the Canada Pension Plan and Quebec Pension Plan were established as a national compulsory contributory pension plan. In 1966, the Canada Assistance Plan was made to merge the Unemployment Assistance Act with other assistance plans such as those for the physically disabled and single parents. The Canadian Assistance plan also established a federal cost-sharing mechanism for social service such as a national healthcare system. The provinces became responsible for administering the new national healthcare systems within their own jurisdictions.

In 1971, under the government of Pierre Elliott Trudeau, Unemployment Insurance coverage was expanded to an extent that it became almost universal. At this point, the only people who were excluded from coverage were the self-employed, people over the age of 70, and people who did not earn the minimum weekly earnings of 20% of the maximum weekly insurable earnings. One of the main goals was to "provide adequate income support for all persons experiencing temporary earnings interruptions". This new amendment liberalized the former system. The National Housing Act was also expanded under Trudeau to cover co-operative and non-profit assistance. In 1978, for the first time the tax system was also used to provide Canadians with a child tax credit. The 1970s in Canada saw economic stagnation and rising inflation. This led to a new conservative political approach that rejected the former Keynesian beliefs held by Prime Ministers such as Mackenzie King. This decade favoured politicians who promised decreasing government expenditure on social programs. During this time unemployment was used strategically to reduce wage increases and inflation. In 1977, the Established Programs Financing and Fiscal Arrangements Act "replaced the previous federal–provincial cost-sharing arrangements, which were conditional grants, with a formula that increased federal contributions to provincial programs according to increases in gross national product". Arguably this decade saw the beginning of the decline of the Canadian welfare state.

In 1989 the federal Family Allowance was terminated. As a result of similar measures such as reductions and terminations of welfare programs, the 1980s and 1990s saw a rise in charity based institutions such as food banks and emergency shelters. This was due to the lack of government-funded facilities, and the growth of unemployment and housing costs. In 1995, under the government of Jean Chrétien, the Canada Assistance Plan was terminated. It was a federal-provincial cost sharing agreement. In 1996 it was replaced by the Canada Health and Social Transfer which provided funds to provinces and territories to support health care, post-secondary education, social assistance and social services. The Canada Health and Social Transfer "was a combination of the 1977 tax transfer and a cash transfer, and the total was allocated on an equal per capita basis". Following the adoption of this plan, many provinces adopted workfare policies which placed pressure on those who were deemed employable to find employment and leave welfare. This included single parents and people with addictions. In keeping with the trend of this decade, the federal government also raised the requirements for unemployment insurance to require 30% more hours worked to qualify. In 1997, the Social Union Framework Agreement was signed by the Federal government and every province except Québec. This agreement helped to increase funds once again in the areas of health care, social assistance, and social services under a neoliberal approach.

Prime Minister Stephen Harper focused his welfare policies mainly on reducing the public service and supporting families. To achieve this, in 2006 Harper passed the Universal Child Care Benefit. This benefit provided $100 a month per child to households caring for a child under the age of six. This program is similar to the previous Family Allowance that was terminated. In 2022, under the current Prime Minister Justin Trudeau, the federal government finalized an agreement with all the provinces and one territory for a publicly funded, Canada-wide system of childcare. Trudeau promised to deliver $10 a day daycare for families in Canada.

=== Netherlands ===
In 2023, the Future Pensions Act came into effect revising the Dutch pension system.

== See also ==
- Austerity
- Self-Sufficiency Project
- Social reform
- Welfare dependency
- Workfare
