= Self-Sufficiency Project =

1990s Canadian workfare program

The Self-Sufficiency Project was a Canadian experiment in the 1990s that provided a "generous, time-limited earnings supplement available to single parents who had been on welfare for a least a year, and who subsequently left welfare and found full-time work."

The study found that individuals offered a SSP subsidy were four percent more likely to stay on welfare to receive the benefit, but once people qualified for the SSP supplement, 44% left welfare dependence and were employed full-time—defined as working at least 30 hours a week. The program was interesting since increases in employment boosted payroll and other taxes to a large enough extent that the subsidy paid for itself.

Later research suggested that the control group was on trend to catch-up with those who received the supplement in the long-run.

== Studies ==
Berkeley's David Card has studied this extensively with several papers, revealing the aforementioned results.

== See also ==
- Welfare reform
- Welfare state
- Welfare
- Workfare

International:

- Personal Responsibility and Work Opportunity Act
