= Joseph Mitchell (city manager) =

Newburgh, New York, city official (1922–1993)

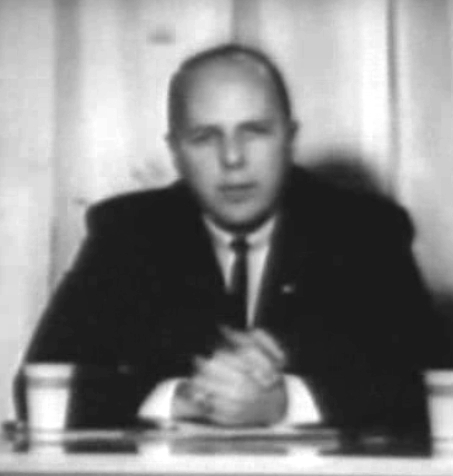
- Mitchell at a city forum in 1961

City manager of Newburgh, New York
- In office October 17, 1960 – September 6, 1963
- Preceded by: Albert J. Abrams
- Succeeded by: Thomas L. Rose

Personal details
- Born: March 25, 1922 Chevy Chase, Maryland, U.S.
- Died: March 26, 1993 (aged 71) Bunnell, Florida, U.S.
- Education: University of Maryland; American University; University of Southern California
- Known for: anti-welfare policies in Newburgh

Joseph McDowell Mitchell (March 25, 1922 – March 26, 1993) was a local official who served as city manager of Newburgh, New York, from 1960 to 1963. During his tenure there—a period known as the "Battle of Newburgh"—he introduced a wide-ranging reform plan aiming to scale back and regulate the provision of welfare in the city. Though only a small part of his plan was implemented due to opposition from the state government and successive court injunctions against it, his efforts garnered him national fame, attracting the praise of conservative figures such as Barry Goldwater and the condemnation of moderates and liberals, and gave him a historical legacy as a pioneer of workfare policies.

Mitchell was born in Maryland, and held office as a municipal administrator in California and Pennsylvania before coming to Newburgh. He resigned his position there in 1963 after an accusation of bribery, despite his acquittal of the charge, and went on to be associated with the White Citizens' Councils until 1966. He returned to his vocation as a city manager and ultimately retired in Florida, where he died in 1993.

== Education and early career ==
Mitchell was born in Chevy Chase, Maryland, on March 25, 1922. He studied political science at the University of Maryland as an undergraduate, followed by postgraduate courses in municipal government at the American University and the University of Southern California. He began his career in city management as assistant city manager of Culver City, California, in 1957, and subsequently held office as township manager of Marple Township, Pennsylvania. His legacy in the latter position was controversial: historian Rick Perlstein labels his tenure at Marple Township "disastrous".

== Battle of Newburgh ==
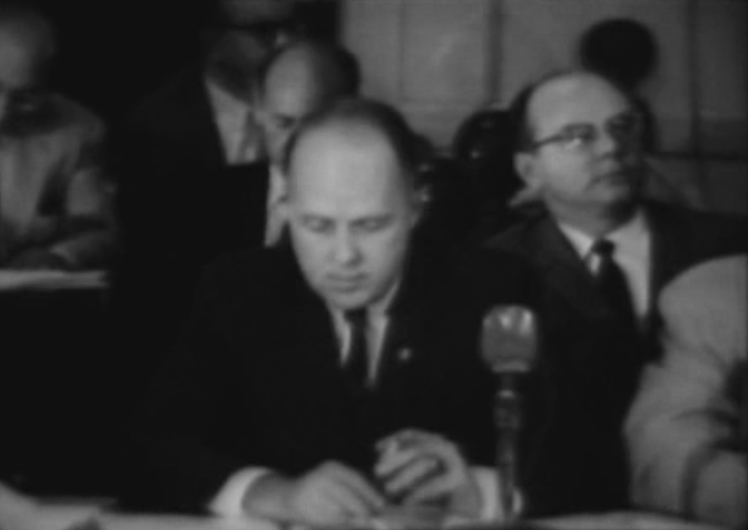
Mitchell at a meeting of the Newburgh City Council

Mitchell became city manager of Newburgh on October 17, 1960, succeeding Albert J. Abrams, who had resigned in August. Mitchell had been tapped by conservative city councillor George McKneally, who was concerned over the influx of African-American internal immigrants to the city—a phenomenon he ascribed to the city's generous welfare policies. Soon after assuming office, Mitchell introduced a range of controversial welfare reforms, which made him a popular figure among American conservatives, while attracting strong criticism from liberals. The dispute over his reforms became known as the "Battle of Newburgh", following an NBC White Paper documentary aired under that title in 1962.

=== Reform measures ===
Mitchell's first welfare directive came early in 1961. Aiming to offset a deficit in the city budget that had been incurred by recent snow removal efforts, he ordered payments to be withdrawn from thirty families receiving Aid to Families with Dependent Children whom the city government considered "borderline" cases. The decision was overturned by New York state officials, and the status of most of the families was restored. Mitchell nonetheless pressed forward with his reform efforts. In April–May 1961 he conducted a "muster" of all the welfare recipients in the city, requiring them to report to the police station at City Hall to be interrogated over their status before they could collect their benefits—though, in the end, no cases of fraud were uncovered.

Following the muster, Mitchell called for the institution of a work-relief program requiring able-bodied welfare recipients to work eight hours a day for the city government. The state authorities again struck down the plan, and the city government announced in response that it would decline funding for welfare from the state for the following year, freeing Mitchell and the local administration to pursue a program of their own making. On June 12, the City Council voted to hand Mitchell full authority over the city's welfare department.

Mitchell's reforms culminated in a wide-ranging thirteen-point program that was passed by the City Council on June 19, 1961. Its text was syndicated in newspapers around the nation. The program, which he termed a "new Welfare Code", included provisions requiring welfare recipients to attend police stations on a monthly basis to confirm their status, and withholding relief from those who had left their job voluntarily or turned down an offer of employment, "regardless of the type of employment involved". The plan proposed to replace cash disbursements with vouchers for food, clothing, and rent, and threatened unwed mothers who gave birth to further illegitimate children with the withdrawal of their benefits. It required able-bodied men on relief to work 40 hours a week for the city.

The Thirteen Points were implemented on July 15, 1961, and the beginning of the new policies received wide media coverage. Despite the stipulation that able-bodied welfare recipients report to work for the municipal government on that day, however, only one man presented himself to the authorities—an unemployed iron worker with six children. Though Mitchell's reforms were ostensibly struggling, his support continued to grow.

=== Accusations of racism ===
Joseph Mitchell welfare comment
Mitchell justifies his welfare reforms at a public appearance in 1961

The policies Mitchell introduced in Newburgh attracted international media coverage, and generated controversy across America. The New York Times reported that the debate over Newburgh was as heated as those over "such cosmic matters as nuclear bomb tests or the fate of Berlin". Mitchell was at loggerheads from the beginning with the mayor of Newburgh, William D. Ryan, and he was condemned by New York's moderate Republican governor, Nelson Rockefeller. Defending himself on June 18, Mitchell stated that the "welfare state ... [was] helping to make a nation of parasites": "the mushy rabble of do-gooders and bleeding hearts in society and politics have marched under the Freudian flag toward the omnipotent state of Karl Marx". He labeled state welfare officials investigating his policies "Gestapo officials". The New York Times began covering the controversy in May, and on June 29 it published a front-page editorial arguing that Mitchell had brought the "Dark Ages" to Newburgh, and that "cruelty anywhere is the concern of mankind everywhere".

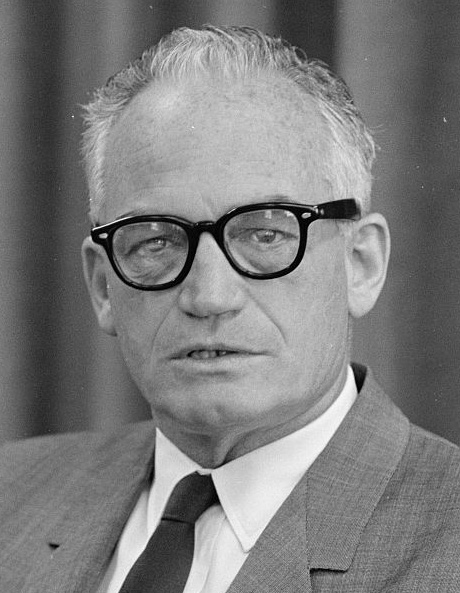
Senator Barry Goldwater praised Mitchell for his "stand against welfarism".

While welfare advocates had quickly rallied against the Newburgh program, however, Mitchell also found a wealth of support among Americans discontented with what they saw as the overreach of the contemporary welfare system. Look magazine remarked that a "visible wave of resentment" of generous welfare policies had gripped the nation. The Wall Street Journal praised Mitchell's "effort to correct flagrant welfare abuse", and conservative senator Barry Goldwater, the subsequent Republican presidential nominee, met him in person in July 1961 to congratulate his "stand against welfarism". Young Americans for Freedom organized a demonstration in support of Mitchell, and in October 1961 a Gallup poll showed "wide-spread public approval" of his plan for Newburgh.

Much of the controversy focused on the racial motivations of Mitchell's program. One reporter commented at the time that "those most ardently on Mitchell's side" were especially concerned by "the increase in [Newburgh's] Negro population". On an episode of the national TV and radio public affairs program Forum, Mitchell remarked that race was "of no consequence" to his reforms, but he added that nonwhite immigration had "contributed to the rise of the slums" in the city and the exodus of "more constructive or productive citizens". Referring partly to Mitchell and Newburgh, in fall 1961 Leo Perliss, a spokesman for the AFL–CIO trade union federation, stated that the opponents of welfare "are against it ... because they don't like the Negro and the Puerto Rican, because they distrust anyone who is not quite like they are", while welfare advocate Max Hahn told New York state welfare commissioner Raymond Houston that he was "a little afraid" of the national repercussions of "Newburgh plus the Puerto Rican situation ... in New York".

=== Court injunction and resignation ===
Seeking a resolution to the Newburgh crisis, Governor Rockefeller set up a commission to investigate Mitchell under the Moreland Act, and directed state attorney general Louis J. Lefkowitz to find a way to end the reform plan for good. At a press conference in New York City on June 22, 1961, state authorities declared that the Thirteen Points violated relevant regulations. The City Council implemented the plan on July 15 against the state's objections. On August 18, 1961, however, in the case of State Board of Social Welfare v. City of Newburgh, the Orange County Supreme Court granted a temporary injunction striking down twelve of the Thirteen Points; the program finally collapsed after the New York Supreme Court rendered the injunction permanent on December 19, 1961. (Note: The courts upheld the provision mandating welfare recipients to report for monthly checks on their legitimacy.)

Mitchell continued in office as city manager, but his support in Newburgh began to falter. State welfare officials investigating the city released a damaging report on his policies in March 1962. NBC's documentary on Mitchell and his reforms, The Battle of Newburgh, "portrayed [him] as a demagogue" and was seen as casting an unwanted negative light on the city. Finally, in December, he was accused of accepting a bribe of $20,000 over a zoning issue. He suspended himself without pay from his position until he was acquitted of the charge in April 1963. Despite his acquittal, his public approval declined; even Councilman McKneally, Mitchell's original nominator for the post of city manager, withdrew his support. He announced his resignation in early July 1963, formally stepping down on September 6.

== Activism and later life ==
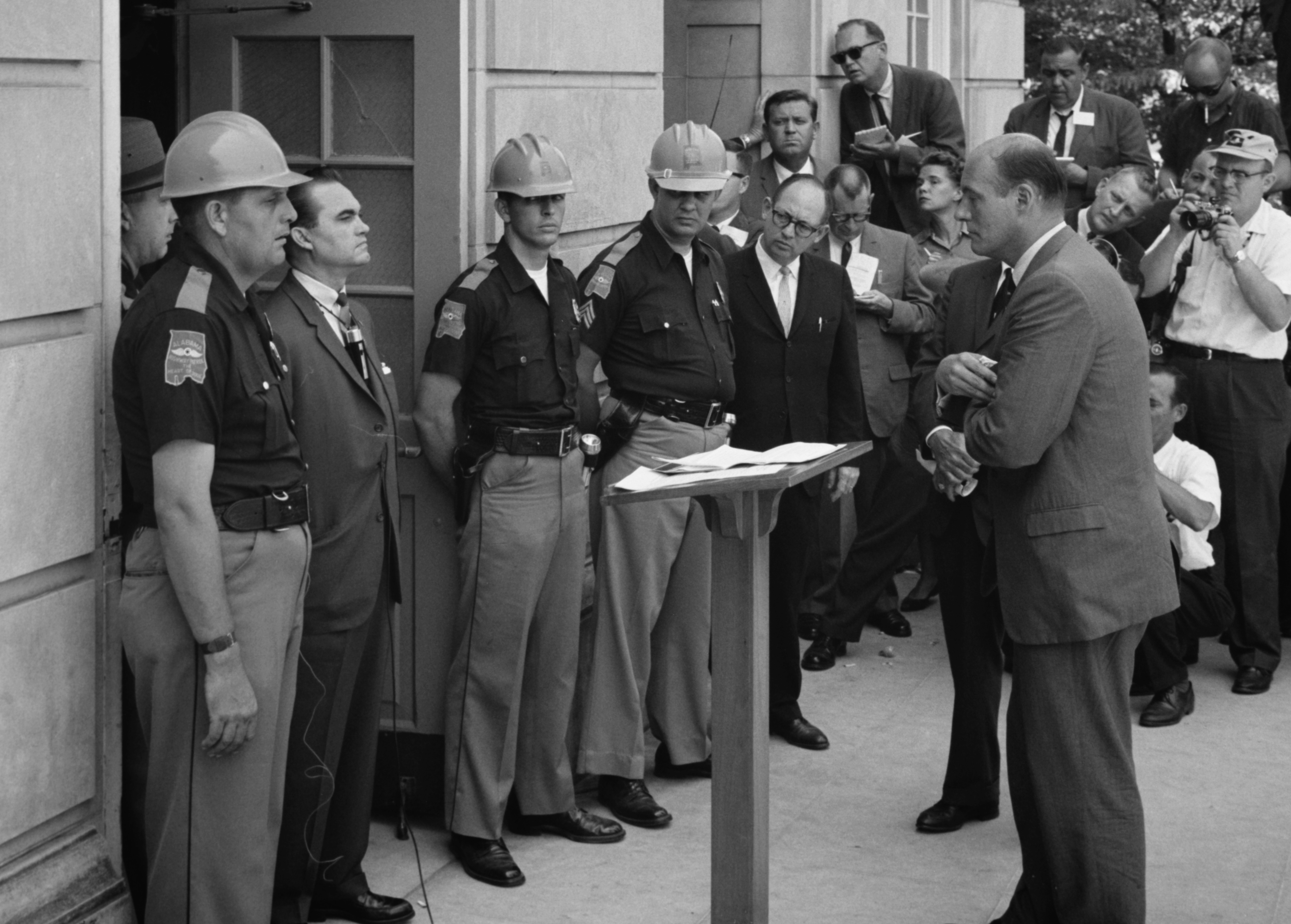
George Wallace (left) stands against desegregation: following his resignation in 1963, Mitchell supported Wallace's campaign against desegregation.

Following his resignation, Mitchell was expelled from the City Managers Association. He announced that he would become a director of the John Birch Society, though he later changed his mind and turned down the position. He eventually assumed a post as field director of the segregationist Maryland and Virginia Citizens' Councils, stating that he was answering George Wallace's call to "stand up and be counted". He supported Wallace's bid for the Democratic presidential nomination in 1964, campaigning for him in Maryland. Mitchell's comments at this time were representative of the pro-segregation movement: in one televised appearance during the primaries, he singled out the white supporters of the Civil Rights Movement for criticism, labeling them "the fringe, scum of society that is doing this and causing this trouble".

In 1966, however, Jet magazine reported that Mitchell had disavowed the Citizens' Councils. He commented that he had joined the Councils because he "had no work at the time", but in the end he "couldn't bring [him]self to hate". He subsequently returned to local administration, having been readmitted to the City Managers Association, and continued to serve as city manager in other towns. He became city manager of Haines City, Florida, in 1974, then Cocoa Beach in 1977, and ultimately retired in that state. He died on March 26, 1993, in Bunnell, Florida.

== Legacy ==
Mitchell was an early advocate for the policy model that would later be labeled "workfare". Despite his failure to implement the bulk of his welfare plan, welfare historians such as Karen M. Tani have cited Mitchell's reforms as a turning point in the development of welfare policy in the United States—arguing in Tani's case that the Newburgh incident reflected the birth of a new national trend of "moralistic, racially-coded, and taxpayer-oriented" discourse on welfare. In 1977, local media saw President Jimmy Carter's welfare policies as echoing Mitchell's proposals in Newburgh:

Vilified by many critics 16 years ago, Joseph Mitchell is now regarded by others as a man whose welfare ideas were ahead of their time. Branded as checkbrained in 1961, some of his ideas are now orthodox social policy espoused by no less a person [than] the President of the United States.

— Edward Lown, The Evening News

Later, in 1992, New York Senator Daniel Patrick Moynihan called for Mitchell's plan to be re-examined, suggesting that while his specific policies may have been misguided, the questions he posed were valid. Mitchell, still alive at the time, was asked by the New York Times for his views on the similarity between his policies in Newburgh and the proposals being made in the 1990s: he replied simply, "I'm aware of that."

== Sources ==
- Hohle, Randolph (2015). Race and the Origins of American Neoliberalism. New York and London: Routledge.
- Leman, Christopher (1980). The Collapse of Welfare Reform: Political Institutions, Policy, and the Poor in Canada and the United States. Cambridge, MA: MIT Press. ISBN 9780262120814.
- Mitchell, Joseph McDowell (1961). "The Newburgh Revolt". County Government. 1: 46.
- Mittelstadt, Jennifer (2005). From Welfare to Workfare: The Unintended Consequences of Liberal Reform, 1945–1965. Chapel Hill, NC: The University of North Carolina Press.
- Neubeck, Kenneth J.; Cazenave, Noel A. (2001). Welfare Racism: Playing the Race Card Against America's Poor. New York and London: Routledge.
- Ottoman, Tod M. (2005). "Battle of Newburgh". In Eisenstadt, Peter (ed.). The Encyclopedia of New York State. Syracuse, NY: Syracuse University Press. pp. 161–2.
- Parsons, Jack R. (1970). "The Paranoid Style in American Politics: An Essay Review". Social Service Review. 44 (2): 184–195. doi:10.1086/642529. JSTOR 30021663. S2CID 144887290.
- Patterson, James T. (1995). America's Struggle against Poverty in the Twentieth Century. Cambridge, MA: Harvard University Press.
- Perlstein, Rick (2009). Before the Storm: Barry Goldwater and the Unmaking of the American Consensus. New York: Nation Books.
- Rolph, Stephanie R. (2012). "Courting Conservatism: White Resistance and the Ideology of Race in the 1960s". In Gifford, Laura Jane; Williams, Daniel K. (eds.). The Right Side of the Sixties: Reexamining Conservatism's Decade of Transformation. New York: Palgrave Macmillan. pp. 21–40.
- Tani, Karen M. (2016). States of Dependency: Welfare, Rights, and American Governance, 1935–1972. New York: Cambridge University Press.
