= Participation income =

Revenue concept

Participation income (PI) is a method of delivering unemployment benefits by creating socially useful but non-commercial employment opportunities. It is similar to Universal Basic Income in that everyone enjoys a measure of financial security, but obliges claimants to actively engage in socially desirable projects as temporary or contract employees of the social welfare entity. They draw basic wages according to their attendance record with bonuses for notable achievements.

It differs from workfare in that it is a voluntary, albeit highly incentivized, occupational proposal which respects the human dignity of participants and could reduce clinical depression and the risk of suicide in situations of vulnerability.

== The model ==
The original participation income model (PI) was proposed by Tony Atkinson a researcher at Nuffield College, Oxford around 1996 but would have been administratively cumbersome and possibly in contravention of human rights UDHR Article 4 (forced labour).

Recent interest in the proposal arises from the perceived threat posed by robotic labour-saving technologies (LST), also known as technological unemployment

- Proposition 1: humanity may be heading towards a future in which menial tasks could be outsourced to smart machines, greatly reducing labour costs and improving accuracy of productive and service operations
- Proposition 2: such transformation risks displacing less able people from wage labor, leading to the growth of unemployment, financial precariousness and social inequality
- Proposition 3: Cristian Pérez-Muñoz of Cambridge University (UK) claims that there are pragmatic and normative reasons to prefer PI over alternative redistributive policies, such as an unconditional basic income and workfare programmes.

Differences between workfare and PI:

- Workfare in its narrowest definition is mandatory “work for benefits” government subsidies to individuals (and by extension, their employers). It is part of a larger array of means-tested benefits that are prominent in the Western – notably Anglo-USA cultural concepts such as moral hazard. The socialist leaning is generally in favor of universal mechanisms such as the universal basic income (UBI) but, in the conservative ideology, those supporting “workfare” tend to impose a host of conditional measures in order to restrict access any publicly funded benefits.
- PI represents as a particular type of civic service programme designed to address a large number of unmet social needs that are not met by commercial enterprise but which addresses in a manner similar to the USA peace corps model.

The Desire to Work Scale addresses eagerness to work and one’s sense of pride and self-worth derived from working. Strong desire to work is a positive reference to potential employment longevity. Higher scores indicate someone who tends to focus their energy on their work and to define themselves by the work they do.

The rationale for PI is connected with degrowth economics and post-productivism which seeks to recover time for activities which have sustainable (rather than productive) value, such as giving care and maintaining the environment, tasks which can never be fully valued in economic terms. Recognising time poverty (from workaholism) and autonomy as central concerns, PI stresses the tensions in balancing time, work and income support, while feminists consistently draw attention to the need for time for care, for both men and women. PI seeks to widen the range of activities, interests and social cohesion of individual adults of working age

== See also ==
- Intentional community - also known as a commune
- Neo-Luddism
- Reserve army of labour
- Social insurance
- Unemployment benefits
- Universal inheritance
- Welfare State
