= Universal inheritance =

Universal inheritance or basic inheritance is a proposal for all citizens, upon reaching a certain age, to receive an economic endowment from the state.

From heterodox economic perspectives, inheritance has been criticized both from a historical standpoint, as property and inequality in its distribution couldn't be understood without the original accumulation of capital; and from an ethical and justice standpoint, as no human being would have the right to greater ownership over Earth's wealth solely by the circumstance of being born into one family or another.

In this manner, universal inheritance has been proposed as a way to offset wealth distribution inequality, funded through progressive taxes.

The first proposal for universal inheritance was made by Thomas Paine in 1795, although similar measures have been proposed in different countries and historical moments since then.

Among the criticisms of this measure is the fact that it's proposed as an inheritance for all citizens, regardless of their economic status. Additionally, it could lead to a reduction in the effort of young individuals to educate themselves and contribute through their work to the well-being of the entire society.

== See also ==
- Capital accumulation
- Citizen's dividend
- Grant (money)
- Job guarantee
- Living wage
- Participation income
- Reduction of hours of work
- Social dividend
- Social safety net
- Subsidy
- Universal basic income
- Wage subsidy
- Workfare
