= Social risk management =

Social risk management (SRM) is a conceptual framework developed by the World Bank, specifically its Social Protection and Labor Sector under the leadership of Robert Holzmann, since the end 1990s. The objective of SRM is to extend the traditional framework of social protection to include prevention, mitigation, and coping strategies to protect basic livelihoods and promote risk taking. SRM focuses specifically on the poor, who are the most vulnerable to risk and more likely to suffer in the face of economic shocks. Through its strategies SRM aims to reduce the vulnerability of the poor and encourage them to participate in riskier but higher-return activities in order to transition out of chronic poverty.

== Motivations ==
Social protection has been a part of OECD economies for a long time but it has not played much of a role in development work because the imitation of these measures in developing countries is criticized based on equity and efficiency trade-off arguments. This view changed as a result of the following policy, conceptual and institutional triggers that led to the creation of SRM as a new social protection framework:

- The East Asian economic crisis in 1997 revealed the volatility of high growth rates in the face of negative economic shocks. Moreover, informal social safety net arrangements and public support programs were shown to be inadequate under those circumstances.
- Globalization has led to higher income variability, which together with marginalization and social exclusion leaves major groups like women and ethnic minorities highly vulnerable. Also, higher mobility of factors of production has reduced government ability to raise revenue, pursue independent economic policies, and to have national policies to help the poor when they need them the most.
- Fulfillment of World Bank's mission to reduce poverty requires a deeper "understanding of the nature and characteristics of poverty" itself. Research in this area exposed the long-term negative consequences of seemingly transitory shocks and suggested the need for a preventative view of poverty based on vulnerability.
- World Development Report 2000/01 presented social protection as a key element in attacking global poverty.
- World Bank's Social Protection and Labor Sector is one of its youngest units established in 1996. Analysis of past experiences in this area for a future policy proposal in the sector's strategy paper revealed the need for a new framework of social protection that shifted its focus from instruments to objectives

== Source of social risks ==
There are three important categories that aid in the classification of sources of risks:

1. Catastrophic vs. non-catastrophic shocks: Some events occur with low frequency, but have severe income effects like old-age, death in the family, and disabling accidents or illnesses, permanent unemployment, and the technological redundancy of skills. These catastrophic events can hit households hard and may require a continuing flow of transfers to the affected household if it cannot acquire sufficient assets. On the other end of the scale are high frequency events with non-severe income effects like transient illness, crop loss, and temporary unemployment. Protection against these non-catastrophic events need not require long-term net transfers to the afflicted household. If appropriate mechanisms are available, households may use savings or loans with no net transfers from others over time.
2. Idiosyncratic shocks vs. covariant shocks: Some sources lead to losses in only some households in a community like noncommunicative illness or frictional unemployment whereas others hit all households at the same time like drought, inflation or financial crisis. The former are known as idiosyncratic (or micro) shocks while the latter are referred to as covariant (or macro) shocks. Many more mechanisms are available for coping with idiosyncratic shocks than covariant shocks. The latter can be particularly devastating, leaving households with nowhere in the community to turn for relief. For poor and isolated households even idiosyncratic shocks might be difficult to cope with.
3. Single vs. Repeated shocks: A third distinction concerns shocks following one another like drought followed by sickness and death versus shocks that occur as single events. The former are known as repeated shocks and are typically difficult to handle through informal means.

The following table lists social risks and their degree of variance varying from idiosyncratic (micro), regional covariant (meso), to nationwide covariant (macro).

Main Sources of Risks (adapted from Holzmann and Jorgensen, 2000)
	Micro (idiosyncratic)	Meso <-------->	Macro (covariate)
Natural		Rainfall; Landslides; Volcanic eruption	Earthquakes; Floods; Drought; Tornadoes; Asteroid impacts
Health	Illness; Injury; Disability; Food poisoning	Pandemics; Food poisoning	Pandemics
Life-cycle	Birth; Old age Death		
Social	Crimes; Domestic violences Drug addiction	Terrorism; Gangs	Civil strife War; Social upheaval Drug addiction Child abuses
Economic	Unemployment; Harvest failure	Unemployment; Harvest failure Resettlement	Blue chip company collapsing Financial or currency crisis Market trading shocks
Administrative and Political	Ethnic discrimination	Ethnic conflict Riots; Chemical and biological mass destruction Administrative induced accidents and disasters	Political induced malfunction on social programs Coup
Environmental		Pollution; Deforestation; Nuclear disasters Soil salinities Acid rains	Global warming

== Strategies ==
Risk management strategies fall in three broad categories.:

=== Prevention strategies ===
These are introduced before a risk occurs to reduce the probability of a down-side risk. Reducing the probability of an adverse risk increases people's expected income and reduces income variance. Both effects increase welfare. Strategies to prevent or reduce the occurrence of income risks have a very broad range varying from small-scale informal arrangements to national economic policies. Examples include:

- Avoiding risky crop production
- Migration when current residence region is exposed to high vulnerability
- Engaging in hygiene and other disease prevention activities
- Skill training to reduce the risk of unemployment and underemployment
- Increasing financial market literacy
- Optimizing macroeconomic policies to reduce the shocks of financial crisis, such as oil price surges or unpredictable market moves on currencies, indices and blue-chip stocks.
- Improving labor standards to meet international standards including child labor reduction interventions
- Putting disability policies in place to prevent further disadvantaging the disabled population
- Prevention of pandemic illnesses by implementing vaccination and educational public health programs
- Establishing community-based insurance schemes to compensate pensioners
- Building nursing homes for the elderly and setting up public housing for the homeless and orphans.

=== Mitigation strategies ===
Mitigation strategies are also employed before the risk occurs to decrease the potential impact of a future down-side risk. Whereas preventive strategies reduce the probability of the risk occurring, mitigation strategies reduce the potential impact if the risk were to occur. Risk mitigation can take several forms:

- Portfolio diversification to reduce the variability of income by relying on a variety of assets that are not correlated strongly enough to have the same returns.
- Formal as well as informal insurance policies. While formal insurance benefits from a large pool of participants, informal insurance has the advantage of low information asymmetry. The characteristics of formal insurance are straightforward while informal insurance arrangements are more difficult to describe as they come in different and often disguised forms.
- Hedging losses using financial instruments like stocks, exchange-traded funds, insurance, forward contracts, swaps, options, many types of over-the-counter and derivative products, and futures contracts.
- Microfinance
- Pension systems
- Access to financial markets for the poor
- Community arrangements that allow for shared tenancy and small-scale pension plans
- Mandatory insurance for unemployment, old age, disability, sickness, etc.

=== Coping strategies ===
Coping strategies are designed to relieve the impact of the risk once it has occurred. The government has an important role in assisting people in coping, for example, in the case where individual households have not saved enough to handle repeated or catastrophic risks. Individuals may have been poor for their entire lifetime with no possibility to accumulate assets at all, being rendered destitute by the smallest income loss and running the risk of being faced with irreversible damages. The main forms of coping consist of:

- Individual borrowing from community members and banks
- Seasonal or temporary migration
- Selling labor including sending children to work
- Reduction of food intake
- Reliance on public, private and intra-community transfers.
- Dissaving of human capital
- Seasonal/temporary migration
- Selling of financial assets
- Disaster relief
- Social assistance in the form of asset and cash transfers
- Subsidies
- Public work projects
- Government relief fund or publicly raised money.
- Setting up unemployment benefit schemes.

== Feasibility study: Togo ==
In coordination with national governments of Togo and Yemen, World Bank conducted two feasibility studies of the social risk management framework.

Within the Africa Region, Togo was selected as a pilot country to test this approach. The process of application was launched with a workshop in Lomé for key stakeholders from the government and civil society in November 1998. During the workshop, available data was analyzed to determine sources of risks, available arrangements of social protection and vulnerable groups in Togo. Since Togo's independence in 1960, the government has provided social security for the privileged minority working in the formal sector and social assistance to a few people or groups conventionally identified as vulnerable (widows, orphans, handicapped). This leaves 95% of the Togolese to rely mostly on informal arrangements through both internal arrangements, which are organized by the prospective beneficiaries and external arrangements, which are organized by agents generally not belonging to the community.

In order to improve social protection, the government rethought its social protection policy in the framework of SRM and the following prevention, mitigation and coping strategies were proposed:

- Conducting information and education campaigns focused on key preventive measures, especially for health and environment.
- Revising family laws and land tenure laws.
- Improving the collaboration between government and communities for better access to basic social services.
- Supporting risk pooling and creative initiatives for economic shocks and chronic risks.
- Discouraging widowhood rituals, harmful traditional practices and conspicuous consumption.
- Filling the gaps of informal arrangements.
- Reforming social security in the formal sector.
- Discouraging the exploitation of child labor and trafficking.
- Organizing a more efficient mechanism to provide assistance for disaster relief

== Criticisms ==
There is a lack of empirical evidence of SRM's practical application. Besides Yemen and Togo, SRM has not been experimentally studied within the development field. This raises skepticism regarding the framework's feasibility in the arena of international development.

SRM is sometimes also viewed as a neo-liberal framework that limits the government's role to coping strategies that spring into action only in the case of market failure.

Its aim to encourage riskier activities that reap higher returns has also come under fire in light of individual risk-taking behaviors that are determined by a multitude of factors and not just decreased risk vulnerability. Also, riskier behaviors not only hold the potential for higher returns but also for bigger losses making World Bank's encouragement of such activities inappropriate.

Lack of risk monitoring and reviewing to maintain an updated inventory of contextually appropriate risks and strategies is another serious deficit of the SRM framework (fallacy of composition).

== Future implications ==
World Bank's Social Protection and Labor Sector is under the process of formulating its Social Protection and Labor Strategy 2012 – 2022. Conceptual note for the strategy outlines four indicative strategic directions:

- Expanding from improving individual programs to building social protection systems
- Strengthening the focus on low income and fragile states
- Emphasizing promotion of opportunities and livelihoods as a core element of the practice
- Continuing to build on core strengths in knowledge, innovation and results.

The upcoming Strategy is also aimed at dealing with SRM's operational issues exhibited by lack of sufficient guidance to design and implement effective social protection systems.

== See also ==
- Emergency management
- Behavioral risk management
- International Monetary Fund
- Microcredit
- Risk management
- Social floor
- Welfare culture
