= Universal =

Universal is the adjective for universe.

Universal may also refer to:

== Companies ==
- NBCUniversal, a media and entertainment company that is a subsidiary of Comcast
  - Universal Animation Studios, an American Animation studio, and a subsidiary of NBCUniversal
  - Universal TV, a television channel owned by NBCUniversal
  - Universal Kids, an American former television channel, formerly known as Sprout, owned by NBCUniversal
  - Universal Pictures, an American film studio, and a subsidiary of NBCUniversal
  - Universal Television, a television division owned by NBCUniversal Content Studios
  - Universal Destinations & Experiences, the theme park unit of NBCUniversal
  - Universal Filmed Entertainment Group, American media and entertainment unit of NBCUniversal
- Universal Airlines (disambiguation)
- Universal Avionics, a manufacturer of flight control components
- Universal Corporation, an American tobacco company
- Universal Display Corporation, a manufacturer of displays
- Universal Edition, a classical music publishing firm, founded in Vienna in 1901
- Universal Entertainment, a Japanese software producer and video game producer
- Universal Genève, a Swiss watch company
- Universal Gym Equipment
- Universal Helicopters, a commercial helicopter company
- Universal Magazines, an Australian publisher of magazines and websites
- Universal Music Group, a family of record labels
  - Universal Music India
  - Universal Records (defunct record label), a record label owned by UMG, founded in 1995
- Universal Recording Corporation, a Chicago recording studio founded in 1946
- Universal Records (Philippines), a record label in the Philippines, founded in 1977
- Universal Robina, a food and beverage company in the Philippines
- Universal Stereo, a radio station
- Universal Television (Somalia), a Somali television station
- Universal Uclick, an American content syndicate (formed in 2009 merger of Universal Press Syndicate and Uclick)
- Universal Weather and Aviation, an aviation products and services company

== Music ==
=== Groups ===
- Universal (group), a 1990s Australian boy band

=== Albums ===
- Universal (Borknagar album)
- Universal (Orchestral Manoeuvres in the Dark album), 1996
- Universal (Troll album)
- Universal (U.K. Subs album), 2002
- Universal (YFriday album), 2006
- Universal, a 1993 album by K-Klass

=== Songs ===
- "The Universal", a 1995 song by Blur
- "The Universal" (Small Faces song), 1968
- "Universal" (Orchestral Manoeuvres in the Dark song), 1996

== Cultural, religious, and philosophical concepts ==
- Universal (metaphysics)
- Universality (philosophy)
- Universalizability
- Christian universalism
- Cultural universal, a trait common to all cultures
- History of Christian universalism
- International Council of Unitarians and Universalists
- Linguistic universal, a statement that applies to all languages
- Moral universalism
- Primitive Baptist Universalist
- Trinitarian universalism, a variant of belief in universal salvation, the belief that every person will be saved, that also held the Christian belief in Trinitarianism
- Universalism and the Latter Day Saint movement
- Universalist Church of America
- Unitarian Universalism, a liberal religion characterized by a "free and responsible search for truth and meaning"
- Universal value

== Technology and devices ==
- HTC Universal, a Pocket PC phone
- The "Universal", an oxygen rebreather designed for use with the Sladen Suit
- Universal slitter, a slitter rewinder for roll slitting

== Other uses ==
- Universal (act), a type of official or legal proclamation
- Universal access to education
- Universal basic income
- Universal basic services
- Universal design
- Universal health care
- Universal inheritance
- Universal property, a property of some existence problems in category theory
- Universal suffrage
- Universal, Indiana, a small town in the United States
- Universal (Esperantido), a constructed language
- Universal, a Russian nickname for a station wagon car
- U rating (disambiguation), "Universal" media content rating
- Universal usability
- TV Universal, a Brazilian television channel

== See also ==
- El Universal (disambiguation)
- Universal City (disambiguation)
- Universalism (disambiguation)
- Universality (disambiguation)
- Universals (disambiguation)
- Universalis (disambiguation)
- Universe (disambiguation)
- Global (disambiguation)
- Worldwide (disambiguation)
