= Global =

Global may refer to:

== General ==
- Globe, a spherical model of celestial bodies
- Earth, the third planet from the Sun

== Entertainment ==
- Global (Paul van Dyk album), 2003
- Global (Bunji Garlin album), 2007
- Global (Humanoid album), 1989
- Global (Todd Rundgren album), 2015
- Bruno J. Global, a character in the anime series The Super Dimension Fortress Marcoss

== Companies and brands ==
=== Television ===
- Global Television Network, in Canada
  - Canwest Global, former parent company of Global Television Network
  - Global BC, on-air brand of CHAN-TV, a television station in Vancouver, British Columbia, Canada
  - Global Calgary
  - Global Edmonton
  - Global Halifax
  - Global Montreal
  - Global News, the news division of the Global Television Network
  - Global Okanagan, on-air brand of CHBC-TV, a television station in Kelowna, British Columbia, Canada
  - Global Toronto, a television station in Toronto
- Global TV (Venezuela), a regional channel in Venezuela
- Global TV, the former name of GTV, a television network in Indonesia
- Kanal Global, a defunct Swedish television channel

=== Other industries ===
- Global (cutlery), a Japanese brand
- Global Aviation Holdings, the parent company of World Airways, Inc., and North American Airlines, Inc., headquartered in Peachtree City, Georgia
- Bombardier Global, a series of bizjets
- Global Media & Entertainment, Media and Entertainment Group in the UK
- Global Industrial, an industrial products and office supplies company in the United States
- Global Records, a Romanian record label
- Global Bio-Chem, a listed biotechnology company in Hong Kong, with Changchun Dacheng Industry Group as its parent company
- Global Difusion, a Portuguese media company
- Global Van Lines, an international moving company

== Other uses ==
- .global, top-level domain
- Global (TV series), a British TV news programme from BBC
- Global Cebu F.C., a professional Filipino association football club
- Global Affairs Canada, the department in the Government of Canada that manages Canada's diplomatic and consular relations
- Global Agenda, an online team-based game by Hi-Rez Studios
- Global Challenge, a round the world yacht race run by Challenge Business
- Global variable, a variable with global scope

== See also ==
- Global Air (disambiguation)
- Global Vision (disambiguation)
- Globalism, now most commonly used to refer to different ideologies of globalization
- Globalization, ongoing process by which regional economies, societies, and cultures have become integrated
- Globe (disambiguation)
- Intercontinental (disambiguation)
- Worldwide (disambiguation)
- Universal (disambiguation)
