= Social security system in Russia =

The social security system in Russia incorporates various forms of government support intended to provide adequate standard of living and improve the quality of life of the particular categories of citizens, including those from vulnerable groups. Such support include both social insurance programs (i.g., pensions) and social assistance programs (i.g., social benefits), and can be tangible (i.g., money, things, services) and intangible (i.g., psychological assistance).

Russian legislation uses the expression "social services", instead of social security. Legislative definition is provided in article 3 of the Russian Federal Law No. 442-FZ "On the Basics of Social Services for Citizens in the Russian Federation": "social security is an activity aimed at the provision of social services to citizens".

== History of social security system in Russia ==
The social security system in Russia has a long history that is highly influenced by events happened in different periods of Russian history. The evolution of this system began with the Christianization of Kievan Rus'.

=== Ancient Rus' ===
After the Christianization of Kievan Rus' in 988, the traditional paradigm of social care began to change. Before 996, care about elderly, ill and fragile members of society was the responsibility of community and family members. In 996, Vladimir the Great has issued a Charter (law), which entrusted social care and public charity to the supervision of the Orthodox Church. According to The Russian Primary Chronicle, Vladimir the Great also created almshouses, hospice houses and frequently gave food to the poor.

==== Yaroslav the Wise and Vladimir II Monomakh ====
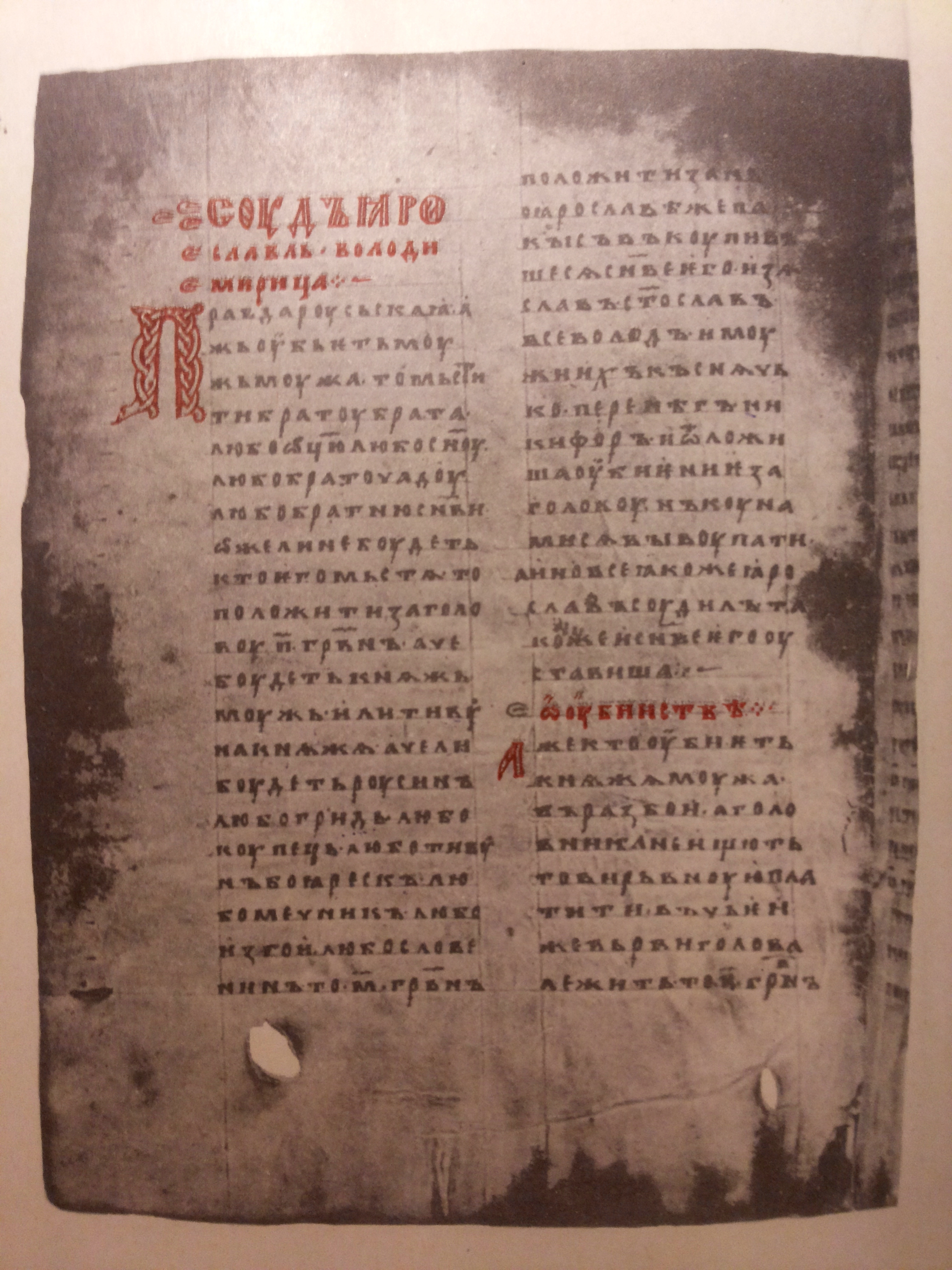
A page from Russkaya Pravda

The Russkaya Pravda was a main source of Old Russian Law and regulated, among other things, relations between different social groups and social care. It established the first legally codified social assistance. In fact, 8 of 37 articles in Russkaya Pravda were devoted to child protection, including the issues with inheritance, and orphanhood.

Vladimir II Monomakh also paid significant attention to the care of poor, ill, and fragile members of society. In Grand Prince Vladimir Monomakh's Instruction to His Children written in the 12th century, he emphasized:

"Above all else, don't forget the poor, but support them to the extent of your power. Give to the orphan, protect the widow, and don't let the mighty destroy another person."

— Vladimir II Monomakh

=== Imperial Russia ===
==== 16th—18th centuries ====
During the period of 16th-18th centuries, the social protection system significantly expanded. The main focus of social care system in this period was on the issues of beggars and poverty.

Ivan the Terrible issued the Decree on Alms aimed at identifying 'the elderly and sick' in all cities and building alms houses for them. Later, under the reign of Fyodor III of Russia in 1682, two hospitals were built in Moscow for the treatment of beggars and the poor.

Peter the Great significantly expanded the social security system in Russian Empire, ordering to start mass building of social care facilities, such as hospitals, almshouses, orphanages, houses for the care of illegitimate babies. At the same time, Peter the Great forbade giving alms directly to beggars, and by the Decree of 3 May 1720, he established a social assistance for retired soldiers ('invalid'), ordering to provide them with pensions and residence in monasteries and almshouses.

Catherine the Great changed the social security system once more by establishing in 1755 a state system of public charity for all social estates. Public charity institutions such as public schools, orphanages, hospitals, pharmacies, and workhouses were created in each province. These institutions were managed by the Public Charity Offices of each province. The funding of these institutions was regulated by the Charter on the Rights and Benefits for the Towns of the Russian Empire issued on 21 April 1785. Cities were required to deduct part of their income to Public Charity Offices. Catherine the Great also established the first nursing home in Russia for the care of wounded, sick and elderly soldiers and their families.

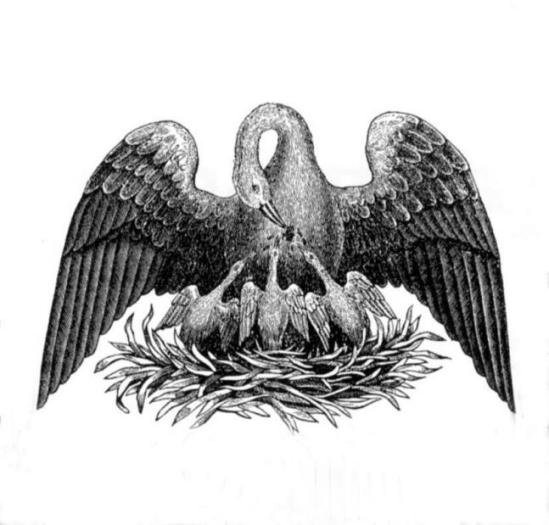
The emblem of the Office of the Institutions of Empress Maria

==== 19th—20th centuries ====
The work of the Office of the Institutions of Empress Maria began in 1796, when Empress Maria Feodorovna took the Smolny Institute of Noble Maidens under her patronage. On 2 May 1797, the Empress united her management of the Moscow Orphanage with that of the orphanage and the Foundling Hospital of St. Petersburg. The institutions managed orphanages, care of the disabled, the blind and the deaf, education for women and children, poor houses and hospitals, as well as many other institutions founded by the Empress.

Two days after the death of the Empress, Nicholas I of Russia, by decree of 26 October 1828, took all the institutions under her jurisdiction under his patronage. To manage them, the IV department of His Imperial Majesty's Own Chancellery was formed. During 1898, more than 7 million people used the services of the Office, more than 20 million people asked for one-time charitable assistance, and about 500 thousand people permanently lived in charitable institutions. The office was abolished in 1917, the year when the Russian Empire ended.

=== Soviet Union ===
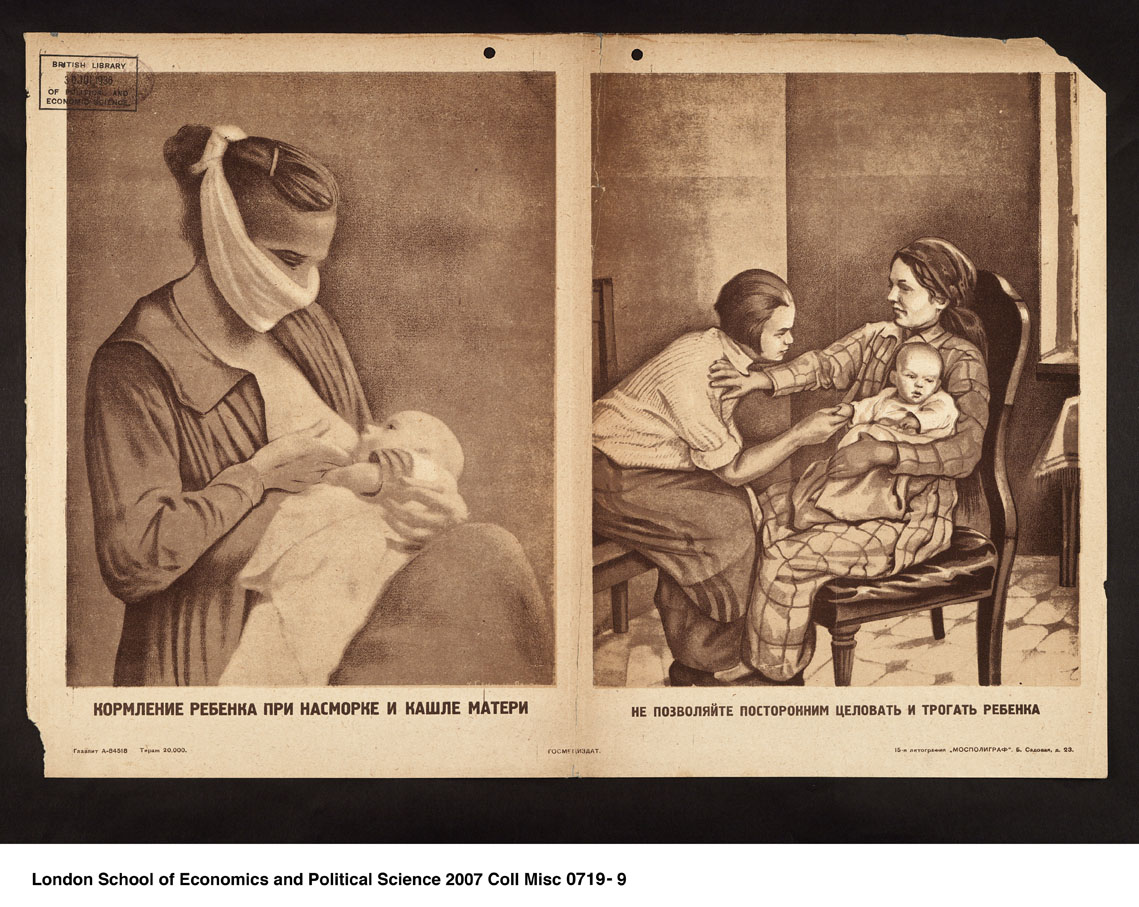
Soviet educational posters for mothers teaching how to feed a child when the mother has a cough and cold and not to allow strangers to kiss or touch a child, 1930

The development of the social security system in the Soviet Union state included several stages that correspond to crucial historical events in the Soviet Union history, such as the October Revolution of 1917, the Great Patriotic War, and the Perestroika.

==== The first stage: after the October Revolution of 1917 ====
With the October Revolution of 1917 begins the formation of a modern social security system in Russia. The main goal of the newly-formed State in the first years of its existence was to overcome the economic and social consequences of the October Revolution and Russian Civil War. The first attempts to codify the social security system in the legislation included establishment of social insurance for workers, social benefits for disabled soldiers and their family members, as well as opening of nursing homes, psycho-neurological dispensaries, boarding homes, specialized orphanages. At the same time, the State began to create a health care system for workers, including health and safety insurance at work.

During the period of the New Economic Policy (NEP), the social security system was modernised in order to meet the requirements of the new economic conditions. From the beginning of 1922, the provision of social security benefits was based mainly on the ability to perform work duties. Social protection was provided to workers disabled as a result of a work injury. The State established pensions for the loss of a breadwinner for workers' families, financial support in case of temporary disability. The State also established maternity support. Women with small children were granted the right to have breastfeeding breaks from work and financial support for childbirth and childcare. Health care system was improved by the development of sanatorium system for workers and children. Vocational training schools opened for disabled people.

This stage ended in 1936 with the adoption of the 1936 Constitution of the Soviet Union. Article 120 of the Constitution secured the right of soviet citizens to financial benefits due to old age, illness, and disability. Starting in 1937, the healthcare system was also fully funded by the state.

==== The second stage: after the "Great Patriotic War" ====
Similarly to the situation after the October Revolution, the primary goal of the government after World War 2 (known in Russia as the "Great Patriotic War") was to overcome the social and economic consequences of the war. Therefore, the formation of new social security this time centered on social care and benefits for injured and retired soldiers and their families and around their most effective integration into the rebuilding process of the economy. The government started to open special colleges, boarding schools, and other institutions aimed at helping returned soldiers, who often became disabled during the war, get an education and jobs. In 1947, the first guide dogs were trained for war veterans. Later in 1960, the first and only guide dog school in the USSR opened.

By the mid-60s, the need to unify the legislation on social security, including laws on pensions, social insurance, and social benefits arose. In the 70s and 80s, the government adopted a number of regulations aimed at improving social security. These legislative acts provided additional social benefits for disabled people such as free use of public transport and increased the amount of money spent on children's meals in kindergartens and orphanages. In addition, the minimum pension rates for workers, employees, and members of collective farms increased as well as a new system of pension calculation was developed.

On October 7, 1977, the new Constitution of the USSR was adopted. The Constitution affirmed the equality of rights of women and men (article 35), the right to health (article 42), maternity and family support (articles 43 and 53), and consolidated the legislative base for the USSR social security system.

==== The third stage: from Perestroika until the present times ====
During this period, the ideological principles of social security changed in accordance with the rapid transformation of the economy. The social security system during Perestroika was aimed at solving the problems that existed earlier in the Soviet society, but were not addressed properly by the legislation. The legislative base was expanded and modernized to provide more clear definitions and grounds for different types of social assistance. Starting from the mid 1980s, third sector organizations were incorporated into the social security system as social services providers. Thus, at the time of the dissolution of the USSR, all the main types of social assistance were well developed.

The social security system in a newly formed Russian Federation after 1991 was based on the USSR social security system both in terms of social assistance forms and in terms of legislation, at the same time taking into account new economic and social conditions in the country. The decentralization of the social security system began with the formation of a three-tier government (federal government, regional government, and local self-government). For the first time, the right of citizens to social pensions was codified in law. The pension calculation system changed and special conditions for pension appointment for certain categories of employees, such as military personnel, were established by a separate law, as well as financial benefits for the families of deceased servicemen. In the employment law, unemployment benefits were codified in the legislation.

The 1993 Constitution of the Russian Federation declared the Russian Federation a social state (article 3) and proclaimed the duty of the State to ensure the social protection of its citizens (article 39). The 2020 amendments to article 75 of the Constitution of Russia declared provision of pensions for citizens on the basis of the principles of universality, fairness, and solidarity of generations, the compulsory social insurance, and indexation of social benefits and pensions on a yearly basis.

== See also ==
- Social welfare
- Social work
- Social policy
- Human rights in Russia
- Law of the Russian Federation
- History of Russia (1991–present)

== Bibliography ==
- Dixon, John; Macarov, David (1992). Social Welfare in Socialist Countries. Abingdon: Routledge. ISBN 9781138947146.
- Firsov, Mikhail V.; Karpunina, Anastasia V.; Chernikova, Anna A.; Dontsov, Dmitriy A.; Dontsova, Margarita V.; Senkevich, Liudmila V. (2021). "Social work in Russia in the context of paradigm changes". Laplage em Revista. 7 (3B): 381–388. doi:10.24115/S2446-6220202173B1563p.381-388. ISSN 2446-6220. S2CID 244170318.
- Galaganov, V. P. (2014). Pravovoye sotsialnoye soprovozhdeniye: uchebnik dlya stud. uchrezhdeniya sred. prof. obrazovaniya (in Russian). Moscow: Izdatelskiy tsentr «Akademiya». ISBN 978-5-4468-2568-4.
- Kuzmin, K.V. (2005). Sutyrin, B. A. (ed.). Istorii︠a︡ sot︠s︡ialʹnoĭ raboty za rubezhom i v Rossii : s drevnosti i do nachala XX veka (in Russian). Moscow: Triksta. ISBN 5-902358-38-8.
- Lindenmeyr, Adele (1996). Poverty is not a vice : charity, society, and the state in imperial Russia. Princeton, NJ: Princeton University Press. ISBN 0-691-04489-9.
- Mozgovaya, I. E. (2020). Teoreticheskiye osnovy sotsialnoy raboty (in Russian). Berlin: Direct Media. ISBN 978-5-4499-1489-7.
- Holostova, Evdokiya (2012). Sotsialnaya rabota (in Russian). Moscow: Dashkov&Co. ISBN 978-5394019043.
- Holostova, Evdokiya (2016). Sistema sot︠s︡ialʹnogo obsluzhivanii︠a︡ naselenii︠a︡ : istoricheskiĭ ėkskurs i sovremennyĭ vzgli︠a︡d (in Russian). Moscow: Dashkov&Co. ISBN 978-5-394-02624-9.
- Zakharov, M. L. (2004). Pravo sot︠s︡ialʹnogo obespechenii︠a︡ Rossii : uchebnik. Ė. G. Tuchkova (3. izd., perer. i dop ed.) (in Russian). Moscow: Volters Kluver. ISBN 5-466-00004-3.
