= Universalism (disambiguation) =

Universalism refers to religious, theological, and philosophical concepts with universal application or applicability. Universalists may emphasise the universal principles of most religions.

Universalism may also refer to:

== Music ==
- "Universal Religion", a compilation album series within the Armin van Buuren discography

== Religion ==
- Unitarian Universalism
- Universalism, a theological and philosophical concept that some ideas have universal application or applicability
- Universism, a religion created by Vidkun Quisling
- Christian universalism is a school of Christian theology which includes the belief in the doctrine of universal reconciliation.
  - History of Christian universalism is the doctrine that all sinful and alienated human souls will ultimately be reconciled to God.
  - List of Christian universalists
  - Trinitarian universalism is a variant of belief in universal reconciliation, the belief that every person will be saved, that also held the Christian belief in Trinitarianism.
- An American denomination that merged into Unitarian Universalism

== Philosophy ==
- Universality (philosophy)
- Moral universalism
- Open individualism, referred to as "universalism" by American philosopher Arnold Zuboff
- Universalizability, philosophy of Kant

== Politics ==
- Universal basic income
- Universal basic services
- Universal health care
- Universal inheritance
- Universal monarchy
- Universal suffrage
- A name used by the Dark Enlightenment for secular humanism and progressivism

== Society ==
- Universal usability

== See also ==
- Universal design
- Universal (disambiguation)
- Universality (disambiguation)
- Universal church (disambiguation)
