= Social pension =

Regular cash transfer to older people

According to the International Labour Organization, social security is a human right that aims at reducing and preventing poverty and vulnerability throughout the life cycle of individuals. Social security includes different kinds of benefits (maternity, unemployment, disability, sickness, old age, etc.) A social pension is a stream of payments from the state to an individual that starts when someone retires and continues to be paid until death. This type of pension represents the non-contributory part of the pension system, the other being the contributory pension, as per the most common form of composition of these systems in most developed countries.

== History ==
The need for a social pension dates back to the Industrial Revolution, when the new economic system boosted the mobility of workers, but loosened ties between family members, whose solidarity was protecting people from personal economic deprivation. This, along with impractical voluntary thrift and insurance, resulted in many workers retiring without any source of income.

The first attempt at cash transfers to the elderly population was seen at the end of the 19th century. One of the first countries that introduced a social pension was Germany in 1889, when Chancellor Otto von Bismarck enacted a policy to connect ordinary workers in the newly created German state and granted every worker who reached the age of 65 a small flat pension. At first it was funded by taxes on the tobacco monopoly.

In the 1890s Denmark (1891) and New Zealand (1898) adopted social pensions, and were followed in the early 20th century by Australia (1908) and Sweden (1913), along with many other countries. Throughout the 20th century, most countries were deciding between two paths based on the strategy of the system – a minimum pension for the elderly or securing income maintenance either by taxed subsidized voluntary pension and compulsory income-related pension. This resulted in convergence to a dual system where both of those strategies were included.

Today, more than 100 countries provide social pension to their citizens in various forms and on average OECD countries spend 7 – 8 per cent of their GDP on pensions for elderly care.

== Reasons ==
The reasons for implementing a social pension and government involvement include issues that arise when individuals voluntarily save insufficient funds for retirement or when market failures create societal inequalities. Common social pensions worldwide include orphan's pensions, which protect minors who have lost parents and are too young to work, and widow's pensions, which support non-working spouses without the skills or qualifications for the mainstream job market. Another factor might be individuals' shortsightedness, leading to inadequate savings or additional income for retirement. This may also relate to an information gap, where individuals cannot accurately evaluate the financial stability of savings and insurance companies or the effectiveness of investment programs. Additionally, insurance market failures, such as moral hazard or adverse selection, can prevent the availability of insurance against risks like longevity or disability.

== The Five Pillars ==
The concept of the five pillars in pension systems, as defined by the World Bank, refers to a framework that outlines different design elements to determine pension system modalities and reform options. This framework emphasizes the importance of incorporating multiple pillars in pension system design to enhance effectiveness, efficiency, and sustainability in providing retirement income.

The concept of the five pillars emerged from the World Bank's experience in supporting pension reforms and addressing the evolving needs and conditions in client countries. These pillars are the following:

1. Zero Pillar: The non-contributory zero pillar is typically a form of social assistance, such as a demogrant or social pension, financed by the government. It explicitly aims to alleviate poverty among the elderly by providing a minimal level of protection to all individuals in old age. This pillar is designed to ensure basic protection for those with low lifetime incomes, including individuals who have limited participation in the formal economy.
2. First Pillar: The mandatory first pillar involves contributions linked to earnings with the goal of replacing a portion of an individual's pre-retirement income. It addresses risks such as individual myopia, low earnings, and uncertainty in financial planning due to factors like life expectancies and market risks. Typically financed on a pay-as-you-go basis, subject to demographic and political risks.
3. Second Pillar: The mandatory second pillar consists of individual savings accounts, known as defined contribution plans, with various design options. Establishes a clear link between contributions, investment performance, and benefits, supporting enforceable property rights and financial market development. Participants may face financial and agency risks due to private asset management, transaction costs, and longevity risks.
4. Third Pillar: The voluntary third pillar encompasses diverse forms of individual or employer-sponsored savings for retirement, offering flexibility and discretion. Provides additional avenues for retirement savings beyond mandatory pillars, catering to the needs of different income groups.
5. Fourth Pillar: The fourth pillar includes non-financial elements such as informal support (e.g., family assistance), other social programs (e.g., healthcare, housing), and individual assets (e.g., home ownership, reverse mortgages).Offers supplementary support and diversification for retirement income, addressing the needs of various population segments.

According to the World Bank, by incorporating these pillars in pension system design, countries can create a more comprehensive and resilient framework to meet the diverse needs of their populations.

== Financing ==
Financing the social pension is a part of national, fiscal, and public finance policies and therefore is linked to the general government budget. Generally, the social pension schemes as a part of the first pillar of pension systems use the pay-as-you-go scheme (PAYG), which collects contributions in the form of social security taxes every year in an amount which should be equal to the expected expenditures in the same year. This means that the system does not accumulate any reserves and if so, then only to avoid liquidity problems. The PAYG system is sometimes subject to demographic and political problems (e. g. aging of population).

== The impact on poverty of reducing pension benefits ==
Public transfers in Organization for Economic Cooperation and Development (OECD) countries, which include earnings-related pensions and means-tested benefits, typically constitute about 60 percent of the total income for the elderly population. For instance, coverage in voluntary funded pension plans among workers in the poorest decile averages between 10 and 20 percent, significantly lower than in higher-income deciles. Projections indicate a further decline in replacement rates between 2010 and 2060. On average, this decline is estimated to be nearly 20 percent. With an elasticity of -0.8 between the public pension replacement rate and elderly poverty, it is projected that elderly poverty would increase by approximately 0.5 percentage points (3 percent) between 2010 and 2030. One direct approach to mitigate the impact of pension reforms on old-age poverty is to reduce pension benefits only for those with higher incomes, thereby increasing the progressivity of public pension benefits. Efforts to better target these benefits to the poor could have a substantial effect on elderly poverty while also helping contain the fiscal costs. However, increasing voluntary pensions and other private savings during working lives may pose a challenge, particularly for the low-skilled and less educated due to their lower earnings and participation in voluntary pension plans.

== Categories ==
1. Universal pension (also referred to as "demogrant", "categorical pension" or "citizens pension") is a pension where the only criteria for receiving it is age and citizenship, resp. residence. Some countries are specifying these criteria further, like The Netherlands which requires 50 years of residency between ages of 15 and 65 for a full pension and discounts it for every missing year by 2 per cent. This type of pension might be taxable.
2. Universal minimum pension overlaps the universal pension. The main difference is that the purpose of this system is to grant additional financial resources to those who did not or could not secure themselves income high enough from the contributory second pillar of the pension scheme, and therefore grants them minimum base income when they retire. The voluntary third pillar is not accounted for in this case. This system was first developed in Sweden in 1913. In addition, some countries, like Norway or Finland, have introduced a "taper" which grants pensioners some additional non-contributory income, even if they already earn the minimum pension. For example, in Finland with a 50% taper, you can earn a pension double the amount of the minimum pension before you lose the right to the non-contributory benefit.
3. Recoverable social pension is a universal pension in terms of eligibility. The difference is that this pension is added to other taxable income and is subject to recovery by a surcharge.
4. Social assistance pension covers all other types of social pension. It can be further divided by its means test, based on whether it is applied only on the individual or his entire household. Since the most important test considers the total income and assets possessed by an individual or the household, there can be a huge difference between those two types. In the individual means test, only the wealth of the individual matters and therefore it can better address individual poverty issues. The household means test considers the capability of other family members to take care of their retired family members.

== Coverage across the world ==
Since 2000, the coverage of legal and effective social pension has been constantly increasing, especially in recent years. Between 2015 and 2017 more than 90% of the elderly population were receiving their benefits in 34 countries. The number of countries where the effective social pension coverage was less than 20% fell to 36. In the same period, universal social pensions were established in many developing countries in Africa (Botswana, Lesotho, Namibia and Zanzibar), Asia (East Timor), and Latin America (Bolivia). In contrast, Azerbaijan, Albania and Greece experienced a reduction in social pension coverage by 12 to 16%.

=== Czech Republic ===
The pension framework in the Czech Republic is bifurcated into two distinct segments.

The primary segment encompasses the compulsory foundational pension coverage, which operates on a defined benefit (DB) structure and is financed through a pay-as-you-go (PAYGO) system. This segment is all-encompassing, catering to every economically active citizen without any industry-specific variations, except for minor differences in administrative processes within certain public service sectors such as the military and law enforcement. The benefits from this foundational pension coverage are claimed by over 99% of individuals who surpass the stipulated retirement age.

Additionally, the Czech pension model includes an elective supplementary pension insurance bolstered by governmental contributions. This is a defined contribution (DC) scheme and is capital-funded. Within the context of the European Union, this supplementary insurance is recognized as the pension system's third pillar. It also encompasses life insurance products offered by private insurers. Despite its existence, the pensions from this third pillar currently constitute an insubstantial fraction of retirees’ income. Notably, this pillar falls under the purview of the Ministry of Finance, hence its absence from the Ministry of Labor and Social Affairs’ website. Contrary to the norm in other EU nations, the Czech pension scheme does not feature a second pillar typically associated with employer pension plans.

The core legal statute that delineates the rights to a pension from the basic pension insurance, the methodology for calculating pension benefits, and the terms of disbursement is Act No. 155/1995 Coll., on pension insurance. This act, subject to amendments, was enacted on January 1, 1996.

=== Denmark ===
The Danish social pension is a regular income paid to people who have reached retirement age by the Danish government. Those who are residents of Denmark are entitled to the social pension. The minimum age to receive the pension is determined by a person's date of birth:

| Birth Date | Retirement age |
|---|---|
| 31 December 1953 or earlier | 65 |
| 1 January 1954 – 30 June 1954 | 65.5 |
| 1 July 1954 – 31 December 1954 | 66 |
| 1 January 1955 – 30 June 1955 | 66.5 |
| 1 July 1955 – 31 December 1962 | 67 |
| 1 January 1963 – 31 December 1966 | 68 |
| 1 January 1967 or later | 69 |

A full public pension requires 40 years of residence in Denmark. As of 2024, the basic amount of the social pension is DKK 6,928 per month, however this basic amount may be reduced if it is determined than an individual makes more than DKK 348,700 per year. There is also a pension supplement of DKK 8,016 per month for single individuals, and DKK 4,102 per month for married couples.

México

The pension system in Mexico is made up of a complex institutional framework that includes seven institutions at the federal level that offer benefits under contributory and non-contributory schemes. The federal pension system in Mexico is composed of seven institutions at the federal level that provide benefits in both contributory and non-contributory schemes. These institutions include IMSS, ISSSTE, PEMEX, CFE, ISSSFAM, SHCP and BIENESTAR.

In addition, there are subsystems in states, municipalities and universities. This fragmentation results in disparate rules and requirements among the different systems, as well as unequal benefits for the population.

=== New Zealand ===
The social pension in New Zealand is called the New Zealand Superannuation. The requirements for getting the pension are that you have to be at least 65 years old, be a citizen of New Zealand, a permanent resident of New Zealand, or hold a residence-class visa. Additionally, an individual is required to have lived in New Zealand for a given time period after the age of 20, and in particular to have lived in New Zealand for at least 5 years from the age of 50 to qualify for the Superannuation pension. The exact amount of years required to have lived in New Zealand varies depending on an individual's date of birth:

| Date of birth | Required number of years lived in New Zealand to qualify |
|---|---|
| On or before June 30, 1959 | 10 years |
| 1 July 1959 - 30 June 1961 | 11 years |
| 1 July 1961 - 30 June 1963 | 12 years |
| 1 July 1963 - 30 June 1965 | 13 years |
| 1 July 1965 - 30 June 1967 | 14 years |
| 1 July 1967 - 30 June 1969 | 15 years |
| 1 July 1969 - 30 June 1971 | 16 years |
| 1 July 1971 - 30 June 1973 | 17 years |
| 1 July 1973 - 30 June 1975 | 18 years |
| 1 July 1975 - 30 June 1977 | 19 years |
| On or after 1 July 1977 | 20 years |

According to the OECD, as of 2022, the basic pension for a single (unmarried) individual was NZD 27,988.48 per year. The pension rate is adjusted each year by movement in the Consumer Price Index (CPI) as well as the average net-of-tax weekly wage.

=== Philippines ===
Social Pension Program for Indigent Senior Citizens (SPISC) is a program for funding indigent senior citizens in Philippines. The government gives them a monthly payment of five hundred pesos which are intended to be used for medical equipment and services. The program has been in place since 2011 and has since been modified several times; it currently offers assistance to senior citizens who are 60 years old and above.

=== Sweden ===
The Swedish social pension is administered by the Swedish Pensions Agency, and ensures a minimum level of pension for all residents. It covers everyone who has worked or lived in Sweden. The social pension consists of several different parts, such as the income pension, income pension complement, premium pension and guarantee pension. It serves as a safety net, guaranteeing financial support to retirees who may not have substantial private savings or occupational pension benefits. The amount of the social pension varies based on an individual's circumstances and is paid out for as long as an individual is alive. The longer a person works, the higher the person's pension payment will be as a person continues to earn towards their pension throughout their lives.

=== The Netherlands ===
The Dutch social pension is known as the AOW pension, and is available to Dutch residents. Each year an individual lives in The Netherlands they add an additional 2% to their AOW pension. A full AOW pension can be obtained by living and working in the Netherlands and contributing towards the pension for 50 years before reaching retirement age. The AOW pension amount varies depending on how much an individual has contributed towards their pension and their marital status. The pension amount is adjusted every 6 months. According to the OECD, as of 2022, the AOW pension amount for single individuals was EUR 1,344.94 per month and for couples the total amount was EUR 1,828.30 per couple. The AOW pension age depends on an individual's birth-date, with those born before 1 January 1961 having a pension age of 67 years, while those born between the 1 January 1961 and 30 September 1962 have a pension age of 67 years and 3 months, and those born after the 1 October 1962 having a currently unknown pension age.

== See also ==
- Guaranteed minimum income
- Old Age Security
- Social insurance
- Social protection floor
- Social protection
- Social safety net
- Welfare
- Welfare culture
- Welfare state
