= Globle =

Globle may refer to:

- Globle (game), a Wordle-like country-identification game
- A common misspelling of Global
