= Universal probability (disambiguation) =

The universal probability is the algorithmic probability of a universal prefix-free Turing machine, used to define a universal prior distribution.

Universal probability may also refer to:

- Universality probability, the probability that a universal Turing machine remains universal even when every input of it is prefixed by a random binary string.
- Universal probability bound, a notion used by proponents of the pseudoscientific theory of intelligent design.

== See also ==
- Universality
