= Versal =

Versal may refer to:

- Versal, a choice of case in text; see Capitalization
- Versal, embellished initials or even historiated initials such as found in an illuminated manuscript
- Versal, a Xilinx computing architecture

== See also ==
- Universal (disambiguation)
