= Global Vision =

Global Vision can refer to:

- Global Vision (UK), a British campaign group
- Global Vision (Canada)
- GlobalVision
