= Universal CityWalk (disambiguation) =

Universal CityWalk is the entertainment complex division of Universal Destinations & Experiences.

Universal CityWalk may also refer to:

- Universal CityWalk Orlando at Universal Orlando Resort
- Universal CityWalk Hollywood, adjacent to Universal Studios Hollywood
- Universal CityWalk Beijing at Universal Beijing Resort
- Universal CityWalk Osaka at Universal Studios Japan

== See also ==
- Universal City
- CityWalk
