= Universalis (disambiguation) =

Universalis is a storytelling and role-playing game.

Universalis may also refer to:

- Encyclopædia Universalis, a French-language encyclopedia
- Europa Universalis (EU), a grand strategy video game
  - or one of its sequels Europa Universalis II, Europa Universalis III, Europa Universalis: Rome, Europa Universalis IV, Europa Universalis V
- UCMSA Universalis, student society of University College Maastricht, Netherlands
- Universalis is a free clone of the proprietary font Futura
- Universalis, a 2018 album by Hammock

== See also ==
- Universal (disambiguation)
