= Global Airways =

Global Airways is a name used by several airlines including:

- Global Airways (Turks and Caicos) based in the Turks and Caicos Islands
- Global Airways (GBL), aircraft lessor and charter airline based in South Africa

== See also ==
- Global Air (disambiguation)
- Global Airlines
- Global Crossing Airlines, operating as GlobalX Airlines
- Western Global Airlines
