= Social insurance =

Government-sponsored social program

Social Security Contributions in OECD countries

Adequacy of social insurance programs

Social insurance is a form of social welfare that provides insurance against economic risks. The insurance may be provided publicly or through the subsidizing of private insurance. In contrast to other forms of social assistance, individuals' claims are partly dependent on their contributions, which can be considered insurance premiums to create a common fund out of which the individuals are then paid benefits in the future.

Types of social insurance include:

- Public health insurance
- Social Security
- Public Unemployment Insurance
- Public auto insurance
- Universal parental leave

== Features ==
- The contributions of individuals are nominal and never go beyond what they can afford;
- the benefits, eligibility requirements and other aspects of the program are defined by statute;
- explicit provision is made to account for the income and expenses (often through a trust fund);
- it is funded by taxes or premiums paid by (or on behalf of) participants (but additional sources of funding may be provided as well); and
- the program serves a defined population, and participation is either compulsory or so heavily subsidized that most eligible individuals choose to participate.

Social insurance has also been defined as a program whose risks are transferred to and pooled by an often government organisation legally required to provide certain benefits.

In the United States, programs that meet these definitions include Social Security, Medicare, the Pension Benefit Guaranty Corporation program, the Railroad Retirement Board program and state-sponsored unemployment insurance programs. The Canada Pension Plan (CPP) is also a social insurance program.

The World Bank's 2019 World Development Report on The Changing Nature of Work considers the appropriateness of traditional social insurance models that are based on steady wage employment in light of persistently large informal sectors in developing countries and the decline in standard employer-employee relationships in advanced countries.

Social insurance is a public insurance that provides protection against economic risks. Participation in social insurance is compulsory. Social insurance is considered to be a type of social security.

Social insurance differs from public support in that individuals' claims are partly dependent on their contributions, which can be considered as insurance premium. If what individuals receive is proportional to their contributions, social insurance can be considered a government "production activity" rather than redistribution. Given that what some receive is far higher than what they attribute (on an actuarial basis), there is a large element of redistribution involved in government social insurance programs. The largest of these programs is Old Age, Survivors' and Disability Insurance Program (OASDI). It provides income not only for pensioners, but also to their survivors (especially widows and widowers) and people with disabilities. Other major social insurance schemes are workers' compensation, which provides compensation for workers injured at work, unemployment insurance providing temporary benefits after job loss, and Medicare. The Medicare Program, which provides medical services in old age (like Medicaid), has grown rapidly since its first introduction in 1965 and is now the second largest program. Social security and Medicare are sometimes called middle class programs because the middle class are the main beneficiaries and benefits are not provided on a need basis, but when people satisfy a certain requirement, for example age. As soon as they satisfy the criteria, they can receive benefits.

== Justifications ==
Social insurance is based on the premise that there is not always equitable distribution of resources or benefits in a competitive economy and there must be provisions to ensure that participants in the market do not end up with an "all-or-nothing-game". It is a means to allow participants of a dynamic economy to take risks and engage in economic activity with the assurance that in the instance of an emergency, they will be protected through this accumulated fund. Social insurance provides "social justice" and "social stability".

The following reasons specifically identify the features of a market economy that give rise to the need for social insurance:

=== Asymmetric information ===
This is a form of failure in a competitive market where there is not a parity in the provision of information between buyers and sellers or in this situation insurers and the insured. If the risk involved in a transaction is not made equally clear to both parties then the trades are differently valued by the two parties.

The difference in knowledge between insurers and insured about the risk level ultimately leads to the problem of adverse selection. An example of this problem would be the situation where insurers set a particular price for health insurance that is too high for individuals with low risk of getting sick, and thus only those with a high risk of getting sick purchase this insurance. Ultimately the insurance company is losing money since they cannot discriminate between buyers and thus they further increase prices. This increase continues to eliminate individuals whose risk level is not enough to pay the prices of this insurance and insurance companies enter the death spiral.

=== Redistribution ===
In order to achieve a better and more equitable distribution of insurance costs, the government intervenes through the means of taxation of low risk individuals in order to subsidise the premiums that have to be paid by high risk individuals. Therefore, there is a redistribution from low risk individuals to high risk individuals. Because of this, income taxes are often used in the efficient implementation of social insurance programs. In the case of the Affordable Care Act, for example, an individual mandate was included which required Americans to purchase health insurance or be subject to a financial penalty. This allowed higher cost individuals, from the perspective of insurance companies, such as people with pre-existing conditions to be covered and not excluded at a reasonable rate. Although causing political controversy, was an example of redistribution within a social insurance program.

=== Externalities ===
If individuals do not have social insurance and are thereby unable to afford the basic right of healthcare, then not only are they subjecting themselves to illnesses but also creating the likelihood that others around them will be infected as well. This would be an example of a negative externality. In the case of the now struck down individual mandate, everyone purchasing health insurance creates a positive externality for those that are high cost to insurance companies as they can now afford health care and cannot be discriminated upon because of various emerging or pre-existing conditions.

== Durability ==
The existence of social insurance stems from the acceptance of the ideology that workers should be insured against the risk of losses of economic status due to their participation in the labour market. This inherent idea of fairness has propagated the desirability and subsequent durability of this program.

1. Social insurance provides protection against certain risks in the economy that private insurance fails to deal with. Private insurance often becomes extremely unaffordable due to the issues of adverse selection and moral hazard, and to counteract such steep prices, the need for a publicly mandated social insurance increases.
2. Social insurance is considered fair and socially responsible because it taps into the human desire of wanting to help individuals who face risks that are not their fault and neither are they in their control.
3. The premiums required for the existence of social insurance policies come from workers who will ultimately be covered by the benefits, and this sense of accountability makes the program seem fair and its beneficiaries, deserving.
4. Social insurance helps account for the lack of predictability that individuals in the market have regarding their retirement, health and stability, and thereby insures them against long term risks that they now no longer need to think about but are, for the most part, inevitable.

== Consequences ==
=== Moral hazard ===
An issue of social insurance is that often, individuals who are insured against certain risks become complacent and more likely to take adverse actions because they are secure in the knowledge that they will be insured against the adverse outcomes of these actions. This process is known as moral hazard and is a drawback of providing insurance to everyone because then the government and insurance providers cannot monitor the insured and must bear their costs of immoral actions.

Moral hazard has important implications for optimal social insurance programs, particularly in the case of unemployment benefits: the presence of moral hazard entails that, paradoxical as it may seem, individuals should optimally be only partially insured against unemployment. This is because, in order to incentivize an unemployed worker's job search effort, it is necessary that the benefits paid to the worker during unemployment, meted out as a fraction of the worker's previous salary, are greatest when the individual is actively seeking employment.

=== Intergenerational acceptance and desirability ===
Those that critique the program of social insurance bring up the argument that programs such as social security only increase the burden on the employed youth of the country because of the number of retired individuals that are the beneficiaries.

However, this has been mitigated by research that shows that although the number of retirees that benefit from the working youth is significant, the number of children that American families are raising, have considerably fallen. Thus, the number of members in a family that need to be supported have reduced. The question of whether this is fair still remains on the youth who must decide whether this offset in payments is enough of a counteracting effect.

In 2019, receipts from Social Insurance taxes, the second-largest revenue source, increased by $72 billion (or 6 percent), and increased as a share of the economy from 5.8 percent in 2018 to 5.9 percent in 2019, climbing just above the 50-year average of 5.9 percent.

"The increase in payroll tax receipts reflects higher wages and salaries and the reallocations made between payroll and individual income taxes"

=== Labor supply effects ===
Unemployment insurance and workers' compensation are essential aspects of Social Insurance that indeed provide unparalleled assistance to citizens facing uncertainty regarding their jobs. Although these programs have obvious benefits, they also affect the labor supply because they incentivise workers to spend time out of work and thus the time that these citizens are unemployed is longer. Unemployment insurance, an example of social insurance, is inherently faced with determining whether individuals face financial hardship in the form of little or no income by choice or by circumstantial necessity. An unemployed worker is able to rejoin the work force through active, effortful job search. In the case of full unemployment insurance, and job search effort is difficult to be monitored and evaluated, the unemployed individual may have no incentive to keep searching as they receive unemployment benefits. This reveals the inherent social insurance tradeoff of the incentives of the insurance and the risk involved.

== Similarities to private insurance ==
Typical similarities between social insurance programs and private insurance programs include:

- Wide pooling of risks;
- Specific definitions of the benefits provided;
- Specific definitions of eligibility rules and the amount of coverage provided;
- Specific premium, contribution or tax rates required to meet the expected costs of the system.

== Differences from private insurance ==
Typical differences between private insurance programs and social insurance programs include:

- Private insurance programs are generally designed with greater emphasis on equity between individual purchasers of coverage, and social insurance programs generally place a greater emphasis on the social adequacy of benefits for all participants.
- Participation in private insurance programs is often voluntary; if the purchase of insurance is mandatory, individuals usually have a choice of insurers. Participation in social insurance programs is generally mandatory; if participation is voluntary, the cost is heavily subsidised enough to ensure essentially universal participation.
- The right to benefits in a private insurance program is contractual, based on an insurance contract. The insurer generally does not have a unilateral right to change or terminate coverage before the end of the contract period (except in such cases as nonpayment of premiums). Social insurance programs are not generally based on a contract but on a statute, and the right to benefits is thus statutory rather than contractual. The provisions of the program can be changed if the statute is modified.
- Individually purchased private insurance generally must be fully funded. Full funding is a desirable goal for private pension plans as well, but is often not achieved. Social insurance programs are often not fully funded, and some argue that full funding is not economically desirable. Most international systems of social insurance are funded on an ongoing basis without reference to future liabilities. That is seen as a matter of solidarity between generations and between the sick and the healthy as a part of the social contract. The current generation of healthy working people pay something now to meet the health care and living costs of those who are currently temporarily incapacitated through sickness or who have ceased work through old age or disability. The main exception is in the United States, where the two largest programs, Medicare and Social Security programs, the administrators have historically collected more in social premiums than they have paid out as social benefits. The difference is retained in a trust fund. In both programs, US government actuaries periodically attempt to predict up to 70 years in advance the longevity of the fund and must estimate the future rates of contributions and pensions, the types of health care needs of the beneficiaries, and what that might cost. No other country in the world does so. Despite the US programs being in considerable surplus, the political argument is often that these programs are "going bankrupt" or that politicians have spent the money on other things.

== Welfare ==
Welfare is a large program of social insurance that creates many externalities. With welfare, the beneficiary's contributions to the program are taken into account. A welfare program pays recipients based on need, not contributions. In the US, there are welfare-to-work programs that give unemployed people an incentive to work if they are starting to seek a job. The people who use these programs are government expenditures and are closely monitored to make sure that they are searching for a job. They will receive several benefits once they find a job including wage subsidies and tax breaks. Welfare-to-work programs like these try to give people the incentive to work because, without them, people have a strong incentive to stay unemployed.

== See also ==
- Accident insurance/Workers' compensation (United States)
- Disability insurance (United States)
- Generational accounting
- Health insurance (United States)
- Parental dividend
- Pension (United States)
- Precariat
- Retirement (United States)
- Right to health
- Social health insurance
- Social insurance number (Canada)
- Social pension
- Social policy
- Social protection
- Social protection floor
- Social safety net
- Social security
- Social security in Australia
- Social security in Sweden
- Unemployment insurance (United States)
- Universal health care
- Universal Health Coverage Day
- Welfare culture
