= Yoshida Metal Industry =

Japanese manufacturer

- Industry: manufacturing
- Founded: 1954; 72 years ago
- Headquarters: Tsubame, Japan
- Area served: Worldwide
- Key people: Chuji Kamekura
- Products: Kitchen knives, kitchenware accessories
- Number of employees: 96
- Website: www.yoshikin.co.jp/en/about-us/

Yoshida Metal Industry Co. Ltd also known as Yoshikin is a Japanese metal manufacturing company known for its production of GLOBAL knives.

== History ==
The company was founded in 1954 in the Niigata Prefecture. The company originally focused on tableware but switched its focus to high carbon stainless steel blades in 1960.

In 1985 it introduced the GLOBAL brand of knives and currently has an international presence.
