= Behavioral risk =

Behavioral risk involves the identification, analysis, and management of risk factors in industrial and organizational psychology. Its management regards the process of managing workplace risk factors pertinent to organizational behavior and industrial and organizational psychology. "Behavioral risk management applies to risks connected with the workplace behaviors of employees and organizations that have a negative impact on the productivity of an organization; behavioral healthcare episodes and the cost of treating these episodes; and lifestyle behaviors that lead to preventable healthcare conditions and the cost of treating these conditions."

Its focus lies on how behavior affects workplaces and organizations along with how to appropriately mitigate negative effects from inappropriate behavior.

== Overview ==
The management of behavioral risk encompass the study of organization and individual behavior from two primary roots: risk management and organizational behavior. With regard to its risk management roots, this type of management analyzes the effect of practices, cultures and behaviors as well as their associated risk of negative outcomes within an individual (health) and/or an organization (expenses). Alternatively, from its organization studies roots, behavioral risk management explains how organizations and their respective organizational culture, productivity and success of a firm can be associated with the given organization's behavioral aspects.

Behavioral risk is studied to "identify and prevent loss from behavioral risk factors, thereby enhancing organizational health and human capital". Ultimately, the purpose of behavioral risk management is to identify practices and patterns that prove detrimental to organizations. The main applications of this study were identified as:

- Cost savings from preventable loss
- Increased productivity and profitability by addressing human capital needs
- Enhanced strategic alignment with human resources and organizational leadership
- Measure and demonstrate successes in human capital management

== Impact ==
=== On individuals ===
Negative behavior (or "discreet emotions") within an organization can lead individuals to feel uncomfortable as well as stressed. This can often cause members to not feel compelled to work or feel like environment is not appropriate for work. Furthermore, negative behavior from an individual can also influence other individuals within the organization. For example, if person A acts in a certain way, there is high a chance that person B will adopt person's A practices through person A's influence. If these practices are negative, it becomes easier for negative behavior to spread throughout the organization, affecting all individuals.

=== On the organization ===
When a large number of individuals within the organization start to feel like they are either out of place or offended then there is a high possibility that these individuals may either leave the organization, revolt against such practices, or completely lose motivation. Despite which paradigm occurs, all scenarios result in a major loss in productivity. On a simplistic scale, negative behavior can affect the organizational culture. This is hazardous because organizations rely on their culture for a variety of uses, with their culture often being interconnected to the structure of the organization itself. If the culture of an organization begins to fall apart, the structure of the organization will shortly follow as well.

== Negative behavior ==
Negative behavior does not necessarily entail an individual acting particularly immature or rude. Negative behavior within an organization can instead be associated with certain practices or even the individual's mentality comprising the organization. If a given practice or mentality is not necessarily compatible with the specific organization, it does not make that practice or mentality necessarily wrong. The same practice could be viewed positively from another organization's perspective. In addition, negative behavior can also include theft and violence . Behavior can often be viewed as negative behavior due to several reasons.

=== Personality ===
Personality is an extremely important factor for individuals within an organization. Various studies have been conducted in order to analyze how various personality types can impact an organization. Tests in order to measure personalities have been developed. The most useful for organizations currently is the Big Five personality traits. These measure certain traits and categorize a person according to his or her personality. In addition, these are designed to accommodate to the needs and interests of organizations in general and not individuals. While many organizations may look for specific trends in the personality traits according to the culture of the organization, there is one in which all organizations agree upon that is considered as a negative sign, neuroticism. High levels of neuroticism are often viewed as an extremely negative trait. People who tend to overreact, create drama or simply fall under stress due to unexpected situations are an example of high levels of neuroticism.

=== Cultural background ===
Organizations account for the idea that when they reside in a different country or when they hire employees from different countries there is always a chance of facing different working habits, ethics, along with a number of other aspects by the individuals or society they are operating in. One very good way to look at this point is how American employees have different working ethics than Indian employees. This can often increase conflict within the organization because what one person sees as either morally correct, or the most effective method, may not be the same as the rest of the group. This can generate negative repercussions within the organization because individuals may, once again, feel uncomfortable and will also increase tension which eventually affects the structure of the organization and how effective they are at what they do.

=== Theft and violence ===
Violence and theft are perhaps the greatest causes of negative behavior in organizations. It greatly harms the productivity of the group as a whole and can often impact the health conditions of members within the organizations. In terms of theft, various researches have found that the increasingly large number of thefts within organizations, especially cyber theft, provides a number of risks to the organization, ranging from the loss money to the loss of information.

== Solution for negative behaviors ==
Various methods can be used in order to mitigate the risk of negative behavior within an organization. These can be divided to before hiring employees, and if the employees are already active within the company.

- The selection process. During the period of time where individuals are joining the organization, the organization is capable of selecting those who would match to the culture of the organization and would have personality traits that are cherished within that organization. This works as a sort of filter in order to avoid people who could potentially affect the structure of the organization.
- The creation of common ground within the individuals of the organization. This can lead to better communication and understanding between the members. This is often extremely helpful when working with those from a different cultural background.
- A strong organizational culture can also be extremely influential in mitigating the risk of negative behavior. This is because members themselves can “punish” those who act in a negative way. This can be done through pressuring them into conforming to the practices of the organization.

=== The "DO IT" method ===
American psychologist E. Scott Geller, among other researchers, have found that the best way to identify and deal with behavioral risks is through a method called the Define, Observe, Intervene, Test (DO IT) method. Each of these methods of dealing with behavioral risk has been seen to limit high risk behavior. Define stands for defining certain target behaviors. These include the negative behaviors within the work place or what could be the negative behaviors. Observe is looking out for the already defined negative behavior. In this case, you analyze workers and members in order to try to find negative points that could be potentially harmful. The Intervene stage is the one designed to increase the occurrence of safe behavior. Changing external conditions of the system can make safe behavior more likely. Once negative behavior or risk of negative behavior is identified, it is important to quickly address those issues. The final Test stage is where the group looks back the process as a whole and tries to understand whether all of the previous stages have been done successful. For example, if the intervention stage did not work well, in the test stage member would often decide a new sort of intervention. The Test phase can be seen as a sort of evaluation stage.

== See also ==
- Industrial and organizational psychology
- Psychosomatic illness
- Social risk management
