= El Universal =

El Universal may refer to the following Spanish-language publications:

- El Universal (Cartagena), a Colombian newspaper established in 1948
- El Universal (Mexico City), a Mexican newspaper established in 1916
- El Universal Ilustrado, a Mexican literary magazine published from 1917 to 1928
- El Universal (Caracas), a Venezuelan newspaper established in 1909

== See also ==
- The Herald Mexico: A joint venture between El Universal (Mexico City) and The Miami Herald from 2004 to 2007
- Universal (disambiguation)
