= Universal church =

Universal church or Universal Church may refer to:

== Religions and religious denominations ==
- Catholic Church
- Universalist Church of America
- Unitarian Universalism
- Universal Church of Truth
- Universal Church of the Kingdom of God

== Religious beliefs and doctrines ==
- Christian Church
- Catholicity
- Ecumenism
- Christian universalism
  - Trinitarian universalism

== See also ==
- Catholic Church (disambiguation)
- Universalist Church (disambiguation)
