= Social programs in sub-Saharan Africa =

Social protection in sub-Saharan Africa tends not to be very developed and yet the growth of some of the region's economies and concerted attempts to tackle poverty mean that this situation may change considerably in the future.

== Social security in Africa ==
Countries across Africa are at different stages of creating comprehensive and inclusive social security systems. Although some are further along this journey than others, most have introduced some form of arrangement for pension provision or have social security as a strategic goal.

Similar to global trends, the vast majority of retirement income in Africa is funded by governments, derived from taxes or other forms of government revenue (essentially a pay-as-you-go system or PAYG). With a large proportion of formal sector workers concentrated in the civil service, pension funds for public sector workers are well established and benefits are often more substantial compared to the private sector. Defined Benefit (DB) schemes dominate across the continent although regional differences are notable. While DB schemes are common in many Francophone West African countries, the Maghreb region as well as Egypt & Sudan, Defined Contribution (DC) schemes (often provident schemes) are prevalent in English-speaking parts of Africa, especially sub-Saharan Africa.

Coverage on the continent however, is much lower compared to the rest of the world. Data from the International Labour Office's 2014/15 World Social Protection Report estimates that currently only 16.9% of older people in sub-Saharan Africa receive an old age pension. Although this number is higher in North Africa at 36.7%, it is still considerably lower than much of the developed world (90% in North America and Europe). A recent report on the pension sector in the East African Community estimates that between 80-90% of the population is not reached via public or private pension fund schemes.

In part, this is due to the unique circumstances in Africa including demographics (young population), a large informal employment sector, migration with limited pension portability, and dependency on government finances. The pace of regulatory reform has also led to divergent coverage trends between countries and regions.

To meet this challenge, Africa has been on a journey to design, finance and deliver social security to the continent. Many countries have transitioned in line with the multi-pillar model proposed by the World Bank in their 2005 report[1] and subsequent refinements. While each country has forged its own distinctive path, two main areas of focus have emerged. The first is the introduction of a basic safety net or non-contributory pension for those who have no other income. Pension systems provide a way of securing long-term savings but also an indirect way to alleviate poverty, which affects many on the continent. A number of African countries including South Africa, Namibia, Mauritius and Lesotho have used non-contributory universal pensions as a foundation for broad social security coverage. Many pensioners spend their pension income on books, school fees and health care for grandchildren. Research suggests transmission via a basic retirement income has the ability to significantly alleviate poverty and directly impact socioeconomic factors.

The second trend has been a move from unfunded to funded solutions, and DB to DC schemes, albeit at a slower pace than in developed countries. This is a broad reflection of the increased pressure on government budgets, and the unsustainable fiscal burden that PAYG pension systems create.

African economies have made great strides to shape their social security systems. Importantly, the continent has been building institutions that account for African priorities and their unique challenges. Regulators have looked beyond the developed world experience to regions such as Latin America and Eastern Europe for their learnings. Nigeria for example was the first on the continent to explore the Chilean-style individual-funded accounts and also cites Mexico as a country they examined as part of their reform journey. Extending and ensuring an adequate level of social security remains a continually evolving process as governments and regulators across the world adapt to changes in the environment and financial markets, no less so in Africa.

== School meal programs in Africa ==
Many countries across Africa have incorporated school feeding programs, to varying extents, into their school systems. As of 2017/18, an estimated 60 million children of all ages received food through school meal programs in Africa. In aggregate, that is 21% of school-age children (and 30% of primary school-age children) who benefit in some way from school meal programs, including those that serve hot cooked meals, snacks, or take-home rations. The largest programs are found in Egypt (reaching 11.52 million children), Nigeria (9.83 million), and South Africa (8.95 million). As of 2017/18, eight countries reached at least half of their school age children with school food, including Namibia (50%), Burkina Faso (52%), São Tomé and Príncipe (53%), Lesotho (56%), Botswana (62%), Zimbabwe (67%), South Africa (72%), and eSwatini (85%).

As of 2017/18, at least US$1.3 billion was allocated to school meal programs on the African continent. The budgets and budgets per beneficiary child vary across countries, usually rising with wealth. Sources of funding also vary across countries, with lower income countries more likely to draw a large share of funding from external sources, such as the World Food Programme. Nevertheless, when aggregating across countries, an estimated 80% of the summed budget for school feeding on the continent comes from African governments.

In Africa, there has recently been a trend in favor of home-grown school feeding, or school meal programs that purposively source their foods from local or domestic production in order to support smallholder farmers and the local agricultural economy. In 2003, the New Partnership for Africa's Development (NEPAD) orchestrated pledges to implement home-grown school feeding from 11 countries.

== Equatorial Guinea ==
Equatorial Guinea has enjoyed some of the highest growth rates in the world (37% a year on average in the past 10 years), based largely on its oil sector. With an economy 20 times bigger than it was in the mid-90s, the government can now afford to start expanding its social programs, especially as tremendous inequality means that despite a $14,941 average GDP per capita ($30,000 according to UN population estimates), over 75% of the population live below the poverty line and over 40% in extreme poverty.

One particularly vulnerable group in Equatorial Guinea are the under-18s, who make up 50% of the population and whose poor levels of nutrition and education risk the country's future stability and economic growth. The country's under-five child mortality rate is the fourth highest in the world, and maternal mortality is also very high. Costs remain a key barrier to access to key public services and, despite few waivers for the particularly vulnerable, confusion prevents many from taking advantage. Low demand, as well as poor supply, of public services is also important in understanding the limits to social protection and poverty relief in Equatorial Guinea.

Despite the free provision of primary education and enrollment being relatively high, net primary school attendance rates are low, at 61% for boys and 60% for girls in 2000–2007, according to UNICEF data. Drop-out rates are high and only 33% reach the last grade of primary school, while at secondary school net attendance rates are even lower, at 23% for boys and 22% for girls. A key cause is that children are involved in child labor, in 2001, a UNICEF study showed that 51% of boys and 58% of girls worked during school hours. Youth migration (over 50% of have moved to urban areas and do not live with their parents) and sexual exploitation risk their development and Equatorial Guinea's.

A small formal social security system does exist but reaches only a small proportion of the employed (or formerly employed) in the urban formal sector and social protection coverage for the poor is very limited. One promising recent initiative is the establishment of the Social Needs Fund, financed by the Government and administered by USAID, and is designed to bring in international technical expertise to support institutional capacity building in the social sectors and to support social sector service delivery.

== Mali ==
Mali has made significant economic progress (on average 5% a year between 1994 and 2006) considering a series of adverse economic shocks (such as drought) and has made some progress on reducing poverty and poverty related indicators, yet poverty remains high at 59.2% in 2006 and as in many sub-Saharan African countries, children make up a high proportion of the population - 54% in the case of Mali

Mali's National Social Protection Policy recognises the multiple dimensions of social protection that correspond to a range of social, economic, health and environmental risks. Its main focus is health-related risks and interventions, with areas of the strategy that relate to the social and economic risks of the poor classified as 'social development', including 'social action and social assistance', e.g. 'vulnerable' children (defined as those living without parental care or in households where the head has disabilities or is ill) qualify for some forms of social assistance.

There are also movements towards expanding social security. Two new health-related social protection programmes, the Compulsory Medical Insurance (AMO) and the Medical Assistance Regime (RAMED) are to start operating in 2010. AMO's beneficiaries will be active or retired functionaries, formal sector employees, and members of parliament. RAMED aims to provide free health care to the destitute (those proven to have no sources of income). Mali's social protection programmes are addressed in one of the three pillars of the Growth and Poverty Reduction Strategy Paper (GPRSP), which refers to strengthening the social sector through risk mitigation and social protection for the poorest and most marginalised groups, extending better social protection coverage for the whole population.

However, criticisms remain that the main focus of the GPRSP 2007–2011 is the other two pillars: 'development of infrastructure in the productive sector' and 'consolidation of structural reforms'. Financial limits remain a major barrier to the extension of social protection. Other criticisms relate to the need to address to the demand for public services, as well as the supply side.

== South Africa ==
South Africa has one of the most extensive social welfare systems among developing countries in the world. In 2019, an estimated 18 million people received some form of social grant provided by the government.

Social welfare programmes have a long history in South Africa. The earliest form of social welfare programme in South Africa is the poor relief distributed by the Dutch East India Company and the Dutch Reformed Church (DRC) in 1657. The institutionalised social welfare system was established after the British conquered the Dutch Cape Colony in 1806.

However, the social welfare system focused mainly on poor whites and excluded blacks. Under apartheid, the social welfare services for Africans, Indians and Coloreds were separated from that for whites. The allocation of social welfare resources favoured whites. The post-apartheid government launched the Reconstruction and Development Programme (RDP) in 1994 and published the White Paper for Social Welfare in 1997 to establish the framework of social welfare system in post-apartheid South Africa. They were aimed to address racial disparity in the delivery of social welfare services. Growth, Employment and Redistribution (GEAR) was launched in 1996 in response to the 1996 currency crisis. GEAR reduces government's spending, leading to the shrinkage of social grants. Social assistance, including grants and public works, is funded through tax revenue, unlike statutory and voluntary funds that are funded by employers and employees.

Social welfare programmes in South Africa include cash assistance, unemployment insurance, medical provisions, and housing subsidies. Cash assistance is distributed by the South African Social Security Agency on behalf of the Department of Social Development of South Africa (DSD). The cash assistance programmes that are currently available include the Child support Grant, the Foster child Grant, old-age pension, disability grant, care dependency grant, Social Relief of Distress R350/370 and war veterans grant.

There are both support and criticism regarding the social welfare programmes in South Africa. Supporters argue that grants such as the Child Support Grant and the old-age pension improve the nutrition status and school enrolment rates of poor children. However, critics points out corruption and maladministration in the social welfare system and the poor quality of RDP housing.

== See also ==
- Social security
