= Universals (disambiguation) =

Universals may refer to:

- Cultural universals
- Linguistic universals
- Universals in metaphysics
  - Aristotle's theory of universals
  - Problem of universals
- Universals (Central Council of Ukraine), a series of legal declarations 1917–1918

== See also ==
- Universal (disambiguation)
