= Universality =

Universality most commonly refers to:

- Universality (philosophy)
- Universality (dynamical systems)
- Universality (novel), 2025 novel by Natasha Brown

Universality principle may refer to:

- In statistics, universality principle, a property of systems that can be modeled by random matrices
- In law, as a synonym for universal jurisdiction
- In moral philosophy, the first formulation of Kant's categorical imperative.

Universality may also refer to several concepts that are also known as "universality"

- Background independence, a concept of universality in physical science
- Universality class, a concept of universality in statistical mechanics
- Turing-complete, a concept of universality in computation
- Universal property, a mathematical concept
- Universal jurisdiction, in international law
- Universality slot, quota system used at the Olympics
- Lepton universality in the Standard Model of particle physics.
- Universality of the Church, a theological concept in Christian ecclesiology
- Universality Places, wild card entries granted to underrepresented nations in Summer Olympic Games

== See also ==
- Universal (disambiguation)
- Universalism (disambiguation)
- Universality probability
- Universalization
- Universalizability
