= Worldwide =

Worldwide may refer to:

- Pertaining to the entire world
- Worldwide (rapper) (born 1986), American rapper
- Pitbull (rapper) (born 1981), also known as Mr. Worldwide, American rapper
- Worldwide (Audio Adrenaline album), 2003
- Worldwide (The Death Set album), 2016
- Worldwide (Everything but the Girl album), 1991
- "Worldwide" (song), a 2011 song by Big Time Rush from BTR
- "Worldwide", a 2025 song by OsamaSon from Psykotic
- "World Wide (Remix)", a song by Outlawz from Novakane, 2001
- World-Wide Shipping, a Hong Kong–based shipping company that merged with Norwegian company Bergesen to form BW Group
- Worldwide magazine, a magazine for the Austin Motor Company by the in-house Nuffield Press
- WORLDWIDE FM, a radio station compiled by Gilles Peterson in Grand Theft Auto Online

== See also ==
- Cosmopolitanism
- International (disambiguation)
- Global (disambiguation)
- World
