= Kanal Global =

Swedish television channel, 2001–2015

- Country: Sweden

Ownership
- Owner: Kanal Global Television 1 AB

History
- Launched: 1 February 2001
- Closed: 15 February 2015
- Former names: DTU7 (2001-2005); Canal 7 (2005-2011)

Kanal Global was a Swedish television channel catering ethnic minorities who had just arrived to Sweden. It launched on 1 February 2001 and shut down on 15 February 2015.

== History ==
The channel traces its origins back to Miniatyr, a programme that aired on Nordic Channel (later Kanal 5) from January 1992 to 1996. Miniatyr was one of the first TV programmes in Sweden to break taboos about certain topics and also discussed the pros and cons of immigration. Although it aired in the Persian language along with the programme's title, with Iranian immigrants and descendants working in the staff, it carried Swedish subtitles.

The three Salehi brothers (Bijan, Behruoz and Behzad), who had studied film and television in Sweden, were part of a larger group of Iranians who fled Iran in the years following the Islamic Revolution of 1979. The Salehis wanted to collaborate with Sveriges Television, but upon SVT's rejection, they set up Miniatyr through their production company ISB Movieproduction. With Nordic Channel at launch having a policy where independent production companies bought airtime, the Salehis accepted the challenge and premiered Miniatyr on 1 January 1992. Iranian families in Sweden bought decoders to watch the channel and have access to the programme.

Miniatyr left Femman (at the time, it was in the process of being renamed as Kanal 5) in 1996, as the new owners decided to halt the airing of programmes from minority interest groups. Eventually the Salehis decided to start a TV channel on a limited budget instead. The channel was named DTU7 and its license was submitted by Behrouz Salehi, for a slot on Boxer TV Access, commencing broadcasts in 2001. In October 2001, DTU7 started airing news of events from Afghanistan taking the advantage of its contract with Al-Jazeera, on weekdays between 11:00 and 12:00.

In 2005, the channel was renamed Canal 7. Aftonbladet, which had just started its own channel, Aftonbladet TV7, cried foul at the new name in 2006, as the channel also had the number 7 in its name. Canal 7 CEO Jörgen Nilsson and the channel's team were unaware of the situation. Turner later bought Aftonbladet's channel and renamed it TNT7, igniting a continuation of the naming conflict, sparked by concerns of confusion from potential advertisers on both channels. This elevated Canal 7's recognition.

Canal 7 started an agreement with TV4 in 2008, and the channel's Nowruz broadcasts aired on TV4 Plus from 2008 to 2014.

After consultation from a member of the TV4 Group, the channel was renamed Kanal Global in March 2011. The channel's viewers complained because Com Hem and Boxer subscribers wanted Canal 7 and not TV7. Bijan Salehi claimed that they were the first to use the number 7 in the channel's name, but Aftonbladet and Millennium Media Group rejected potential dialogue. TV4 later renamed TV4 Plus as Sjuan.

TV4 got new management in 2014 and the costs of producing were too high for Kanal Global to handle. The rise in the number of refugees during the refugee crisis of the mid-2010s and the subsequent rise of terrorism and Jihadism in Sweden, as well as the Syrian civil war, led to the channel giving more prominence to these topics. The more serious the topics and themes of the programmes were, the less providers were willing to pay. Com Hem relocated the channel to the international section, while Tele 2 refused to carry.

Facing a grim situation, in December 2014, the channel announced the shutdown of its linear operations the following year. The last broadcast was on 15 February 2015.

== Target audience ==
The channel's target consisted of Swedes with interest in foreign cultures and Swedes with other foreign backgrounds. For foreigners in Sweden, it also provided programmes on summer traditions and how to declare their rent.

The programme selection included community programmes, cooking shows and travel shows. Miniatyr (Persian) and Hola Hola Amigos (Spanish) discussed current events that affected their communities. The channel also aired Brazilian and Latin American soap operas and international feature films, as well as Swedish feature films produced between the 1930s and 60s. There were also Bollywood theme nights.

As of 2002, DTU7 carried programmes from RTS, Federalna TV, RTK, IRIB Jaam-e-Jam, Al-Jazeera, LBC International, TV8, Prima TV and TVN24. Between 17:30 and 07:00, Com Hem and Boxer's feed of DTU7 carry simulcasts of Al-Jazeera (Mondays to Thursdays) and Jaam-e-Jam (Fridays to Sundays).

Kanal Global's language was Swedish and all of its imported material aired with Swedish subtitles.
