= Global (cutlery) =

Japanese cutlery manufacturer

GLOBAL
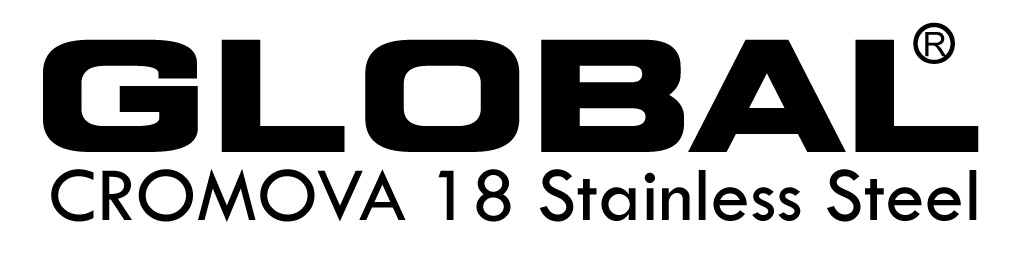
- Company type: Private Company
- Industry: Kitchenware
- Founded: 1985; 41 years ago
- Headquarters: Tsubame, Japan
- Area served: Worldwide
- Key people: Minoru Tsuchida, Komin Yamada, Yuzo Watanabe
- Products: Kitchen knives, accessories
- Owner: Yoshida Metal Industry
- Website: global-knife.com/en/

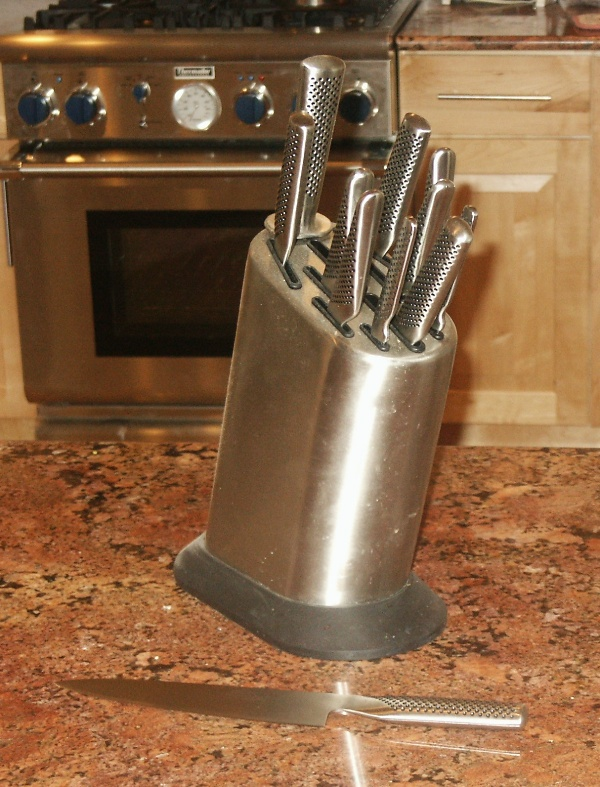
Set of GLOBAL knives in holding block

GLOBAL is a Japanese brand of kitchen knives and accessory tools owned and manufactured by the Yoshikin factory of Japan (also known as the Yoshida Metal Industry Co. Ltd). The Yoshikin Factory is owned by the Watanabe family and located in Tsubame, Japan.

== History ==
Yoshida Metal Industry Co. Ltd. was established in 1954 as a western tableware manufacturer in Niigata prefecture, producing hollow handled table knives for Western markets. In 1960 Yoshikin introduced the Bunmei series of knives, traditional Japanese-looking knives that used a new alloy steel, able to be sharpened like carbon steel, but with a mixture of molybdenum and vanadium that made the steel more resistant to rust (now known colloquially as Japanese steel). In 1983, Yoshikin hired a Japanese industrial designer, Komin Yamada, to create a knife design that combined these two manufacturing techniques. GLOBAL began its international expansion under Yuzo Watanabe in Japan in 1985.

In 2006, the G Series knives were placed #46 on the Japanesque Modern Committee listing. In the years since GLOBAL has continued to come out with new lines of knives including the SAI line, the UKON line and most recently the GLOBAL NI line in 2015. Currently, the GLOBAL NI line is the most recent line of knives released for sale to the public.

== Features ==
Compared to conventional European knives such as J. A. Henckels or Wüsthof, GLOBAL knives are made from a significantly harder alloy of steel and use a thinner blade. In addition, the cutting edge of the blades are ground at a more shallow 15° angle, which produces a sharper knife that also hold its edge for longer and allows for more accurate work. The one drawback of this design however is that when the blade does dull it take longer to regain that same quality of edge through sharpening. Because of this, the manufacturer recommends using whetstones and ceramic sharpening rods as opposed to the European sharpening steel.

GLOBAL knives have black dimples on the handle and on one model of their knife block. The black dimples found on the handle serve mainly an aesthetic purpose however are also intended to increase the amount of grip the user is able to get on the knife.

The company subsequently introduced specialized knife designs, including a tomato knife and a crab/lobster knife. They also make eating utensils.

GLOBAL knives have been used by professional chefs including Anthony Bourdain, Ludo Lefebvre and Michel Roux Jr.

== Construction ==
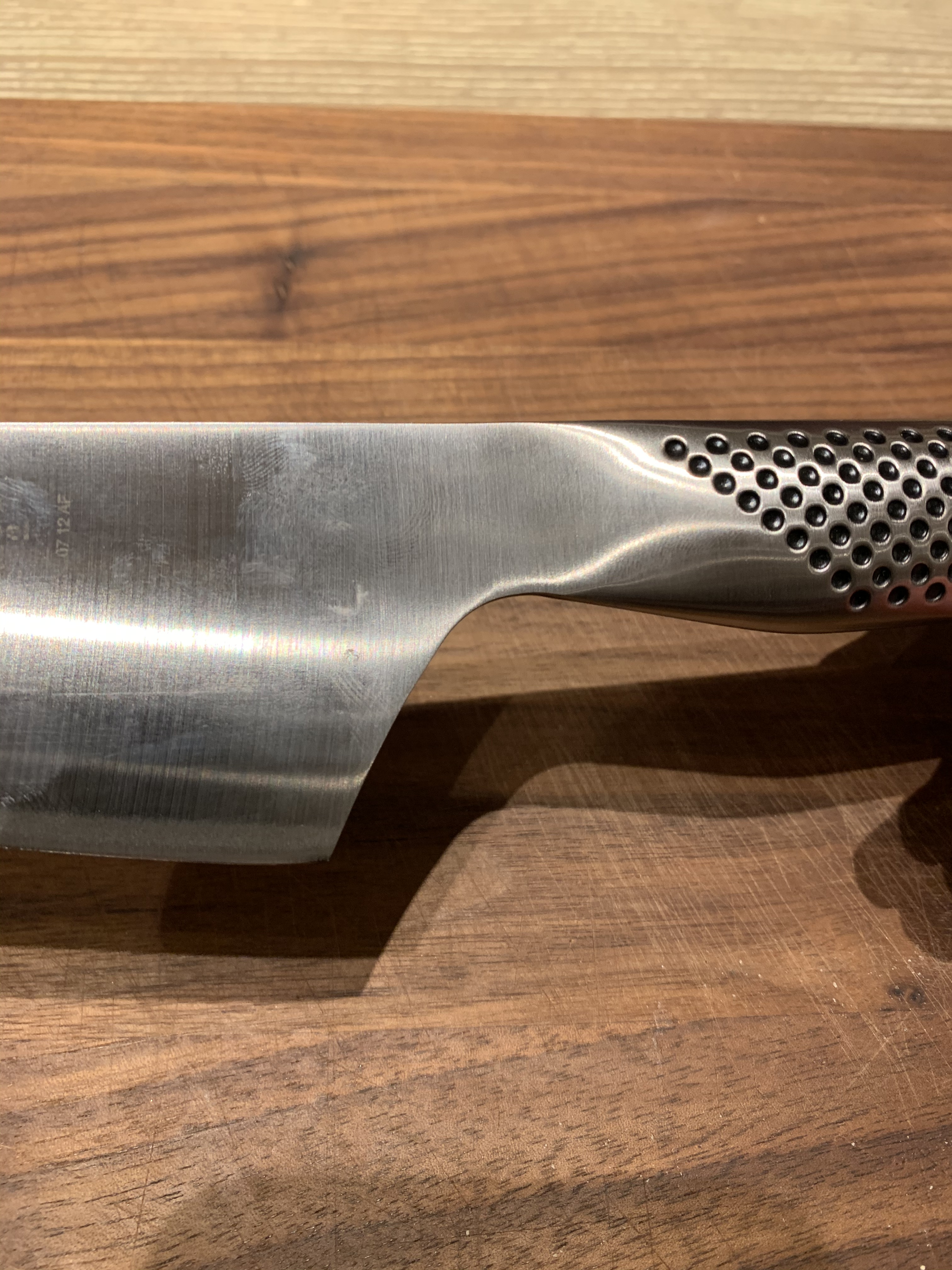
The welding point on a GLOBAL knife that attaches the handle and blade

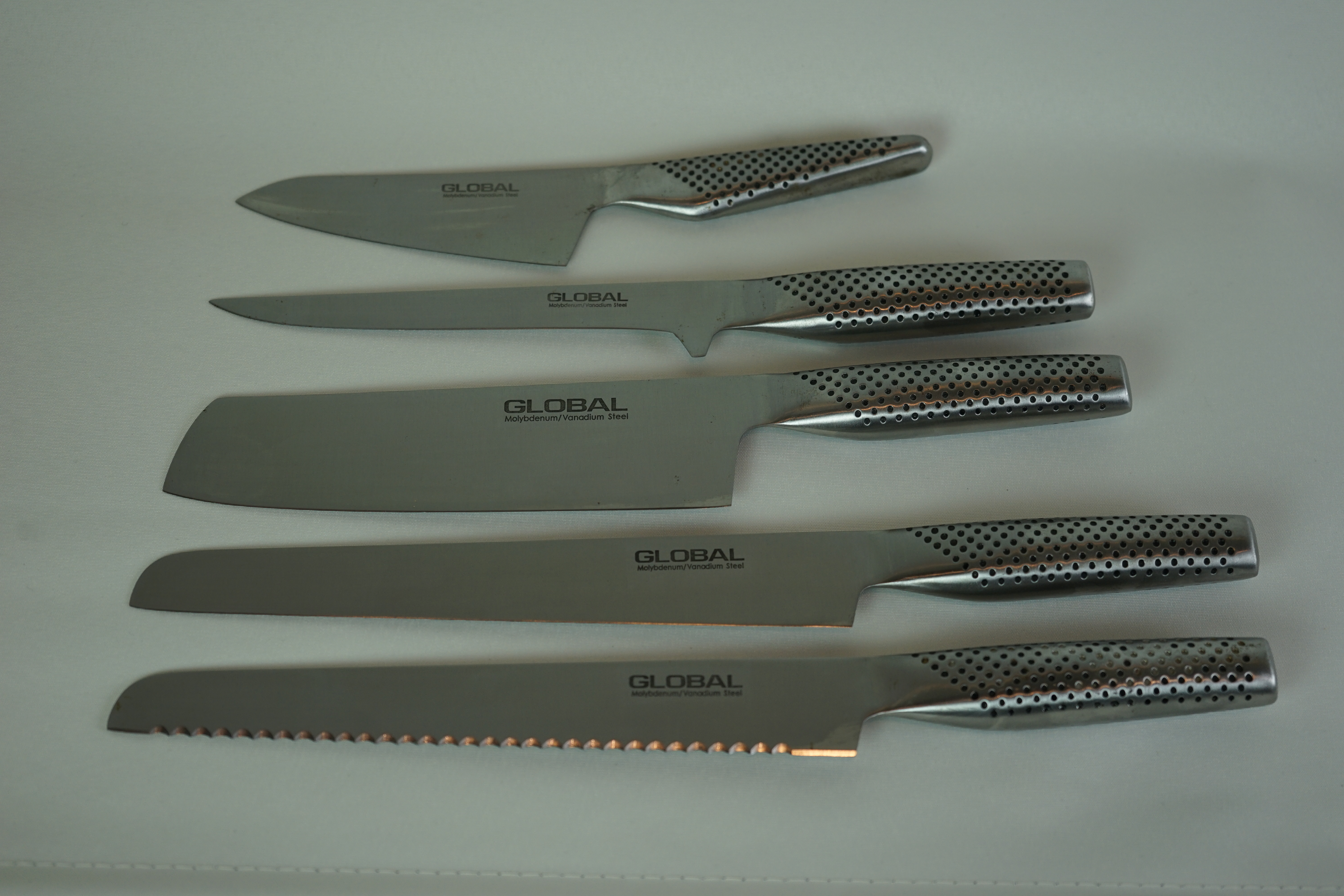
Five knives from the GLOBAL (cutlery) range

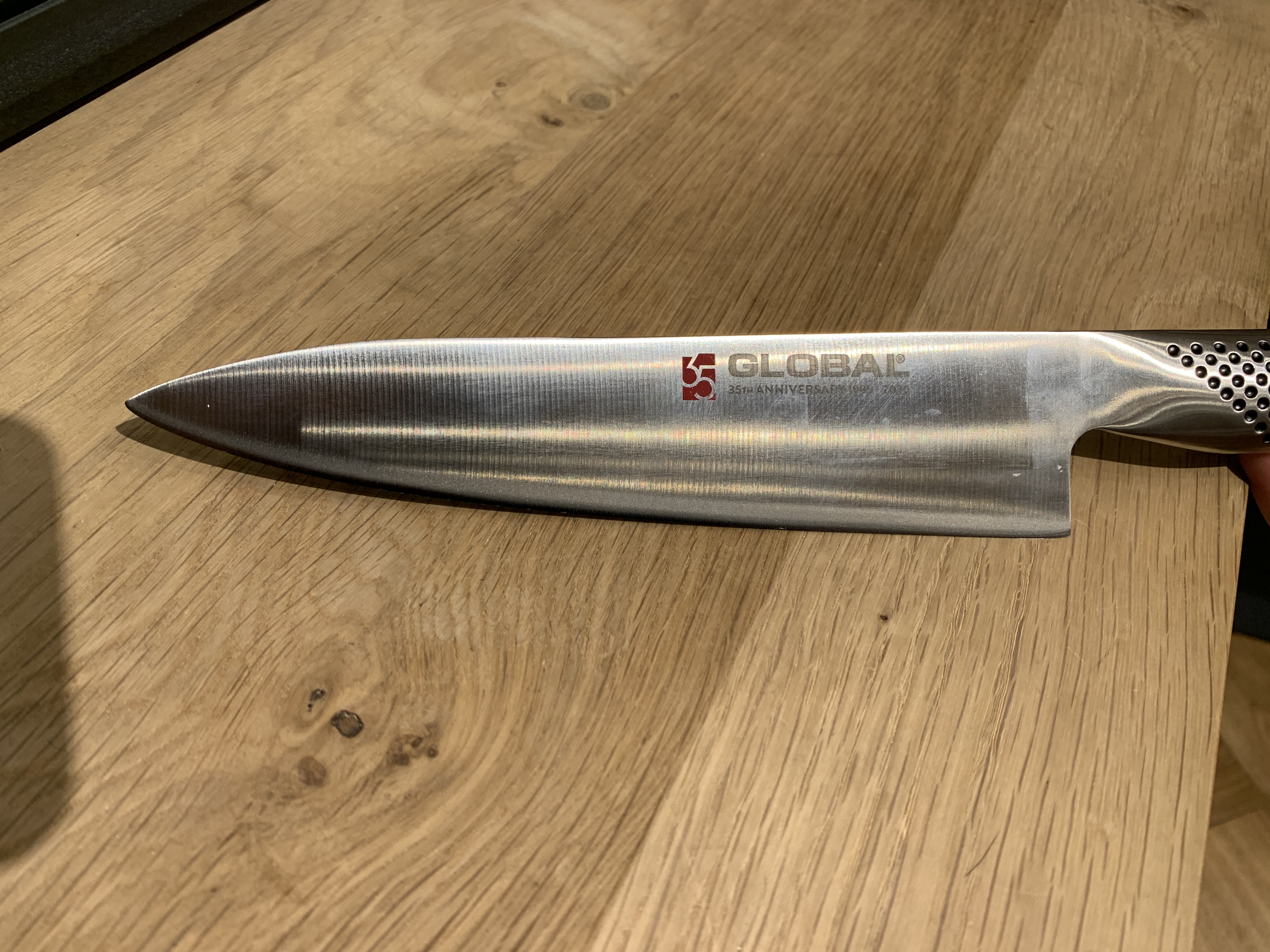
A GLOBAL 35th Anniversary Classic Chef's Knife

Although GLOBAL Knives appear to be one seamless piece of steel they actually consist of three different pieces that have all been carefully crafted together to give a one piece appearance. The three pieces that make up the knife are first stamped out of a sheet of CROMOVA 18 steel, the two pieces of the handle are then TIG welded together. The hollow handle is then injected with fine sand to add weight and balance to the knife.
