= Global Vision (Canada) =

Global Vision is a Canadian non-profit organization founded in 1991 by Terry Clifford, two-term Member of Parliament for the London—Middlesex riding (1984 - 1993).

Its flagship program, "Junior Team Canada", was modelled after Team Canada, a national government trade mission program led by the Prime Minister. Youth delegates are selected in a nationwide competition for economic missions abroad.

Past missions have been led to Brazil, South Korea, Vietnam, Colombia, Peru, Germany, China, England, Texas, India, Philippines, Malaysia, Singapore, and Hong Kong.
