= Universalist Church (disambiguation) =

The Universalist Church was a religious denomination, more formally known as Universalist Church of America.

Universalist Church may also refer to:

- Universalist Church of West Hartford or the Universalist Church, a church in Connecticut
- Universalist Church (Mitchellville, Iowa)
- Universalist Church of Westfield Center, a church in Westfield Center, Ohio

== See also ==
- List of Unitarian, Universalist, and Unitarian Universalist churches
