= Global Air =

Global Air may refer to:

- Global Air (Australian airline)
- Global Air (Bulgaria); see List of defunct airlines of Bulgaria
- Global Air (Mexico)
- Swiss Global Air Lines
- Global Air (Iraq)

== See also ==
- Global Airways (disambiguation)
- Global Airlines
- Global Crossing Airlines, operating as GlobalX Airlines
- Western Global Airlines
