= CityWalk =

CityWalk or City Walk may refer to:

- Universal CityWalk, entertainment and retail districts located adjacent to the theme parks of Universal Parks & Resorts, United States
- City Walk, Canberra, Australia
- City Walk, Dubai, United Arab Emirates
- Citywalk, Hong Kong, a shopping centre in Tsuen Wan, New Territories, Hong Kong
- Select Citywalk, a premier shopping mall located in the Saket District Centre, in Saket, New Delhi
