= GlobalVision =

Software company specializing in packaging and labeling

- Native name: Global Vision Inc
- Type: Privately held company
- Industry: product packaging industry
- Founded: 1990
- Headquarters: Montreal, Quebec, Canada
- Area served: Worldwide
- Key people: Reuben Malz, CEO
- Website: globalvision.co

GlobalVision is a SaaS software company specializing in packaging and labeling. The company was founded in 1990 and is headquartered in Montreal, Canada, and has regional offices in the UK and Germany.

== History ==
GlobalVision Inc. (GlobalVision) was founded by Reuben Malz in 1990.

In 2013, Pfizer contracted with GlobalVision for packaging quality control. That same year, the company introduced its first web-based quality control platform. This was followed by the introduction of a more advanced version of the platform, Proofware, in 2014.

In 2017, GlobalVision released a desktop quality control platform.

In 2018, GlobalVision partnered with Pantone and X-Rite to launch the world’s first digital color inspection system for print and packaging.

== See also ==
- VirtualBox
