= Universal basic services =

Social security system

Universal basic services (UBS) is an idea of a form of social security in which all citizens or residents of a community, region, or country receive unconditional access to a range of free, basic, public services, funded by taxpayers and provided collectively by a government or public institution. The basic services commonly include:

- Education
- Health care
- Housing
- Essential food
- Water and sanitation
- Buses and trains
- Basic internet
- Legal aid and representation

Further services, where there are low or zero marginal costs for adding further users are:

- Electricity and heating
- Retail banking
- Public broadcast media

== History ==
Universal Basic Services is a development of the welfare state model. The term appeared in 2017 in press and the first modelling in a report from University College London (UCL)'s Institute for Global Prosperity. The British Labour Party welcomed the report and announced in 2018 that UBS would be incorporated into the party's platform.

== UBS inclusion rationale ==
Universal Basic Services are provided on the basis that they are necessary to sustain and enable each citizen's material safety, opportunity to contribute, or participate in the decision-making processes of their community, region or country, even if they lack any financial income. The UBS model extends the notion of a social safety net to include those elements necessary to fulfil a larger role in society.

To substantiate inclusion in a UBS provision services meet at least one of these conditions:

- necessary to maintain the individual's or the society's material safety
- necessary to enable the individual's personal effort to use their skills and abilities to contribute to their society, either for remuneration or not
- necessary to allow the individual to participate in the political system(s) within which they live

The following table represents rationales used for the inclusion of certain services in a UBS definition:

UBS inclusion rationales
UBS	Material safety	Opportunity	Participation
Housing	♦		
Electricity and heating	♦		
Food and water	♦		
Health and care	♦		
Education		♦	♦
Transport		♦	♦
Information		♦	♦
Legal	♦	♦	♦

The specific content of any set of UBS varies according to the resources available to the society and their political definitions of what constitutes basic provision - see UBS Inclusion Rationale. Many societies already provide some elements of UBS, such as public education and public healthcare services.

== Service definitions and examples ==
=== Shelter ===
- Homeless shelter
- Housing First
- Public housing
- Right to housing

Public housing are built to provide affordable or subsidized housing for lower income earners. This is inline with rationale behind the UBS, to sustain social inclusion. UN-Habitat estimate that approximately 40% of the total world population will lack access to affordable housing by 2030.

=== Sustenance ===
- Food bank
- Food security
- Human right to water and sanitation
- Right to food
- Supplemental Nutrition Assistance Program
- Soup kitchen

=== Health and care ===
Services that support health, and services which provide for care of disabled, elderly and others.

- Publicly funded health care
- Right to health
- Universal health care

In The Case for Universal Basic Services Coote and Percy argue for the expansion of the Care service definition to include childcare.

=== Education ===
Schooling and training.

- Free education
- Public education
- Right to education
- Universal access to education

=== Transport ===
Local transport to access other services, shops and employment.

- Free public transport

=== Information ===
Access to communications that enable participation in society as well as access to the other services.

- Freedom of information
- Municipal wireless network
- Public library
- Right to Internet access

=== Legal ===
The Legal category UBS is a broad definition to include safety services, legal assistance and the apparatus necessary to sustain the society's legal system and political system. The courts, assemblies, political salaries, civil services and other aspects of the structure of the society are included in the definition of Legal UBS.

- Emergency medical services
- Policing
- Firefighting
- Legal aid
- Courts
- Right to counsel
- Social services agencies

=== Local service definitions ===
UBS are designed and delivered by governments and institutions which tailor the exact content of the services to meet the particular circumstances of the local community.

== Funding ==
In the standardised definition of UBS the cost of the services is funded by revenues derived from income taxes, which are hypothecated to the delivery of the UBS.

Most UBS services in societies around the world today are funded out of general government revenues, such as publicly funded healthcare.

=== Model costing ===
In October 2017 the Institute for Global Prosperity at University College London (UCL) produced a report modelling the cost of UBS for the United Kingdom. The report modelled funding the UBS services (£42.16Bn) from a reduction in the Personal Tax Allowance.

=== Cost justifications for UBS ===
The cost of extending public services as universal entitlements is justified through some combination of the following savings:

- increased productivity through greater support for deeper specialisation
- substitution of cash benefits
- enhanced efficiency of delivery resulting from local design and demand management
- long term savings in labour costs as UBS substitute for increases in pay

== Labour market effects ==
The two most common effects on operagraphics (labour markets) are:

1. increased flexibility through enhanced access to job opportunities (e.g. transport access)
2. reduced upward pressure on labour rates through the substitution of direct financial cost ("social wage")
  1. The 2017 UCL report shows potential cost replacement of 80% of average pay for the lowest income decile

== Environmental benefits ==
UBS can lead to lower emissions, particularly through greater use of public transport.

== Criticisms and conditions ==
- UBS may be an inefficient method to cover the personal and necessarily individual living costs associated with needs such as toiletries, requiring any UBS to be supplemented by some form of cash transfers or credit system that can be used by citizens to satisfy personally specific living costs. This component could be delivered as a form of basic income, as modelled in the UCL report, albeit at the low end of the scale within which basic income distributions are commonly proposed.

== See also ==
- Basic needs
- Right to a healthy environment
- Right to clothing
- Social protection floor
- UK enterprise law
- Universal design

== Sources ==
- Percy, Andrew; Moore, Henrietta; Portes, Jonathan; Reed, Howard (Oct 3, 2017). Social prosperity for the future: A proposal for Universal Basic Services. UCL Institute for Global Prosperity.
- Coote, Anna; Kasliwal, Pritika; Percy, Andrew (May 16, 2019). Universal Basic Services: Theory and Practice - A literature review. UCL Institute for Global Prosperity.
