= UCMSA Universalis =

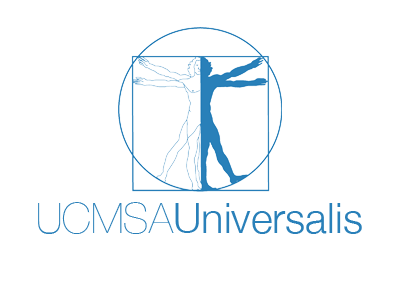
- The UCMSA Universalis logo, designed in September 2013.

Association Information
- Full name: University College Maastricht Study Association
- Abbreviation: UCMSA Universalis
- Formation: December 3, 2002; 23 years ago
- Legal status: Study Association
- Location: Maastricht, The Netherlands
- Membership: 800-900
- Official language: English
- Affiliations: University College Maastricht, Maastricht University
- Website: http://ucmsa.nl

UCMSA Universalis is the student association directly affiliated with the University College Maastricht. It is run by UCM students for UCM students and contributes to both academic and social life at UCM. The association is involved in the organisation of open-mic nights, parties, charity fundraisers, student representation, poetry readings, board games nights, and other events. Following a structure typical of Maastricht University study associations, it is run by a student board. The Universalis student board consists of an Executive board, a Social Board, an Academic Board, and an Independent Body. Board members serve for one or two semesters after which they can re-apply. Active members of the association are organised as committees that provide services for all students at the college. All new students automatically become members upon enrollment at the college.

== Organisation structure ==
All positions are democratically elected in a General Assembly of Universalis members with elections organized by the Independent Body in coordination with the outgoing board.

The Board manages the administration of the association via the President, Secretary, and Treasurer. They compose the legal board of the statutes and are kvk-registered officers of the association. The Executive Board includes all the previously mentioned members, and the Marketing Executive. They handle the financial, administrative, and long-term strategy duties for the association as a whole whilst facilitating the Social and Academic Boards in semesterly planning.

There are currently four members on the Social Board: Social Chair, Acquisitions, Social Events, and UC Relations. Social Board meetings are held once a week. Universalis's committees operate under the Social Board, who seek to financially and logistically facilitate all committee activities.

The Academic Board has four members: Academic Chair, Academic Events, Student Academic Advisor and FSE Representative. The Academic Board represents students by being part of the University College Maastricht's Educational Program Committee (EPC), responsible for ensuring academic quality of the program. The FSE representative also represents students in the EPC of LAS, which ensures the academic quality and interaction of the three chambers, University College Venlo, Maastricht Science Program and UCM. Together with EPC members of the other programs of the Faculty of Science and Engineering (FSE), the Academic Board is part of the FSE student council. They also organize Academic conferences, guest speakers, academic workshops, and other academic projects and events such as the yearly Mentor Programme.

The Independent Body consists of three to five students elected by a general assembly with the goal of keeping all boards in accordance with the association's Statutes and Policy Manual. They also serve a functional role in General Assemblies and voting procedures.

== History ==
At the beginning of September 2002 UCM's first students gathered in the back yard of the newly founded college. Several students formed an informal founding committee to get a student society started. Because the diversity of UCM's students and its curriculum, they decided that Da Vinci's Homo Universalis was a suitable symbol for the student society's identity. It represents the juxtaposition of different interests in its members and of the diverse UCM student body. The founding committee decided to call the association Universalis and Brian Pagán designed the logo, a stylised version of the Vitruvian Man. The first unofficial Universalis general meeting was held on 19 September 2002. The organisation's structure was drawn up by the founding committee and the first board was elected. The organisation was registered with the Maastricht Chamber of Commerce and certified by a notary on 3 December 2002, marking the official establishment of UCM Study Association Universalis.

UCMSA Universalis joined University College Student Representatives of the Netherlands (UCSRN) in 2014 and has been an active member since.
