= Welfare culture =

Behavioural consequences of providing poverty relief to low-income individuals

Welfare culture refers to the behavioral consequences of providing poverty relief (i.e., welfare) to low-income individuals. Welfare is considered a type of social protection, which may come in the form of remittances, such as 'welfare checks', or subsidized services, such as free/reduced healthcare, affordable housing, and more. Pierson (2006) has acknowledged that, like poverty, welfare creates behavioral ramifications, and that studies differ regarding whether welfare empowers individuals or breeds dependence on government aid. Pierson also acknowledges that the evidence of the behavioral effects of welfare varies across countries (such as Norway, France, Denmark, and Germany), because different countries implement different systems of welfare.

== United States ==
In the United States, the debate over the impact of welfare traces back as far as the New Deal, but it later became a more mainstream political controversy with the birth of modern welfare under President Lyndon B. Johnson's Great Society. The term "welfare culture," however, was not coined until 1986, by Lawrence Mead.

=== Welfare in the United States ===
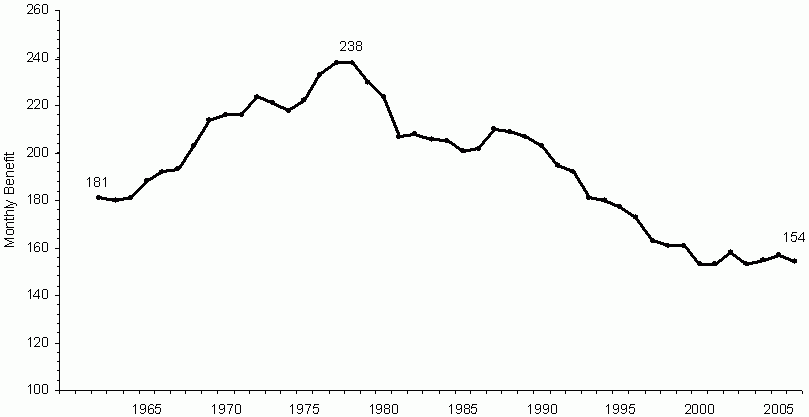
Decline in welfare benefits since 1962. (in 2006 dollars)

Welfare may refer to any government-based aid used to promote the well-being of its citizens. In recent decades, however, welfare has been restricted to refer to the Temporary Assistance to Needy Families program (TANF), which provides monthly stipends for indigent families that meet a specific array of criteria.

The term "welfare culture" uses the more broad interpretation of welfare, all government social programs. However, scholars like David Ellwood and Lawrence Summers (1985) believe that the debate over welfare culture could be more accurate if each specific welfare program were examined individually. Specific programs include Medicare, Medicaid, unemployment benefits, and disability benefits.

=== Evolution of the debate in the United States ===
Kent R. Weaver argues that most scholars cite the Social Security Act of 1935 as the origin of the American welfare state. That reform enacted a wide expanse of services for the poor and financially stressed, including unemployment benefits, Aid to Families with Dependent Children (later replaced in by the Temporary Assistance to Needy Families program under the Clinton administration), retirement income stipends, subsidized housing, and many others.

Scholars such as June Axinn and Mark J. Stern (2007) estimate that the Social Security Act of 1935 and the newly institutionalized programs accompanying the New Deal increased the capacity to find employment, avoid starvation, and secure some form of affordable housing. Furthermore, economist Robert Cohen (1973) estimated that the New Deal sparked a reduction in unemployment from 20% to 15% by the end of the 1940s.

Stanley Feldman and John Zaller (1992) cite a number of economists and political historians who opposed government-based aid, because such critics credit the economic stimulus during World War II as the true solution to the unemployment and poverty of the Great Depression. During the war, American industries began to produce military weapons, food, and other material needs for the troops. The new economic incentive, in addition to a net export and an influx in gold, reduced interest rates, increased investments, and sparked job growth. Christine Romber (1992) and various other economic historians began to criticize the New Deal as the cause for unnecessary and unjustified reliance on government programs.

However, Jerold Rusk (2008), a political scientist, recognizes a consensus among economic, history, and political scholars, which acknowledges that the effects of the New Deal are difficult to separate from the effects of World War II, which prevents any legitimate conclusion from being drawn on the debate.

In the early 1960s, President Johnson began his War on Poverty by introducing many new elements to welfare, including Medicare, Medicaid, increases in subsidized public housing, and more. David Frum (2002) believed such increases in government programs were counterproductive and found positive correlations between government aid and those who could not stay above the poverty line without such aid. Frum concluded that welfare bred dependence on the government.

During the Johnson administration, a sociologist, Senator Daniel Patrick Moynihan, published a study on the impacts of welfare on behavior during the 1960s. His report, The Negro Family: The Case for National Action (1965), is commonly referred to as the "Moynihan Report."

The Moynihan Report advocates for increased welfare for poor black families but that welfare does not empower the destitute to find solutions to their financial troubles. Moynihan stated, "The breakdown of the negro family has led to a startling increase in welfare dependency." Welfare, although helpful, was a reactive measure failing to address the true roots of poverty. Moynihan concluded that more proactive means to empower black families include the promotion of vocational training and the value of education.

Johnson's precedent for increasing welfare benefits hit its pinnacle in the late 1970s under President Jimmy Carter when Temporary Assistance to Needy Family (TANF) recipients were receiving $238 a month, adjusted for inflation. According to the Census Bureau, a strong correlation with poverty reduction is noted, suggesting a link between welfare and empowerment. Poverty dropped from 23% of the population to 12% during the Johnson years. Poverty did not see an increase again until 1982 with 15% of Americans facing poverty, two years after welfare programs experienced serious cuts under President Ronald Reagan.

However, the findings are not without their criticisms. According to the US Census Bureau, poverty had already begun to decrease before Johnson passed the Equal Opportunity Act. Additionally, unemployment reached some of its lowest rates in history under President Dwight Eisenhower near the end of the 1950s. Before Eisenhower left office, unemployment was estimated to be less than 5%.

In 1986, Lawrence Mead introduced a series of studies on welfare culture. Mead compared changes in income levels and welfare benefits across urban dwellers from the 1960s through the 1980s. Mead's studies suggest that over half of all welfare recipients will not need to stay on welfare for more than 10 years, but only 12% will be off welfare in less than 3 years. Mead concludes that welfare has demonstrated some proven effects for helping impoverished families meet their basic needs and find employment, thus acting as a tool for empowerment. However, Mead acknowledges that the welfare system can do better. Mead believes welfare culture could breed empowerment more effectively if mandatory participation in education/job training programs were required for welfare recipients.

== See also ==
- Criticisms of welfare
- Cycle of poverty
- Horatio Alger myth
- Involuntary unemployment
- Social floor
- Social insurance
- Social mobility
- Welfare economics
- Welfare system
- Welfare's effect on poverty
