= Universal Airlines =

Universal Airlines may refer to one of the following defunct airlines:

- Universal Air Lines Corporation, 1928–1934
- Universal Airlines (United States), 1966–1972
- Universal Airlines (Guyana), 2001–2005

== See also ==
- Air Universal, 2002–2007
