= Universal City =

Universal City may refer to:

== Cities ==
- Universal City, California
- Universal City, Texas

== Entertainment industry ==
- the original promotional name for the Universal Studios Lot that replaced Universal’s “Old Ranch”
- Universal City Studios, the legal registered name of Universal Pictures
- Universal City Records

== Train stations ==
- Universal City/Studio City station, for Universal Studios Hollywood in California
- Universal City Station, for Universal Studios Japan

== See also ==
- Universal CityWalk (disambiguation)
