= Social protection =

Anti-poverty policies and programs

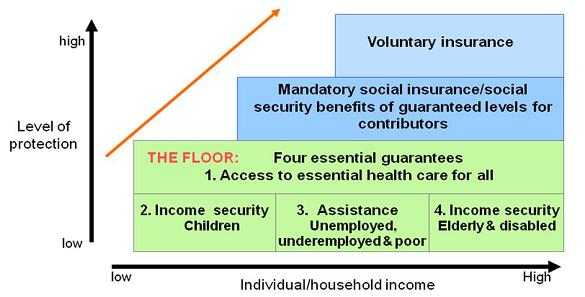
Social Protection Staircase

Social protection, as defined by the United Nations Research Institute for Social Development, is concerned with preventing, managing, and overcoming situations that adversely affect people's well-being. Social protection consists of policies and programs designed to reduce poverty and vulnerability by promoting efficient labour markets, diminishing people's exposure to risks, and enhancing their capacity to manage economic and social risks, such as unemployment, exclusion, sickness, disability, and old age. An emerging approach within social protection frameworks is Adaptive Social Protection, which integrates disaster risk management and climate change adaptation to strengthen resilience against shocks.It is one of the targets of the United Nations Sustainable Development Goal 10 aimed at promoting greater equality.

In 2023, 52.4 per cent of the world's population was covered by at least one social protection benefit, up from 42.8 per cent in 2015. The International Labour Organization estimated that 3.8 billion people remained without any social protection coverage.

The most common types of social protection

- Labor market interventions are policies and programs designed to promote employment, the efficient operation of labor markets, and the protection of workers.
- Social insurance mitigates risks associated with unemployment, ill-health, disability, work-related injury, and old age, such as health insurance or unemployment insurance.
- Social assistance is when resources, either cash or in-kind, are transferred to vulnerable individuals or households with no other means of adequate support, including single parents, the homeless, or the physically or mentally challenged.

== History ==
Traditionally, social protection has been used in the European welfare state and other parts of the developed world to maintain a certain living standard, and address transient poverty. One of the first examples of state-provided social protection can be traced to the Roman Emperor Trajan, who expanded a program for free grain to include more poor citizens of the empire. In addition, he instituted public funds to support poor children. Organized welfare was not common until the late 19th and early 20th centuries. It was during this period that in both Germany and Great Britain, welfare systems were established to target the working classes (see National Insurance). The United States followed several years later, during the Great Depression, with emergency relief for those struck the hardest. However, modern social protection has grown to envelop a much broader range of issues and purposes; it is now being used as a policy approach in developing nations, to address issues of persistent poverty and target structural causes. Moreover, it is designed to lift recipients out of poverty, rather than exclusively providing passive protection against contingencies . social protection has rapidly been used in trying to reduce and ultimately eliminate poverty and suffering in developing countries (mostly in Africa), so to enhance and promote economic and social growth.

== Types ==
=== Labor market interventions ===
Labor market interventions, consisting of both active and passive policies, provide protection for the poor who are capable of gaining employment. Passive programs, such as unemployment insurance, income support and changes in labor legislation, alleviate the financial needs of the unemployed but are not designed to improve their employability. On the other hand, active programs focus on directly increasing the access of unemployed workers to the labour market.

Active labour market policies (ALMPs) have two basic objectives: (1) economic, by reducing the risk of unemployment, increasing the ability of the unemployed to find jobs and increasing their earning capacity, productivity and earnings; and (2) social, by improving social inclusion and participation in productive employment. These programs thus aim to increase employment opportunities and address the social problems that often accompany high unemployment.

Active policies are a way of reversing the negative effects of industrial restructuring in transition economies and to help integrate vulnerable people furthest from the labor markets. They are often targeted at the long-term unemployed, workers in poor families, and particular groups with labor market disadvantages.

A European Union-funded research as part of the DRIVERS project revealed a linear relationship between investments in national active labour market policies (specifically those directed towards integrating vulnerable groups into employment) and quality of work. It found that European countries with more active labour market policies seem to have healthier, less stressed workplaces.

Active labor market programs include a wide range of activities to stimulate employment and productivity such as:

- Employment services. These services include counseling, placement assistance, job matching, labor exchanges, and other related services to improve the functioning of the labor market.
- Job Training. This includes training/retraining for the unemployed, workers in mass layoffs and youth to increase the quantity of work supply.
- Direct employment generation The promotion of small and medium enterprises (e.g., public works projects, subsidies) to increase labor demand.

A common issue in implementing successful labor market interventions is how to incorporate the informal economy, which comprises a significant portion of the workforce in developing countries. Informal employment comprises between half and three quarters of non-agricultural employment in the majority of these countries. The proportion of informal employment increases when agriculture is taken into account. Most informal workers are not covered by social security schemes, occupational safety and health measures, working conditions regulations and have limited access to health services and work-related measures of social protection. Labor market interventions work to integrate the different strategies to prevent and compensate occupational and social risks in the informal economy. The strategies that include measures to prevent and mitigate the impact of risks are the most effective.

In general, public expenditure on labor market policy (LMP) interventions falls within three main categories:

- Labor Market Services (1)
- Total LMP Measures (2-7)

training (2), job rotation & job sharing (3), employment incentives (4), supported employment & rehabilitation (5), direct job creation (6), start-up incentives (7),

- Total LMP supports (8-9)

out-of-work income maintenance and support (8), early retirement (9)

=== Social insurance ===
Social insurance schemes are contributory programs that protect beneficiaries from catastrophic expenses in exchange for regular payments of premiums. Health costs can be very high, so health insurance schemes are a popular way reducing risk in the event of shock. However, an individual with low income may not be able to afford insurance. Some argue that insurance schemes should be complemented with social assistance. Community-based health insurance allows pooling in settings where institutional capacity is too weak to organize nationwide risk-pooling, especially in low-income countries, making insurance more affordable. In risk-sharing schemes, the insurance premium is unrelated to the likelihood that the beneficiary will fall ill and benefits are provided on the basis of need.

=== Social assistance ===
Social assistance schemes comprise programs designed to help the most vulnerable individuals ( i.e., those with no other means of support such as single parent households, victims of natural disasters or civil conflict, handicapped people, or the destitute poor), households and communities to meet a social floor and improve living standards. These programs consist of all forms of public action, government and non-government, that are designed to transfer resources, either cash or in-kind (e.g. food transfers), to eligible vulnerable and deprived persons. t. In the context of increasing climate-related shocks, Adaptive Social Protection has emerged as a strategy to help vulnerable populations adapt and build resilience to these events."Social assistance interventions may include:

- Welfare and social services to highly vulnerable groups such as the physically or mentally disabled, orphans, or substance abusers.
- Cash or in-kind transfers such as food stamps and family allowances. Unconditional cash transfers, for example, appear to be an effective intervention for reducing extreme poverty, while at the same time improving health and education outcomes.
- Temporary subsidies such as life-line tariffs, housing subsidies, or support of lower prices of staple food in times of crisis.

== Policy issues ==
=== Universalism vs. Targeting ===
There are two main schools of thought concerning scope of social protection. Universalism argues that each person, by merit of simply being a citizen should be entitled to benefits from social protection programs. Such a policy would avoid means-testing and any conditionalities such as work requirements. One of the greatest benefits to this policy perspective is social solidarity, since everyone contributes collaboratively to a system that everyone also benefits from. Social security is one such example. Moreover, economists have argued that universalism is an investment in human capital that aids the development of a nation as a whole. The World Bank's 2019 World Development Report The Changing Nature of Work considers social protection from this perspective, describing existing schemes around the world and presenting simulation data on the potential costs. Opponents would argue that universalism is cost-ineffective and unfairly distorts individual efforts. Such an argument points toward targeting as a better solution. In such a case, the question arises of who should be the target population that receives benefits from social programs.

=== Targeting income vs. capabilities ===
Net income is the simplest method of determining a needy population. Some states use a Guaranteed Minimum Income system, in which all members of a state receive sufficient income to live on, so long as they meet certain conditions. However, proponents of the capabilities approach argue that income is easier to misrepresent, and moreover, fails to target the root causal factors of poverty. Hence, they recommend targeting a minimum level of basic capabilities that will impact quality of life, such as institutional improvements like health and education. Policy examples might include a social floor.

=== Means of provision ===
Social protection is an expensive and difficult endeavor, by any means; the question remains how best to implement programs that effectively aid the people who need it the most. Currently, there are a number of mechanisms that provide social protection in various nations. These policies and instruments vary according to country context. In some nations, governments are strongly involved in the provision of social protection, following a developmentalism model, in which social protection is seen as a tool to promote economic growth. There are also nations which are characterized by dualism, in which there is state-provided protection for those who work in the formal sector, but little to no protection for those who work in the informal sector. Finally, there are nations in which the economy is largely agrarian, and a great majority of the population works in the informal economy. In those countries that have only residual social protection coverage and weak state capacity, social protection is mainly provided by non-governmental means such as kin, NGOs, and individual philanthropic donations.

=== Social protection floor ===
The social protection floor (SPF) is the first level of protection in a national social protection system. It is a basic set of social rights derived from human right treaties, including access to essential services (such as health, education, housing, water and sanitation, and others, as defined nationally) and social transfers, in cash or in kind, to guarantee economic security, food security, adequate nutrition and access to essential services.

As a result of the extreme inequality, social security schemes have been developed and implemented, through private and public initiatives, since the 1970s in Europe and subsequently in other parts of the world. However, the problem of poverty persists. According to the World Bank, over a billion people, or roughly one in six, live in extreme poverty (defined as a daily income not exceeding US$1) and 2.8 billion people live in poverty (daily income not over US$2).

To remedy this situation and promote socio-economic development, the United Nations Chief Executives Board for Coordination (UNCEB) coined the concept of the SPF. This framework aims to place governments as the central responsible actor for the promotion of four essential and universal guarantees, which would set the ground for a more comprehensive social protection system.

== National programs ==
=== Developmentalism ===
In South Korea and Taiwan, the government provides extensive support for public programs, following the developmentalism model, in which social protection is seen as a tool to promote economic growth.

=== Dualism ===
In Argentina, Brazil, India, China and Indonesia there is a dualist structure of protected formal sector workers with social protection levels similar to that of European countries with strong welfare states and marginalized informal sector workers with basic welfare benefits mostly coming from social assistance.

=== Agrarian-informal ===
In nations such as Tanzania and Ethiopia, governments struggle to provide adequate social protection, and citizens must instead depend on non-state actors and informal provisioning.

== Donor approaches ==
International donors and organizations have influenced social protection approaches in terms of both policy discourse and program design and implementation. Even though the World Bank and International Labour Organization (ILO) are the major donors and the lead organizations in the field, other organizations are also concerned with social protection.

The World Bank is a source of financial and technical assistance for developing countries. In order to identify social risks and potential responses, the World Bank developed a tool called "social risk management" (SRM). The SRM framework includes interventions that focus on managing risks before shocks occur. It is based on two assessments: (1) the poor are most exposed to diverse risks, and (2) the poor have the fewest tools to deal with these risks. The main elements of the SRM framework are:

- Risk reduction measures that focus on reducing risks in the labor market.
- Risk mitigation measures to deal with anticipated shock.
- Risk coping mechanisms to relieve the impact of risk after its occurred.

The Organisation for Economic Co-operation and Development (OECD) brings 30 democratic countries together to seek answers to common problems and coordinate domestic and international policies. The Development Assistance Committee (DAC) of the OECD is responsible for the Poverty Network (POVNET) that has become very influential on policy development. The DAC-POVNET focuses on the following areas:

- Poverty reduction
- Pro-poor growth
- People centered development
- Decent work

The International Labour Organization, which covers both issues of social security and labor protection, has been the United Nations agency responsible for setting norms and standards at work. Currently the ILO focuses, amongst others, on the following strategies:

- Extending social protection to all
- Promoting decent working conditions
- Providing programs for informal and migrant workers

== See also ==
- Social security
- Socialism
- Social programs in sub-Saharan Africa
- Welfare state
- Sustainable Development Goals
- Sustainable Development Goal 8
