= Social safety net =

Anti-poverty services provided by the state; NGO Advocacy

Adequacy of social safety net programs

A social safety net (SSN) consists of non-contributory assistance designed to improve the lives of vulnerable families and individuals experiencing poverty or destitution; much is governmental. Examples of such programs are: previously contributory social pensions, in-kind transfers like food assistance, conditional and unconditional cash transfers, fee waivers, public works, and school feeding programs.

== Definitions ==
There is no exact and unified definition of the concept of SSN. The World Bank has one of the widest definitions, but multiple definitions are used by different scholars, institutions, and organizations such as the International Labor Organization (ILO) and ESCAP. This lead some scholars to go so far as to hold that there is no point in using the term SSN as it is rarely used consistently and are instead advocating that the different components of SSN are used for analysis rather than the term itself.

== Economic rationale ==
Initially, social safety nets were intended for three purposes: Institutional reform, to make the adjustment programs feasible politically, and most importantly, poverty reduction.

The social safety net is a club good, which follows from it being excludable but non-rival.

Critics argue that SSN decreases the incentives to work, gives no graduation encouragement, tears down communal ties, and places a financial burden potentially too heavy to carry in the longer run. Furthermore, it has shown very difficult to decrease the SSN once it has been extended. Casper Hunnerup Dahl, a Danish economist, finds that there is a strong negative correlation between the generosity of OECD welfare states and the work ethic. The Swedish economist Martin Ljunge finds that an increasingly generous sick leave system leads younger Swedes to stay more at home than their older peers.

However, proponents argue that the case is quite the opposite, that even tiny transfers are used productively and often invested, be it in education, assets, social networks, or other income-generating activities.

== History ==
In the early 1990s the term "social safety net" surged in popularity, particularly among the Bretton Woods Institutions which used the term frequently in relation to their structural adjustment programs. These programs were intended to restructure the economies of developing countries, and these countries introduced social safety nets to reduce the impact of the programs on the poorest groups.

The increased importance of SSN over the last decades is also shown in UN's Sustainable Development Goals (SDG). One of the 17 goals is to eradicate poverty and among the sub-goals are implementing social protection systems and floors for everyone, and substantially reducing the potential impacts of environmental, economic and social shocks and disasters on the poor.

== Types of systems ==
The volume of spending varies vastly between countries. While wealthy countries in the OECD on average spend 2.7% of GDP on social safety nets, developing countries spend an average of 1.5%. There are also regional differences. European and Central Asian countries spend the highest share of their GDP followed in a diminishing spending manner by Sub-Saharan Africa, Latin America and Caribbean, East Asia and Pacific, Middle East and North Africa, and lastly South Asia. In addition, regions tend to favor different types of safety nets. Non-contributory pensions are widespread in East Asia, while Latin Americans often favor conditional cash transfers and South Asians public works.

André Sapir creates four groups of European social models. These are the Mediterranean countries (Spain, Portugal, Italy, Greece), Continental countries (Luxembourg, Germany, France, Belgium, Austria), Anglo-Saxon countries (United Kingdom and Ireland), and Nordic countries (Sweden, Finland, Denmark + Netherlands). Building on this, Boeri assesses the abilities of the different social models to reduce poverty and income inequality. His findings show that the reduction in inequality through redistribution is lowest in the Mediterranean countries with 35%, while the Nordic countries have the highest redistribution with a 42% reduction. In the middle one can find the two other models with 39%. Considering the numbers after taxes and transfers, the order of the countries alters a bit. When looking at how big a portion of the population has an income under the national poverty threshold the Nordic and Continental countries come out on top with only 12% living in poverty, while the Mediterranean and Anglo-Saxon countries come out last with 20%.

In South Africa there are grants for people unable to support themselves. Many of the grants are focused on children. Social services administer these grants.

== Effects ==
The World Bank has estimated that SSNs have helped around 36% of the poorest in the world escape extreme poverty, the number being 8% for relative poverty The contribution to narrowing the inequality gap has been even bigger. Here the SSN has helped reducing the absolute poverty gap with 45% whereas the relative poverty gap is reduced by 16%. Despite these numbers, the World Bank claim that the real numbers are probably even higher.

Still, the biggest challenge prevails in the poorest countries. Only 20% of the poorest inhabitants in low-income countries are included in SSNs. Consequently, the smallest decreases in poverty and inequality are found in these countries. There are a couple of probable reasons for this. First, a lot of surveys from low-income countries do not include specific SSN programs nor all the different programs that they have. Second, there is a lack of recent data regarding these issues compared to other country groups.

== See also ==
- Basic income guarantee
- Citizen's dividend
- Economic security
- Guaranteed minimum income
- Housing First
- Poor relief
- Social dividend
- Social insurance
- Social network
- Social protection floor
- Social security
- Social welfare provision
- Solidarity economy
- State pension
- Universal basic income
- Universal basic services
- Universal inheritance
- Welfare
