= Social protection floor =

First level of social protection

The social protection floor (SPF) is the first level of protection in a national social protection system. It is a basic set of social rights derived from human right treaties, including access to essential services (such as health, education, housing, water and sanitation, and others, as defined nationally) and social transfers, in cash or in kind, to guarantee economic security, food security, adequate nutrition and access to essential services.

As a result of the extreme inequality, social security schemes have been developed and implemented, through private and public initiatives, since the 1970s in Europe and subsequently in other parts of the world. However, the problem of poverty persists. According to the World Bank, over a billion people, or roughly one in six, live in extreme poverty (defined as a daily income not exceeding US$1) and 2.8 billion people live in poverty (daily income not over US$2).

To remedy this situation and promote socio-economic development, the United Nations Chief Executives Board for Coordination (UNCEB) coined the concept of the SPF. This framework aims to place governments as the central responsible actor for the promotion of four essential and universal guarantees, which would set the ground for a more comprehensive social protection system.

== Overview ==
The Social Protection Floor is a socio-economic development policy concept and a crisis management tool. It promotes a solid foundation for economic growth, provides a societal insurance against perpetuating poverty and mitigates the effects of economic shocks and crisis.

The Universal Declaration of Human Rights, the International Covenant on Economic, Social and Cultural Rights and the International Labour Organization Conventions are international instruments that have recognized these essential social rights and have been used as the legal basis to support the Social Protection Floor.

Founded on a rights-based approach, the Social Protection Floor encourages countries to aim towards a universal standard of social protection coverage. Since the context of each country differs in terms of institutional capacity, political ideologies, financial resources, economic structure and cultural values, each floor is defined by individual countries.

Building from past social protection programs, the SPF promotes a more coordinated design and implementation of social and labour policies in order to guarantee a country-defined basic set of social rights, services and facilities that every person should enjoy, which could be granted through:

- cash transfers such as a social pension;
- unconditional cash transfers;
- conditional cash transfers;
- universal access to health care services;
- food-based programs, as well as food stamps, vouchers and coupons;
- school supplies and uniforms;
- vocational and training programs for the unemployed;
- price subsidies for food, electricity, housing, or other public service; and
- other programs.

To insure continuity and sustainability, these strategies build on existing social protection mechanisms and include a mix of contributory and non-contributory, targeted and universal, public and private instruments – depending on the social, economic and political context. Countries are also encouraged to develop higher levels of social protection in line with their needs, preferences, and financial capacities.

A global coalition of United Nations agencies, international NGOs, development banks, bilateral organization and other development partners, the Social Protection Floor – Initiative Coalition (SPF-I Coalition), has been created to support countries with the establishment, expansion and edification of their national social protection floors.

== Strategy for the extension ==
The ultimate objective of the Social Protection Floor approach is to build a solid basis that would allow higher levels of protection, than simply the ground floor level. As economies grow and fiscal space is created, social protection systems can and should move up the Social Protection Floor staircase, extending the scope, level and quality of benefits and services provided.

Within this strategy, the International Labour Organization (ILO) has suggested a two-dimensional approach to develop the SPF including :

- a horizontal coverage, or the Social Protection Floor, providing access to essential health care for all, income security for children, assistance to the unemployed, underemployed and poor, and income security for the elderly and disabled; and
- a vertical coverage building on the first floor and providing more extensive and comprehensive social protection coverage.

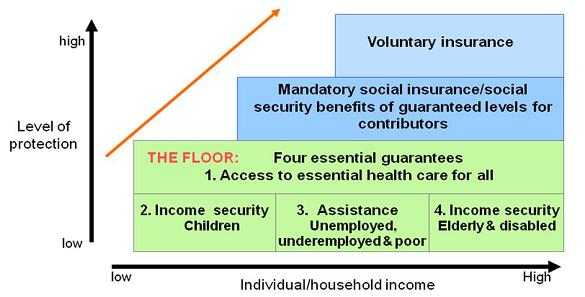

This concept takes into consideration the national constraints of countries, while promoting a basic universal level of social protection to all. The gradual introduction and implementation of the social protection guarantees is essential for the development and sustainability of the system. In this way, countries do not lose sight of the overall objective of achieving comprehensive social protection for all; and they are able to assess and be constantly aware of the opportunity cost in terms of other guarantees that are put on hold when taking a decision on priorities. Formulating a package of guarantees as a floor should thus lead to rational cost/benefit-based policy decisions.

== Affordability ==
Ensuring a Social Protection Floor for the entire world population represents a considerable challenge, but experiences from countries all over the world and calculations by various UN agencies, including UNICEF, show that a basic floor of social transfers is globally affordable at virtually any stage of economic development.

In 2008, the International Labour Organization published a cost-estimation study of 12 low-income countries in Africa and Asia that showed that the initial gross annual cost of a hypothetical basic social security package – that excluded access to essential health case because it is already to some extent financed – was projected to lie between 2.2 and 5.7 per cent of GDP in 2010.

There are many ways to attain affordable SFP coverage in middle- or low-income countries. While some countries seek to extend social insurance and combine it with social assistance, others subsidize social insurance coverage for the poor to enable them to enjoy participation in the general schemes, and still others seek to establish tax-financed universal schemes or conditional social transfer schemes. Each approach has its advantages and its limitations, depending on national values, past experience and institutional frameworks.

The core challenge for financing the basic social security guarantees remains that of securing the necessary fiscal space. For this reason, tax reforms may be necessary to increase fiscal resources, but also to enhance transparency, effectiveness and efficiency in tax collection.

In addition, measures may be required to maximize the administrative capacity to deliver benefits efficiently and inform the population about programmes. Evidence shows that good governance of social policies and programme is essential for efficient service delivery, monitoring, evaluation and financial management.

== The Coalition of the Social Protection Floor – Initiative ==
The Social Protection Floor Initiative (SPF-I) is a joint UN effort to build a global coalition of United Nations agencies, international NGOs, development banks, bilateral organisations and other development partners that are committed to collaborating at national, regional and global levels to support countries committed to building national social protection floors for their population.

The SPF-I was launched in April 2009 as one of the nine UN Chief Executives Board's crisis initiatives – responding to repeated demands from member states for better coordinated technical, logistical and financial assistance from UN system agencies in times of crisis. The activities of the initiative are open for participation to all organisations that want to support the cause of strengthening social protection for all in need. Organizations which are involved include: ILO, World Health Organization, FAO, International Monetary Fund, OHCHR, UN Regional Commissions, UNAIDS, UN-DESA, UNDP, UNESCO, FAO, UNFPA, UN-HABITAT, UNHCR, UNICEF, UNODC, UNRWA, World Food Programme, WMO, World Bank, ADB, BMZ, the UK's Department for International Development (DFID), Helpage International, Save the Children, ICSW, GIZ, ESN, the Ministry of Foreign Affairs in Finland, French International Health and Social Protection Agency, GIPS, and others.

Pulling away from traditional top-down implementation, SPFs are country-led and developed based on the existing framework of county-specific social protection systems, institutional and administrative structures, economic constraints, fiscal space, political dynamics and social policy needs, objectives and priorities. The Coalition members of the SPF-I play a consultative role and among other activities:

- are engaged in advocacy initiatives to integrate SPFs into development strategies;
- offer technical and financial support to national SPF task forces;
- collect evidence, document experiences and develop;
- provide capacity building and training programmes together with the International Training Centre (ITC) in Turin and partner universities, including: the University of Maastricht, the Netherlands, the University of Lausanne, Switzerland and the University of Mauritius; and
- support South-South and triangular cooperation through several initiatives.

== See also ==
- Citizen's dividend
- Guaranteed minimum income
- Involuntary unemployment
- Social dividend
- Social health insurance
- Social protection
- Social safety net
- Social security
- Social welfare provision
- Welfare culture
- Welfare state
