= Second Thatcher ministry =

Government of the United Kingdom from 1983 to 1987

- Cabinet of the United Kingdom
- 1983–1987
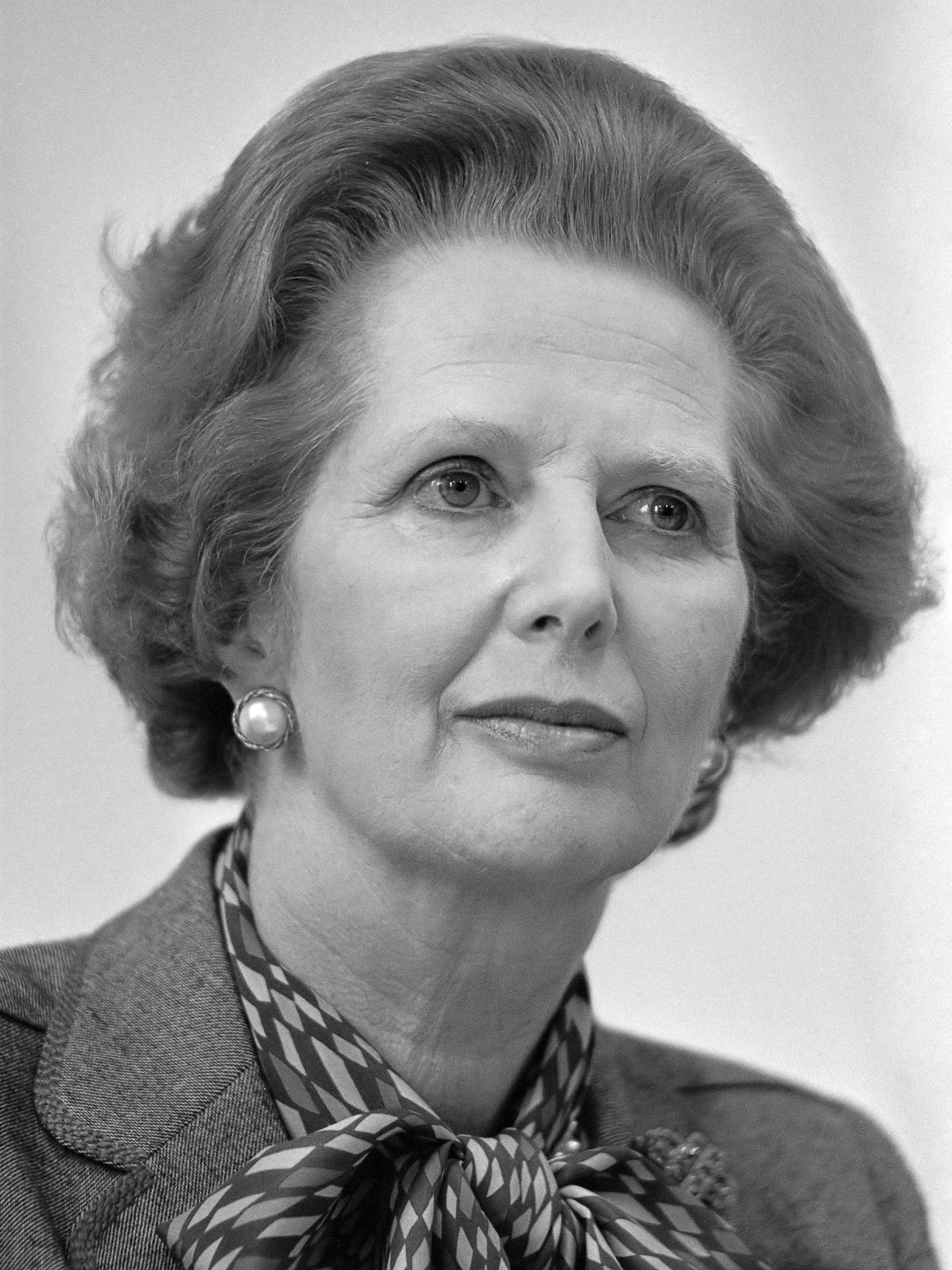
- Thatcher in 1983
- Date formed: 10 June 1983
- Date dissolved: 12 June 1987

People and organisations
- Monarch: Elizabeth II
- Prime Minister: Margaret Thatcher
- Prime Minister's history: Premiership of Margaret Thatcher
- Deputy Prime Minister: (Note: William Whitelaw did not officially hold the title of Deputy Prime Minister (Hennessy 2001, p. 405). He only served as Deputy Leader of the Conservative Party.)
- Total no. of members: 219 appointments
- Member party: Conservative Party
- Status in legislature: Majority
- Opposition cabinet: Foot shadow cabinet; Kinnock shadow cabinet
- Opposition party: Labour Party
- Opposition leader: Michael Foot (1983); Neil Kinnock (1983–1987)

History
- Election: 1983 general election
- Outgoing election: 1987 general election
- Legislature terms: 49th UK Parliament
- Budgets: 1984 budget; 1985 budget; 1986 budget; 1987 budget
- Predecessor: First Thatcher ministry
- Successor: Third Thatcher ministry

Margaret Thatcher was Prime Minister of the United Kingdom from 4 May 1979 to 28 November 1990, during which time she led a Conservative majority government. She was the first woman to hold that office. During her premiership, Thatcher moved to liberalise the British economy through deregulation, privatisation, and the promotion of entrepreneurialism.

This article details the second Thatcher ministry which she led at the invitation of Queen Elizabeth II from 1983 to 1987.

== Formation ==
The Conservative government was re-elected in June 1983 with a majority of 144 seats, with Labour in opposition having a mere 209 seats after its worst postwar electoral performance, seeing off a close challenge from the SDP–Liberal Alliance who came close to them on votes though not with seats.

With inflation firmly under control and union reforms contributing towards the lowest level of strikes since the early 1950s, the Conservatives were now faced with the challenge of reducing unemployment from a record high of 3,200,000.

March 1984 saw the beginning of a miners' strike which would last for 12 months and divide the country as Mrs Thatcher announced extensive pit closures which would ultimately cost thousands of miners their jobs, while the remaining pits were set to be privatised in the proposed sell-off of the National Coal Board. Privatisation of utilities and heavy industry was becoming a key symbol of Thatcherism, with the likes of British Telecom also transferring from public to private ownership.

Michael Foot had stepped down as Labour leader following the 1983 general election. The man elected by Labour with the task of getting them back into government was Neil Kinnock. He proved himself as a fierce rival to Thatcher, and more than once during the 1983–87 parliament, the opinion polls showed Labour (and very occasionally the Alliance) in the lead, although a huge swing was required at a general election if the Conservative government was to be ousted.

The challenge from the SDP–Liberal Alliance was becoming weaker, despite their brief lead of the opinion polls during 1985.

However, economic growth following recession had been re-established by the beginning of this parliament and by 1987 the economy was well on the road to recovery. However, although unemployment which had peaked at nearly 3,300,000 during 1984 remained above 3,000,000 by the turn of 1987, with the opinion polls all showing a Tory lead, it was anticipated that Thatcher would call the next general election earlier than the deadline of June 1988.

== Fate ==
A general election was called for 11 June 1987, and the Conservatives triumphed for the third election in succession. Labour, on the other hand, achieved a better election result than it had the previous time (and also managed to reduce the Conservative majority), with more than 30% of the vote, while the SDP–Liberal Alliance floundered and was soon disbanded as the Social Democratic Party and Liberal Party merged to form the Social and Liberal Democrats (who soon became the Liberal Democrats).

== Cabinet ==
=== June 1983 to June 1987 ===
| Office | Name |
|---|---|
| Prime Minister; First Lord of the Treasury; Minister for the Civil Service | Margaret Thatcher |
| Leader of the House of Lords; Lord President of the Council | William Whitelaw |
| Lord High Chancellor of Great Britain | Quintin Hogg, Baron Hailsham of St Marylebone |
| Leader of the House of Commons; Lord Keeper of the Privy Seal | John Biffen |
| Chancellor of the Exchequer | Nigel Lawson |
| Chief Secretary to the Treasury | Peter Rees |
| Secretary of State for Foreign and Commonwealth Affairs | Sir Geoffrey Howe |
| Secretary of State for the Home Department | Leon Brittan |
| Minister of Agriculture, Fisheries and Food | Michael Jopling |
| Secretary of State for Defence | Michael Heseltine |
| Secretary of State for Education and Science | Sir Keith Joseph |
| Secretary of State for Employment | Norman Tebbit |
| Secretary of State for Energy | Peter Walker |
| Secretary of State for the Environment | Patrick Jenkin |
| Secretary of State for Health | Norman Fowler |
| Chancellor of the Duchy of Lancaster | Arthur Cockfield, Baron Cockfield |
| Secretary of State for Northern Ireland | Jim Prior |
| Secretary of State for Scotland | George Younger |
| Secretary of State for Trade and Industry; President of the Board of Trade | Cecil Parkinson |
| Secretary of State for Transport | Tom King |
| Secretary of State for Wales | Nicholas Edwards |
| Chief Whip of the House of Commons; Parliamentary Secretary to the Treasury | John Wakeham |

==== Changes ====
- October 1983 –
  - Tom King succeeded Norman Tebbit as Secretary of State for Employment.
  - Norman Tebbit succeeded Cecil Parkinson as Secretary of State for Trade and Industry.
  - Nicholas Ridley succeeded Tom King as Secretary of State for Transport.
- September 1984 –
  - Grey Gowrie succeeded Lord Cockfield as Chancellor of the Duchy of Lancaster.
  - Douglas Hurd succeeded Jim Prior as Secretary of State for Northern Ireland.
  - David Young, Baron Young of Graffham enters the Cabinet as Minister without Portfolio.
- September 1985 –
  - Lord Young of Graffham succeeded Tom King as Secretary of State for Employment.
  - Kenneth Baker succeeded Patrick Jenkin as Secretary of State for the Environment.
  - Norman Tebbit succeeded Earl of Gowrie as Chancellor of the Duchy of Lancaster.
  - Tom King succeeded Douglas Hurd as Secretary of State for Northern Ireland.
  - Kenneth Clarke enters the Cabinet as Paymaster-General.
  - Leon Brittan succeeded Norman Tebbit as Secretary of State for Trade and Industry.
  - John MacGregor succeeded Peter Rees as Chief Secretary to the Treasury.
  - Douglas Hurd succeeded Leon Brittan as Home Secretary.
- early January 1986 – Malcolm Rifkind succeeded George Younger as Secretary of State for Scotland. Younger succeeded Michael Heseltine as Secretary of State for Defence.
- late January 1986 – Paul Channon succeeded Leon Brittan as Secretary of State for Trade and Industry.
- May 1986 –
  - Nicholas Ridley succeeded Kenneth Baker as Secretary of State for the Environment. John Moore succeeded Ridley as Secretary of State for Transport.
  - Kenneth Baker succeeded Keith Joseph as Secretary of State for Education and Science.

== List of ministers ==
Members of the Cabinet are in bold face.

| Office | Name | Dates | Notes |
|---|---|---|---|
| Prime Minister; First Lord of the Treasury; Minister for the Civil Service | **Margaret Thatcher** | June 1983 | |
| Leader of the House of Lords; Lord President of the Council | **William Whitelaw** | June 1983 – June 1987 | |
| Lord High Chancellor of Great Britain | **Quintin Hogg, Baron Hailsham of St Marylebone** | June 1983 | |
| Leader of the House of Lords; Lord President of the Council | **William Whitelaw** | 11 June 1983 | also Deputy Leader of the Conservative Party |
| Minister of State for the Privy Council Office | Grey Gowrie | 11 June 1983 – 11 September 1984 | |
| Minister of State for the Privy Council Office | Richard Luce | 2 September 1985 – June 1987 | |
| Leader of the House of Commons; Lord Keeper of the Privy Seal | **John Biffen** | 11 June 1983 | |
| Chancellor of the Exchequer | **Nigel Lawson** | 11 June 1983 | |
| Chief Secretary to the Treasury | **Peter Rees** | 11 June 1983 | |
| Chief Secretary to the Treasury | **John MacGregor** | 2 September 1985 | |
| Minister of State for Treasury | Barney Hayhoe | June 1983 – 2 September 1985 | |
| Minister of State for Treasury | Ian Gow | 2 September 1985 – 19 November 1985 | |
| Minister of State for Treasury | Peter Brooke | 19 November 1985 – 13 June 1987 | |
| Parliamentary Secretary to the Treasury | John Wakeham | 11 June 1983 | |
| Financial Secretary to the Treasury | Nicholas Ridley | 13 June 1983 | |
| Financial Secretary to the Treasury | John Moore | 18 October 1983 | |
| Financial Secretary to the Treasury | Norman Lamont | 21 May 1986 | |
| Economic Secretary to the Treasury | John Moore | 13 June 1983 | |
| Economic Secretary to the Treasury | Ian Stewart | 19 October 1983 | |
| Lords Commissioners of the Treasury | Alastair Goodlad | June 1983 – 10 September 1984 | |
| Lords Commissioners of the Treasury | Donald Thompson | June 1983 – 10 September 1986 | |
| Lords Commissioners of the Treasury | David Hunt | June 1983 – 10 September 1984 | |
| Lords Commissioners of the Treasury | Ian Lang | 11 June 1983 – 1 February 1986 | |
| Lords Commissioners of the Treasury | Tristan Garel-Jones | 11 June 1983 – 16 October 1986 | |
| Lords Commissioners of the Treasury | John Major | 3 October 1984 – 1 November 1985 | |
| Lords Commissioners of the Treasury | Archie Hamilton | 3 October 1984 – 10 September 1986 | |
| Lords Commissioners of the Treasury | Tim Sainsbury | 7 October 1985 – 23 June 1987 | |
| Lords Commissioners of the Treasury | Michael Neubert | 10 February 1986 – June 1987 | |
| Lords Commissioners of the Treasury | Peter Lloyd | 16 October 1986 – June 1987 | |
| Lords Commissioners of the Treasury | Mark Lennox-Boyd | 16 October 1986 – June 1987 | |
| Lords Commissioners of the Treasury | Tony Durant | 16 October 1986 – June 1987 | |
| Assistant Whips | Archie Hamilton | June 1983 – October 1984 | |
| Assistant Whips | John Major | January 1983 – October 1984 | |
| Assistant Whips | Douglas Hogg | February 1983 – October 1984 | |
| Assistant Whips | Michael Neubert | June 1983 – February 1986 | |
| Assistant Whips | Tim Sainsbury | June 1983 – October 1985 | |
| Assistant Whips | Tony Durant | October 1984 – October 1986 | |
| Assistant Whips | Peter Lloyd | October 1984 – October 1986 | |
| Assistant Whips | Mark Lennox-Boyd | October 1984 – October 1986 | |
| Assistant Whips | Francis Maude | October 1985 – June 1987 | |
| Assistant Whips | Gerald Malone | February 1986 – June 1987 | |
| Assistant Whips | David Lightbown | October 1986 – June 1987 | |
| Assistant Whips | Michael Portillo | October 1986 – June 1987 | |
| Assistant Whips | Richard Ryder | October 1986 – June 1987 | |
| Foreign Secretary | **Geoffrey Howe** | 11 June 1983 | |
| Minister of State for Foreign and Commonwealth Affairs | Timothy Raison | June 1983 – 10 September 1986 | also Minister of Overseas Development |
| Minister of State for Foreign and Commonwealth Affairs | Richard Luce | 11 June 1983 – 2 September 1985 | |
| Minister of State for Foreign and Commonwealth Affairs | Malcolm Rifkind | 13 June 1983 – 11 January 1986 | |
| Minister of State for Foreign and Commonwealth Affairs | Janet Young, Baroness Young | 13 June 1983 – 13 June 1987 | |
| Minister of State for Foreign and Commonwealth Affairs | Tim Renton | 2 September 1985 – 13 June 1987 | |
| Minister of State for Foreign and Commonwealth Affairs | Lynda Chalker | 11 January 1986 – June 1987 | |
| Minister of State for Foreign and Commonwealth Affairs | Chris Patten | 10 September 1986 – June 1987 | |
| Under-Secretary of State for Foreign and Commonwealth Affairs | Ray Whitney | 13 June 1983 | |
| Under-Secretary of State for Foreign and Commonwealth Affairs | Tim Renton | 11 September 1984 | |
| Under-Secretary of State for Foreign and Commonwealth Affairs | Timothy Eggar | 2 September 1985 | |
| Minister for Overseas Development | Timothy Raison | June 1983 | |
| Minister for Overseas Development | Chris Patten | 10 September 1986 | also Minister of State for Foreign and Commonwealth Affairs |
| Home Secretary | **Leon Brittan** | 11 June 1983 | |
| Home Secretary | **Douglas Hurd** | 2 September 1985 | |
| Minister of State for Home Affairs | David Waddington | June 1983 – 13 June 1987 | |
| Minister of State for Home Affairs | Douglas Hurd | June 1983 – September 1984 | |
| Minister of State for Home Affairs | Rodney Elton, 2nd Baron Elton | 11 September 1984 – 25 March 1985 | |
| Minister of State for Home Affairs | Giles Shaw | 11 September 1984 – 10 September 1986 | |
| Minister of State for Home Affairs | David Mellor | 10 September 1986 – 13 June 1987 | |
| Minister of State for Home Affairs | Malcolm Sinclair, 20th Earl of Caithness | 10 September 1986 – June 1987 | |
| Under-Secretary of State for Home Affairs | Rodney Elton, 2nd Baron Elton | June 1983 – 11 September 1984 | |
| Under-Secretary of State for Home Affairs | David Mellor | June 1983 – 10 September 1986 | |
| Under-Secretary of State for Home Affairs | Simon Arthur, 4th Baron Glenarthur | 27 March 1984 – 10 September 1986 | |
| Under-Secretary of State for Home Affairs | Douglas Hogg | 10 September 1986 – June 1987 | |
| Minister of Agriculture, Fisheries and Food | **Michael Jopling** | 11 June 1983 | |
| Minister of State for Agriculture, Fisheries and Food | John MacGregor | 13 June 1983 – 2 September 1985 | |
| Minister of State for Agriculture, Fisheries and Food | John Ganzoni, 2nd Baron Belstead | 13 June 1983 – 13 June 1987 | |
| Minister of State for Agriculture, Fisheries and Food | John Gummer | 2 September 1985 – June 1987 | |
| Under-Secretary of State for Agriculture, Fisheries and Food | Peggy Fenner | June 1983 – 10 September 1986 | |
| Under-Secretary of State for Agriculture, Fisheries and Food | Donald Thompson | 10 September 1986 – June 1987 | |
| Minister for the Arts | **Grey Gowrie** | 13 June 1983 | |
| Minister for the Arts | Richard Luce | 2 September 1985 | |
| Secretary of State for Defence | **Michael Heseltine** | June 1983 | |
| Secretary of State for Defence | **George Younger** | 9 January 1986 | |
| Minister of State for the Armed Forces | John Stanley | 13 June 1983 | |
| Minister of State for Defence Procurement | Geoffrey Pattie | 13 June 1983 | |
| Minister of State for Defence Procurement | Hon. Adam Butler | 11 September 1984 | |
| Minister of State for Defence Procurement | Norman Lamont | 2 September 1985 | |
| Minister of State for Defence Procurement | David Trefgarne, 2nd Baron Trefgarne | 21 May 1986 | |
| Minister of State for Defence Support | David Trefgarne, 2nd Baron Trefgarne | 2 September 1985 – 21 May 1986 | |
| Under-Secretary of State for the Armed Forces | David Trefgarne, 2nd Baron Trefgarne | 13 June 1983 – 1 September 1985 | |
| Under-Secretary of State for the Armed Forces | Roger Freeman | 21 May 1986 – June 1987 | |
| Under-Secretary of State for Defence Procurement | Ian Stewart | June 1983 – 18 October 1983 | |
| Under-Secretary of State for Defence Procurement | John Lee | 18 October 1983 – 10 September 1986 | |
| Under-Secretary of State for Defence Procurement | Archie Hamilton | 10 September 1986 – 13 June 1987 | |
| Secretary of State for Education | **Sir Keith Joseph, 2nd Baronet** | June 1983 | |
| Secretary of State for Education | **Kenneth Baker** | 21 May 1986 | |
| Minister of State, Education and Science | Chris Patten | 5 September 1985 – 10 September 1986 | |
| Minister of State, Education and Science | Angela Rumbold | 10 September 1986 – June 1987 | |
| Under-Secretary of State, Education and Science | Peter Brooke | 13 June 1983 – 19 November 1985 | |
| Under-Secretary of State, Education and Science | Bob Dunn | 13 June 1983 – June 1987 | |
| Under-Secretary of State, Education and Science | George Walden | 19 November 1985 – 13 June 1987 | |
| Secretary of State for Employment | **Norman Tebbit** | June 1983 | |
| Secretary of State for Employment | **Tom King** | 16 October 1983 | |
| Secretary of State for Employment | **David Young, Baron Young of Graffham** | 2 September 1985 | |
| Minister of State, Employment | Peter Morrison | 13 June 1983 – 2 September 1985 | |
| Minister of State, Employment | John Gummer | 18 October 1983 – 11 September 1984 | |
| Minister of State, Employment | **Kenneth Clarke** | 2 September 1985 – 13 June 1987 | Also Paymaster General |
| Under-Secretary of State, Employment | John Gummer | June 1983 – 18 October 1983 | |
| Under-Secretary of State, Employment | Alan Clark | 13 June 1983 – 24 January 1986 | |
| Under-Secretary of State, Employment | Peter Bottomley | 11 September 1984 – 23 January 1986 | |
| Under-Secretary of State, Employment | David Trippier | 2 September 1985 – 13 June 1987 | |
| Under-Secretary of State, Employment | Ian Lang | 31 January 1986 – 10 September 1986 | |
| Under-Secretary of State, Employment | John Lee | 10 September 1986 – June 1987 | |
| Secretary of State for Energy | **Peter Walker** | 11 June 1983 | |
| Minister of State, Energy | Alick Buchanan-Smith | 13 June 1983 | |
| Under-Secretary of State, Energy | Nicholas Eden, 2nd Earl of Avon | June 1983 – 11 September 1984 | |
| Under-Secretary of State, Energy | Giles Shaw | 13 June 1983 – 11 September 1984 | |
| Under-Secretary of State, Energy | David Hunt | 11 September 1984 – 13 June 1987 | |
| Under-Secretary of State, Energy | Alastair Goodlad | 11 September 1984 – 13 June 1987 | |
| Secretary of State for the Environment | **Patrick Jenkin** | 11 June 1983 | |
| Secretary of State for the Environment | **Kenneth Baker** | 23 September 1985 | |
| Secretary of State for the Environment | **Nicholas Ridley** | 21 May 1986 | |
| Minister of State for Local Government | Irwin Bellow, Baron Bellwin | June 1983 | |
| Minister of State for Local Government | Kenneth Baker | 11 September 1984 | |
| Minister of State for Local Government | William Waldegrave | 2 September 1985 | |
| Minister of State for Local Government | Rhodes Boyson | 10 September 1986 | |
| Minister of State for Housing | Ian Gow | 13 June 1983 | |
| Minister of State for Housing | John Patten | 2 September 1985 | |
| Minister of State, Environment | Rodney Elton, 2nd Baron Elton | 27 March 1985 – 10 September 1986 | |
| Minister of State, Environment | William Waldegrave | 10 September 1986 – 13 June 1987 | |
| Under-Secretary of State for Sport | Neil Macfarlane | June 1983 – 2 September 1985 | |
| Under-Secretary of State for Sport | Richard Tracey | 7 September 1985 – 13 June 1987 | |
| Under-Secretary of State, Environment | Sir George Young, 6th Baronet | June 1981 – 10 September 1986 | |
| Under-Secretary of State, Environment | William Waldegrave | 13 June 1983 – 2 September 1985 | |
| Under-Secretary of State, Environment | Nicholas Eden, 2nd Earl of Avon | 11 September 1984 – 27 March 1985 | |
| Under-Secretary of State, Environment | Angela Rumbold | 2 September 1985 – 10 September 1986 | |
| Under-Secretary of State, Environment | Roger Bootle-Wilbraham, 7th Baron Skelmersdale | 10 September 1986 – 13 June 1987 | |
| Under-Secretary of State, Environment | Christopher Chope | 10 September 1986 – June 1987 | |
| Secretary of State for Social Services | **Norman Fowler** | June 1983 | |
| Minister of State, Health | Kenneth Clarke | June 1983 | |
| Minister of State, Health | Barney Hayhoe | 2 September 1985 | |
| Minister of State, Health | Tony Newton | 10 September 1986 | |
| Under-Secretary of State, Health and Social Security | Tony Newton | June 1983 – 11 September 1984 | |
| Under-Secretary of State, Health and Social Security | John Patten | 14 June 1983 – 2 September 1985 | |
| Under-Secretary of State, Health and Social Security | Simon Arthur, 4th Baron Glenarthur | 14 June 1983 – 26 March 1985 | |
| Under-Secretary of State, Health and Social Security | Ray Whitney | 11 September 1984 – 10 September 1986 | |
| Under-Secretary of State, Health and Social Security | Jean Barker, Baroness Trumpington | 30 March 1985 – 13 June 1987 | |
| Under-Secretary of State, Health and Social Security | John Major | 2 September 1985 – 10 September 1986 | |
| Under-Secretary of State, Health and Social Security | Nicholas Lyell | 10 September 1986 – 13 June 1987 | |
| Under-Secretary of State, Health and Social Security | Edwina Currie | 10 September 1986 – June 1987 | |
| Minister of State, Social Security | Rhodes Boyson | 12 June 1983 – 11 September 1984 | |
| Minister of State, Social Security | Tony Newton | 11 September 1984 – 10 September 1986 | |
| Minister of State, Social Security | John Major | 10 September 1986 – 13 June 1987 | |
| Minister of State, Industry and Information Technology | Kenneth Baker | June 1983 | under Office of Trade and Industry from 12 June 1983 |
| Minister of State, Industry and Information Technology | Geoffrey Pattie | 11 September 1984 | Office abolished 13 June 1987 |
| Chancellor of the Duchy of Lancaster | **Arthur Cockfield, Baron Cockfield** | 11 June 1983 | |
| Chancellor of the Duchy of Lancaster | **Grey Gowrie** | 11 September 1984 | |
| Chancellor of the Duchy of Lancaster | **Norman Tebbit** | 3 September 1985 | |
| Secretary of State for Northern Ireland | **Jim Prior** | June 1983 | |
| Secretary of State for Northern Ireland | **Douglas Hurd** | 11 September 1984 | |
| Secretary of State for Northern Ireland | **Tom King** | 3 September 1985 | |
| Minister of State, Northern Ireland | Hon. Adam Butler | June 1983 – 11 September 1984 | |
| Minister of State, Northern Ireland | Grey Gowrie | June 1983 – September 1983 | |
| Minister of State, Northern Ireland | William Murray, 8th Earl of Mansfield and Mansfield | 13 June 1983 – 12 April 1984 | |
| Minister of State, Northern Ireland | Rhodes Boyson | 11 September 1984 – 10 September 1986 | |
| Minister of State, Northern Ireland | Nicholas Scott | 10 September 1986 – 13 June 1987 | |
| Under-Secretary of State, Northern Ireland | Nicholas Scott | June 1983 – 11 September 1986 | |
| Under-Secretary of State, Northern Ireland | Chris Patten | 14 June 1983 – 2 September 1985 | |
| Under-Secretary of State, Northern Ireland | Charles Lyell, 3rd Baron Lyell | 12 April 1984 – June 1987 | |
| Under-Secretary of State, Northern Ireland | Richard Needham | 3 September 1985 – June 1987 | |
| Under-Secretary of State, Northern Ireland | Peter Viggers | 10 September 1986 – June 1987 | |
| Under-Secretary of State, Northern Ireland | Brian Mawhinney | 10 September 1986 – June 1987 | |
| Paymaster General | Vacant | 11 June 1983 | |
| Paymaster General | John Gummer | 11 September 1984 | |
| Paymaster General | **Kenneth Clarke** | 2 September 1985 | also Minister of State, Employment |
| Minister without Portfolio | **David Young, Baron Young of Graffham** | 11 September 1984 – 3 September 1985 | |
| Secretary of State for Scotland | **George Younger** | June 1983 | |
| Secretary of State for Scotland | **Malcolm Rifkind** | 11 January 1986 | |
| Minister of State for Scotland | Hamish Gray, Baron Gray of Contin | 13 June 1983 – 11 September 1986 | |
| Minister of State for Scotland | Simon Arthur, 4th Baron Glenarthur | 10 September 1986 – 13 June 1987 | |
| Under-Secretary of State for Scotland | Allan Stewart | June 1983 – 10 September 1986 | |
| Under-Secretary of State for Scotland | John MacKay | June 1983 – 14 June 1987 | |
| Under-Secretary of State for Scotland | Michael Ancram | 13 June 1983 – 14 June 1987 | |
| Under-Secretary of State for Scotland | Ian Lang | 10 September 1986 – 13 June 1987 | |
| Minister of State for Trade | Paul Channon | 13 June 1983 | under Office of Trade and Industry |
| Minister of State for Trade | Alan Clark | 24 January 1986 | |
| Secretary of State for Trade and Industry | **Cecil Parkinson** | 12 June 1983 | |
| Secretary of State for Trade and Industry | **Norman Tebbit** | 16 October 1983 | |
| Secretary of State for Trade and Industry | **Leon Brittan** | 2 September 1985 | |
| Secretary of State for Trade and Industry | **Paul Channon** | 24 January 1986 | |
| Minister of State for Trade and Industry | Norman Lamont | 13 June 1983 – 2 September 1985 | |
| Minister of State for Trade and Industry | Peter Morrison | 2 September 1985 – 10 September 1986 | |
| Minister of State for Trade and Industry | Giles Shaw | 10 September 1986 – 13 June 1987 | |
| Under-Secretary of State for Trade and Industry | John Butcher | 14 June 1983 – June 1987 | |
| Under-Secretary of State for Trade and Industry | Alexander Fletcher | 14 June 1983 – 2 September 1985 | |
| Under-Secretary of State for Trade and Industry | David Trippier | 14 June 1983 – 2 September 1985 | |
| Under-Secretary of State for Trade and Industry | Michael Lucas, 2nd Baron Lucas of Chilworth | 11 September 1984 – 13 June 1987 | |
| Under-Secretary of State for Trade and Industry | Michael Howard | 2 September 1985 – 13 June 1987 | |
| Secretary of State for Transport | **Tom King** | 11 June 1983 | |
| Secretary of State for Transport | **Nicholas Ridley** | 16 October 1983 | |
| Secretary of State for Transport | **John Moore** | 21 May 1986 | |
| Minister of State, Transport | Lynda Chalker | 18 October 1983 – 10 January 1986 | |
| Minister of State, Transport | David Mitchell | 23 January 1986 – June 1987 | |
| Under-Secretary of State for Transport | Lynda Chalker | June 1983 – 18 October 1983 | |
| Under-Secretary of State for Transport | David Mitchell | 11 June 1983 – 23 January 1986 | |
| Under-Secretary of State for Transport | Michael Spicer | 11 September 1984 – 13 June 1987 | |
| Under-Secretary of State for Transport | Malcolm Sinclair, 20th Earl of Caithness | 2 September 1985 – 10 September 1986 | |
| Under-Secretary of State for Transport | Peter Bottomley | 23 January 1986 – June 1987 | |
| Under-Secretary of State for Transport | Ivon Moore-Brabazon, 3rd Baron Brabazon of Tara | 10 September 1986 – June 1987 | |
| Secretary of State for Wales | **Nicholas Edwards** | June 1983 | |
| Minister of State for Wales | John Stradling Thomas | June 1983 – 2 September 1985 | |
| Under-Secretary of State for Wales | Wyn Roberts | June 1983 – 13 June 1987 | |
| Under-Secretary of State for Wales | Mark Robinson | 3 October 1985 – 15 June 1987 | |
| Attorney General | Michael Havers | June 1983 | |
| Solicitor General | Sir Patrick Mayhew | 13 June 1983 | |
| Lord Advocate | James Mackay, Baron Mackay of Clashfern | June 1983 | |
| Lord Advocate | Kenneth Cameron, Baron Cameron of Lochbroom | 16 May 1984 | |
| Solicitor General for Scotland | Peter Fraser | June 1983 | |
| Treasurer of the Household | John Cope | 11 June 1983 | |
| Comptroller of the Household | Carol Mather | June 1983 | |
| Comptroller of the Household | Robert Boscawen | 16 October 1986 | |
| Vice-Chamberlain of the Household | Robert Boscawen | June 1983 | |
| Vice-Chamberlain of the Household | Tristan Garel-Jones | 16 October 1986 | |
| Captain of the Gentlemen-at-Arms | Bertram Bowyer, 2nd Baron Denham | June 1983 | |
| Captain of the Yeomen of the Guard | David Cunliffe-Lister, 2nd Earl of Swinton | June 1983 | |
| Captain of the Yeomen of the Guard | Andrew Davidson, 2nd Viscount Davidson | 10 September 1986 | |
| Lords-in-Waiting | Richard Long, 4th Viscount Long | June 1983 – 2 May 1997 | |
| Lords-in-Waiting | Charles Lyell, 3rd Baron Lyell | June 1983 – 12 April 1984 | |
| Lords-in-Waiting | Roger Bootle-Wilbraham, 7th Baron Skelmersdale | June 1983 – 10 September 1986 | |
| Lords-in-Waiting | Michael Lucas, 2nd Baron Lucas of Chilworth | June 1983 – 9 September 1984 | |
| Lords-in-Waiting | Jean Barker, Baroness Trumpington | 11 June 1983 – 25 March 1985 | |
| Lords-in-Waiting | Malcolm Sinclair, 20th Earl of Caithness | 8 May 1984 – 2 September 1985 | |
| Lords-in-Waiting | Ivon Moore-Brabazon, 3rd Baron Brabazon of Tara | 19 September 1984 – 10 September 1986 | |
| Lords-in-Waiting | Caroline Cox, Baroness Cox | 3 April 1985 – 2 August 1985 | |
| Lords-in-Waiting | Andrew Davidson, 2nd Viscount Davidson | 17 September 1985 – 10 September 1986 | |
| Lords-in-Waiting | Gloria Hooper, Baroness Hooper | 17 September 1985 – 14 June 1987 | |
| Lords-in-Waiting | Alexander Fermor-Hesketh, 3rd Baron Hesketh | 10 September 1986 – June 1987 | |
| Lords-in-Waiting | Maxwell Aitken, 3rd Baron Beaverbrook | 10 September 1986 – June 1987 | |
| Lords-in-Waiting | Alexander Scrymgeour, 12th Earl of Dundee | 3 October 1986 – June 1987 | |

== Notes ==
| Preceded by First Thatcher ministry | Government of the United Kingdom; 1983–1987 | Succeeded by Third Thatcher ministry |
