= 1984 United Kingdom budget =

- Presented: 13 March 1984
- Parliament: 49th
- Party: Conservative Party
- Chancellor: Nigel Lawson

The 1984 United Kingdom budget was delivered by Nigel Lawson, the Chancellor of the Exchequer, to the House of Commons on 13 March 1984. It was the first budget to be presented by Lawson, who had been appointed as chancellor after the 1983 general election, and saw him embark on "a radical programme of tax reform". These included a reduction in Corporation Tax and a cut in the higher rate of Transfer Tax and raised the Stamp Duty threshold.

== Background ==
Nigel Lawson was promoted to the role of Chancellor from the Department of Energy after the Conservatives won the 1983 general election. In that year's Autumn Statement he hinted at a giveaway worth around £1.5bn (Note: about £5bn at 2021 prices) in the next budget, although when the statement was delivered in March 1984 the actual amount turned out to be closer to £750m. (Note: about £2565m at 2021 prices)

== Overview ==
In his first budget, Lawson told the House that he was embarking on "a radical programme of tax reform". These reforms included reducing Corporation Tax from 52% to 50% and abolishing the 1% National Insurance surcharge for employers. The investment income surcharge was also abolished, while the top rate of Transfer Tax was cut. The chancellor lifted the threshold for Stamp Duty, and increased income tax personal allowances, but did not make any changes to income tax rates themselves. VAT was extended to cover hot takeaway food and drink, and building operations, while excise duty was increased on alcohol and cigarettes, with 2p on a pint of beer, 10p on a bottle of spirits, and 10p on a packet of 20 cigarettes. However, duty on wine was cut by 18p a bottle in line with a European court order. Life assurance premium tax relief was also abolished.

== Reaction ==
In his budget response, Neil Kinnock, the newly-elected leader of the Labour Party, and leader of the Opposition, said the budget "does more for the City of London than it does for the country".

The budget was well received by Conservative Party MPs, who viewed Lawson as a hero. Their only concern was over the abolition of life assurance premium tax relief.

== Legacy ==
Future budgets would go on to further reduce Corporation Tax, with it falling to 45% in 1985, 40% in 1986 and 35% in 1987.
