= 1986 United Kingdom budget =

- Presented: 18 March 1986
- Country: United Kingdom
- Parliament: 49th
- Party: Conservative Party
- Chancellor: Nigel Lawson

The 1986 United Kingdom budget was delivered by Nigel Lawson, the Chancellor of the Exchequer, to the House of Commons on 18 March 1986. It was the third budget to be presented by Lawson, and saw the start of a programme of tax cuts initiated under the leadership of Conservative Prime Minister Margaret Thatcher. Lawson set the theme of his budget as "popular capitalism" and stated his wish to turn a nation of homeowners into a nation of shareholders. As well as a cut in the basic rate of income tax from 30% to 29%, there were other changes to taxation. 1986 was also the year the chancellor announced the launch of the Personal equity plan (PEP), a tax-exempt plan that would allow ordinary members of the public to invest up to £2,400 a year in equities. Labour leader Neil Kinnock, the leader of the Opposition, dismissed the budget as a "bits and pieces budget" that promised "jam tomorrow".

== Overview ==
Lawson's idea with "popular capitalism" was to create a society "in which more and more men and women have a direct personal stake in British business and industry", building on the already growing trend of employee share schemes, as well as the government's programme of privatisation.

To this end, he began a programme of tax cuts and investment reforms designed to allow people to keep more of what they were earning, and encourage them to invest their money. He announced the creation of the personal equity plan (PEP) which would allow members of the public to "shelter" from tax of up to £2,400 per year in stocks. The basic rate of income tax was reduced from 30% to 29%, the first cut in income tax since 1979, while other tax changes were also announced. Capital Transfer Tax was renamed Inheritance Tax, and the tax levied on gifts given during a deceased person's lifetime was abolished (unless the gift was given in their final year of life). Tax relief for charity donations made by companies or individuals, described as "Give as you Earn", was announced. Duty on a packet of 20 cigarettes was increased by 11p, while duty on petrol was raised by 7.5p per gallon.

In his speech Lawson said that social security changes being brought in that year, principally the replacement of Family Income Supplement by Family Credit, world save £120 million in the 1987–88 financial year.

== Reaction ==
In his response to the budget, Opposition Labour Party leader Neil Kinnock described it as a "bits and pieces budget" that promised "jam tomorrow".

The 1986 budget saw the first reduction in income tax since 1979. Lawson would further reduce the basic rate of income tax in his subsequent budgets of 1987 and 1988 cutting it to 25% by 1988.

== See also ==
- Lawson Boom
- Monetarism
