= Big Bang (financial markets) =

1986 reform of the London Stock Exchange

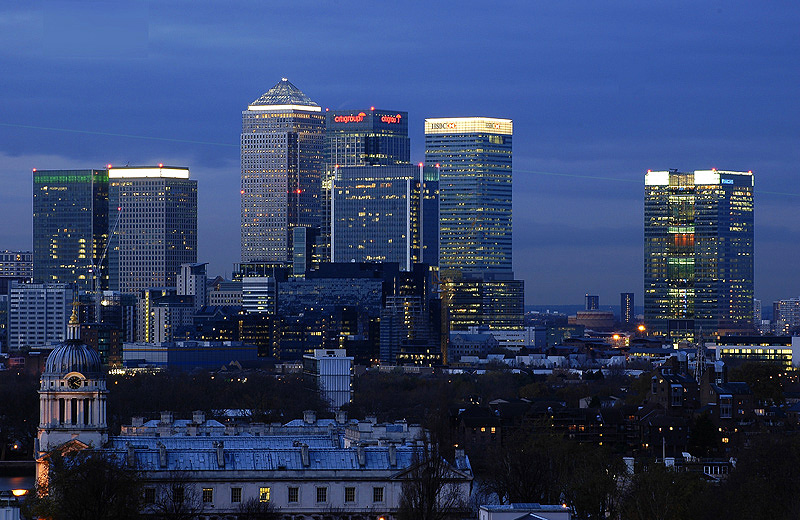
Canary Wharf in London

The phrase Big Bang, used in reference to the sudden deregulation of financial markets, was coined to describe measures, including abolition of fixed commission charges and of the distinction between stockjobbers and stockbrokers on the London Stock Exchange and change from open outcry to screen-based electronic trading, effected by UK Prime Minister Margaret Thatcher in 1986.

== History ==
The Big Bang was the result of an agreement in 1983 by the Thatcher government and the London Stock Exchange to settle a wide-ranging antitrust case that had been initiated during the previous government by the Office of Fair Trading against the London Stock Exchange under the Restrictive Trade Practices Act 1956. These restrictive practices included the London Stock Exchange's rules establishing fixed minimum commissions, the "single capacity" rule (which enforced a separation between brokers acting as agents for their clients on commission and jobbers who made the markets and theoretically provided liquidity by holding lines of stocks and shares on their books), the requirement that both brokers and jobbers should be independent and not part of any wider financial group, and the stock exchange's exclusion of all foreigners from stock exchange membership.

The day the London Stock Exchange's rules changed on 27 October 1986 was dubbed "Big Bang" because of the increase in market activity expected from an aggregation of measures designed to alter the structure of the financial market.

The effect of Big Bang led to significant changes to the structure of the financial markets in London. The changes saw many of the old firms being taken over by large banks both foreign and domestic and would lead in the following years to further changes to the regulatory environment that would eventually lead to the creation of the Financial Services Authority.

== Consequences ==
The effects of Big Bang were dramatic, with London's place as a financial capital decisively strengthened, to the point where in 2006 it was arguably the world's most important financial centre. The boom resulted in the relocation of institutions into new developments in the nearby Isle of Dogs area, particularly that of Canary Wharf.

Although the "Big Bang" eased stock market transactions, there is a debate in the UK about how far it affected the 2008 financial crisis.

In 2010, Nigel Lawson, Margaret Thatcher's Chancellor of the Exchequer at the time of Big Bang, appeared on the BBC Radio Four programme Analysis to discuss the banking reform. During the programme, Lawson is reported as having "converted to the Glass-Steagall cause" of separating retail banking from investment banking, due to concerns that it was a moral hazard ("[banks] are not going to be as careful and as cautious and as prudent as they should be") and that banks which were "too big to fail" would do so at taxpayers' expense, as seen during the 2008 financial crisis.

During the programme, the presenter, Edward Stourton, said, "Lord Lawson isn't alone in his admission that [through the 'Big Bang'] we walked into the new banking world without really understanding the risks involved" in ending the separation of high street banks and merchant banks. Lawson mused, "I didn't give it a great deal of thought at that time. I'd taken for granted that separation, as by custom and practice we'd had that all those years (we'd always had it), but it was a completely unforeseen consequence of the stock exchange reforms".

John Reed, a former Citigroup banker, says that “we were simply ignorant of the risks that we were getting into” from the repeal of Glass-Steagall in 1999. He attributes its repeal in the United States to his customers (“big international institutions”) wanting to issue commercial paper, instead of borrowing directly from banks, as well as to the Big Bang, after which “globalised markets” and “inter-connected capital markets” made it difficult to sustain one regime in London and a different one in New York.

In 2011 former British Prime Minister Gordon Brown expressed regret at not implementing tougher regulations during his tenure as chancellor between 1997 and 2007, responding to "relentless pressure" from the City not to over-regulate.

We know in retrospect what we missed. We set up the Financial Services Authority (FSA) believing that the problem would come from the failure of an individual institution, so we created a monitoring system which was looking at individual institutions. That was the big mistake.

We didn't understand how risk was spread across the system, we didn't understand the entanglements of different institutions with the other and we didn't understand even though we talked about it just how global things were, including a shadow banking system as well as a banking system.

That was our mistake, but I'm afraid it was a mistake made by just about everybody who was in the regulatory business.

— Gordon Brown

== Similar events ==
=== United States ===
On 1 May 1975, the United States Securities and Exchange Commission (SEC) eliminated fixed rate brokerage commissions on stock trades. This deregulation got rid of the fixed commission schedule set by the New York Stock Exchange (NYSE), which all member firms were required to follow. Before deregulation, firms charged the same minimum fee (1%–2% of the trade's value) depending on the size of the trade, ever since the 1792 Buttonwood Agreement. Because of this, the typical fee incurred on U.S. stock trades is currently ~0.25%, with some platforms taking no commission on online trades.

=== Japan ===
On 1 October 1994, Japan's Ministry of Finance implemented the first phase of securities commission deregulation. This reform was part of a broader financial liberation agenda known as the "Japanese Big Bang." The overall goal was to modernize Japan's financial system and increase global competitiveness. For decades prior, firms in Japan operated under a uniform commission structure that was enforced by the Japanese Securities Dealers Association (JSDA), which set minimum fees for both institutional and retail trades on the Tokyo Stock Exchange (TSE). The fixed rate system in Japan had long been criticized for inflating transaction costs and protecting brokers from competition. The deregulation was completed in April 1999 and successfully increased competition between brokers, and lowered trading fees across the board.

== See also ==
- Wimbledon Effect
