= Family Income Supplement =

Historical welfare benefit in the UK

Family Income Supplement was a means-tested benefit for working people with children introduced in Britain in 1970 by the Conservative government of Edward Heath, effective from August 1971. It was not intended to be a permanent feature of the social security system and was abolished by the Social Security Act 1986 (c. 50), which replaced it with Family Credit.

Half of the amount by which the claimant's income fell below £15/week was paid, plus £2 for each additional child, to a maximum of £3/week (revised to £4/week). In addition, those in receipt were given entitlement to free school meals and passported to the NHS Low Income Scheme. Claimants were required to provide payslips to prove that they were in remunerative full-time work for a minimum of 30 hours per week, or 24 hours for single parents. In 1985, differential rates for children under 11, from 11 to 15 and over 16 were introduced. There was a maximum payment to prevent abuse from claimants or employers deliberately reducing or understating earnings.

Once entitlement was established, it continued for 52 weeks regardless of changes in circumstances.

Entitlement was calculated with respect to gross income, which exacerbated the poverty trap. Each extra £1 a week in gross earnings would reduce weekly Family Income Supplement by 50p, on top of which most claimants would be subject to income tax and National Insurance Contributions of at least 30p, which produced a very high marginal withdrawal rate. Additionally, the loss of entitlement took with it entitlement to health and education benefits.

The take-up of the benefit was initially poor, with less than half of those eligible claiming.

== See also ==
- Child benefits in the United Kingdom
- Working Tax Credit
- Welfare
- Welfare in the United Kingdom
- Workfare
- Workfare in the United Kingdom
