= Family Credit =

Social security benefit in Great Britain

Family Credit (FC) was a social security benefit introduced by the Social Security Act 1986 (c. 50) for low-paid workers with children in Great Britain that replaced Family Income Supplement.

The benefit was designed for families with children if at least one person is working more than 24 hours a week on average. That represented an exclusion with entitlement to Income Support. The work was to be intended to last at least five weeks.

It was succeeded by Working Families' Tax Credit (WFTC) in 1999, which was later replaced by Working Tax Credit in 2003.

Researchers - describing the successor WFTC as more generous - suggest WFTC led to stronger wage growth and employment over FC.

== Calculation ==
These figures used the rates currently in 1997. There was a maximum credit for each family. One adult credit, regardless of whether there were one or two adults, was £47.65, plus an amount for each child that varied by age: £12.05 under 11, £19.95 from 11 to 15, £24.80 from 16 to 17 and £34.70 at 18.

A family whose net income, not including Child Benefit, Maternity Allowance, or One-Parent Benefit, was £77.15 or less got the maximum. Income was calculated using the same principles as for Housing Benefits but without disregarding earnings. Up to £60 was deductible for the cost of childcare if neither claimant nor partner could care for the children while working. If the income was higher, 70% of the difference was deducted from the maximum for the purpose of entitlement. An extra £10.55 was added if the claimant worked 30 or more hours a week.

The benefit was paid by an order book, which lasted for six months, regardless of a change in circumstances change, unless someone else claimed benefit for one of the children. One could choose to have the money paid directly into a bank account.

A claimant with capital of more than £8000 could not get Family Credit. The capital between £3000 and £8000 reduced the benefit. If a child had capital of more than £3000, it was excluded from the calculation but did not otherwise affect the benefit.

In two-parent families, the woman was expected to claim. The claimant had to be actually working during the claim. Five weekly, two monthly pay slips or a statement from the employer were required. The self-employed had to provide accounts or estimates of earnings.

Claimants were required to be present and "ordinarily resident" in Great Britain when they claimed, and all remunerative work had to be in Great Britain.

== Government cost savings ==
Chancellor of the Exchequer Nigel Lawson said in his 1986 budget speech that social security changes brought in that year would save £120 million in the 1987–88 financial year.

== Effect on other benefits ==
The amount paid through Family Credit was taken into account in full for calculating Income Support, Council Tax Rebate and Housing Benefit. Those who got Family Credit were also passported to the NHS Low Income Scheme, cheap dried milk for babies, travel to hospital for treatment and possible Social Fund grants for babies or funerals.

The poverty trap was that someone who got Family Credit and also paid income tax would see no more than 19p a week for each £1 a week pay increase. A worker receiving Housing Benefit as well could have been on a marginal tax rate of 96p.

== See also ==
- Child benefits in the United Kingdom
- Working Tax Credit
- Universal Credit
- Welfare
- Welfare in the United Kingdom
- Workfare
- Workfare in the United Kingdom
