= Personal Equity Plan =

A Personal Equity Plan (PEP) was a form of tax-privileged investment account in the United Kingdom, available between 1986 and 1999.

== History ==
The plans were introduced by Nigel Lawson in the 1986 budget to encourage equity ownership among the wider population. PEPs were allowed to contain collective investments such as unit trusts. The single company PEP, which was allowed to contain shares of a single company, was introduced in 1992. PEPs were superseded by Individual Savings Accounts [ISAs] in 1999, and remaining accounts were converted to ISAs in 2008.

== Types and privileges ==
Growth in a PEP was free from capital gains tax within the fund and on encashment. Income was free from income tax. When introduced in 1986, the fund was limited to an annual allowance of £2,400, but later increased to two types of PEP: the "general PEP" with an annual allowance of £6,000 and the "single company PEP" with an annual allowance of £3,000.

Investments in a general PEP were limited to qualifying collective investments. Qualifying investments had at least half of their assets invested in the UK, later extended to the European Union. The qualification rule for existing PEPs was removed in 2001.

Single company PEPs could be invested in one company only. One way they could be used was to hold windfall shares received by members from mutual bodies when they became listed companies.

== Evolution ==
Beginning 6 April 1999, the Advanced Corporation Tax relief on share dividends received on a PEP was halved, partially ending their tax-exempt status. From 6 April 2004 all relief on dividends was removed, although no additional tax at the higher rate was due where otherwise it might have been. Gains on capital, and all other forms of income such as cash interest and bond income, remained tax-free. Significant cash holdings for any length of time were discouraged by HM Revenue and Customs; the holdings in a PEP were supposed to be shares or corporate bonds.

== Replacement ==
Following the introduction of Individual Savings Accounts on 6 April 1999, no new contributions could be made into PEPs. Existing funds retained their tax privileges and could be transferred to alternative managers. The distinction between general and single company PEPs was removed. On 6 April 2008, PEP accounts automatically became stocks and shares ISAs.
