= Tax credit overpayment =

In the tax law of the United Kingdom, tax credit overpayment occurs when a claimant (person filing taxes) has received more Working Tax Credit (WTC) or Child Tax Credit (CTC) than HMRC’s final end of year calculations awards them. This can be caused by official or claimant error or neglect, or simply because the provisional payments were based on out of date information. This article is solely about overpayment, not about details of the tax system as a whole.

Since the implementation of the Tax Credit Act 2002 (TCA 2002) HMRC consider overpaid tax credit in the same light as unpaid income tax, and can use the full extent of their powers to pursue recovery (aka repayment)

Records for each completed year (all awards up to date and closed) show that one third of all tax credit claims have been overpaid. In fact 1/3 are also underpaid, and only 1/3 paid correctly on average.

Finalised Tax Credit Awards 2003-2004	Finalised Tax Credit Awards 2004-2005	Finalised Tax Credit Awards 2005-2006
5,670,000 claims for Tax Credits.	6,458,000 claims for Tax Credits.	6,480,000 claims for Tax Credits.
1,879,000 claims were overpaid by a total of £1,931,000,000. 33.14% of claims OVERPAID.	1,958,000 claims were overpaid by a total of £1,695,000,000. 30.32% of claims OVERPAID.	1,902,000 claims were overpaid by a total of £1,573,000,000. 29.32% of claims OVERPAID

== Causes of overpayment ==
A combination of several of the following may be responsible for any overpayment bill.

Customer Error Applicants delaying informing HMRC of changes of circumstances (CoC's) such as children leaving a household, ending employment, or splitting from a partner. This also includes applicants giving incorrect information on making/updating claims, or failing to respond in a timely manner to deadlines in the Tax Credit process.

Annualised taxation calculations Because entitlement to tax credits depends on the level of income received for the tax year it is being paid, the true award cannot be finalised until the end of that year, as such all payments are ‘provisional’ until an end of year calculation. The result is that an overpayment can be discovered at the end (or even during) an award.

Inflexibility of the system HMRC did not anticipate claimants' incomes and circumstances would vary so much ‘in year’. The system operates retroactively, so delays allowing for changes to process mean overpayment can occur even if changes are reported timely. The resulting numerous and confusing paperwork amendments to claims caused additional problems.

The Tax Credit Office initially took the decision not to require or act on notifications of circumstance changes ‘in year’ anyway, and instead save this information until the end of the year to factor into a single entitlement recalculation. This meant overpayments built up even where claimants notified HMRC of all changes of circumstance (CoC's)

Provisional payments made between the end of one claim and the processing of another assumed income was predictable and stable. In practice, income details used could be two years out of date and were not even being supplied by the claimant on which to base any current payments. The result was awards were not even properly started for that year and may already have been overpaid.

Calculations and deductions HMRC told claimants to apply deductions before declaring their income if they had had a child in the previous year, reducing the gross figure of the claimant's income and therefore increased their entitlement to a higher level of award. In reality, this actually caused an overpayment because it transpired that this calculation only worked when it was assumed that the claimant would not be going back to work in the following year.

HMRC's lack of experience with the TC client base Because HMRC as a whole, and the staff in general, were used to dealing with higher income earners, they had no understanding of the importance of reliable and secure awards, nor the empathy or experience to deal reasonably with frustrated, confused claimants who had variable circumstances and little previous experience of taxation.

Take up of Tax Credit was far higher than expected and staff were working under pressure with fixed deadlines, little training, backlogs, confused claimants and inadequate facilities. Untrained and private sector staff were answering claimant's calls, and callers were not advised of this.

Annulled awards These types of overpayment bills are called 'annulled awards' because the Tax Credit Office have said the claimant didn't return the end of year declaration within the time limit. This automatically 'wipes out' their entitlement to all the payments they already received for that tax year.

Wrong Capacity this is when a claim is terminated because HMRC believe the couple / single status of the adults on the award was wrong. Rather than the status being changed, the claim is automatically cancelled and all payments already made are ruled as overpaid. No replacement claim is calculated in the ‘right’ capacity unless the claimant invokes the dispute process and is able to successful argue for a Notional Entitlement assessment.

The I.T infrastructure The computerised system on which processing, recording and calculating claimants awards was based was flawed. ‘Glitches’ in the systems mean records are lost or not logged, records were not kept of all communications to the Tax Credit Office, award notices that claimants are supposed to check are not posted or received, and the dual level system means that call operative give out the wrong information regarding claims because they cannot see all case information. The company responsible EDS were later sued by HMRC

== Fraud and error ==
To be overpaid is not an accusation or suspicion of fraud or neglect, and there doesn't have to have been an error for an overpayment to have occurred.

"An element of overpayment to claimants was an inherent part of the design of the tax credits system"

         Quote from the Public Accounts Committee's chairman Edward Leigh [6]

Unhelpfully HMRC combine the figures for fraud and error when publicly releasing the information and do not separate out which is claimant error and which is official error.

== Dispute process ==
Some claimants are initially confused when informed of an overpayment, and believe that HMRC are trying to reclaim money the claimant didn't receive. This is because during the course of an award claimants are sent award notices stating the current rate of payments, so when an overpayment is declared claimants don't understand that those award notices are now ‘wrong’. If the circumstances used to calculate an overpayment are correct, then there is no denying the amount paid was wrong, but responsibility, and therefore who should have to foot the bill, can be contested.

Terminology causes confusion here as accepted language would be to Appeal, but because Tax Credits is enshrined in tax law, and in that Appeal has a specific meaning, it is not possible to Appeal against the recovery of an overpayment. (As that would be to insist the circumstances used for the final calculation were wrong) instead, in cases where responsibility for the cause of the overpayment is contested, the correct terminology is to dispute recovery of the overpayment.

It is possible to dispute informally, but there is a set structure and route through the process. HMRC's Code of Practice 26 (COP 26) sets out the basics of why and how claimants can dispute recovery of an overpayment but does not go into detail. Several agencies offer support and guidance in disputing including the Citizens Advice Bureau (CAB) and the Tax Credit Casualties

== Contentious issues ==
There have been many criticisms of the delivery of tax credits and the handling of overpayment disputes

Criticisms have centred on:

• That the dispute process is not independently adjudicated.

• The number of HMRC errors claimants are expected to spot.

• The level of understanding of tax law HMRC assumed claimants would have.

• HMRC's lack of clear information regarding how to dispute.

• The poor administration and training of staff.

• The automatic renewal process that automatically starts a new claim when a claimant provides closing details for the previous year's claim, whether they want a new claim or not.

• That there is no opt out of the system, if a claimant still qualifies but doesn't want to claim HMRC have to list ‘household break up’ on the claim to invalidate it.

• That the computer system was rolled out with so many flaws in it.

• That the increase income disregard from £2,500 to £25,000 was not retroactively backdated and is not the safety net it was supposed to be

• HMRC adjusting awards after finalisation, often going back several years, which instantly ‘creates’ overpayments.

• The flawed assumptions about how claimants lived that left the system inflexible and unrealistic.

• The low rate of successful disputes.

• Implementation of the Civil Partnerships bill and decisions regarding claimants deemed to be Living Together As Husband And Wife (LTAHAW) have seen them get criticised for dictating lifestyle politics

• The annualised calculation system - HMRC traditionally are used to dealing with high income earners and corporations who ‘balance’ their tax accounts on a yearly basis and have the savings and income to be able to do this.
