= Child benefits in the United Kingdom =

UK welfare benefits for parents

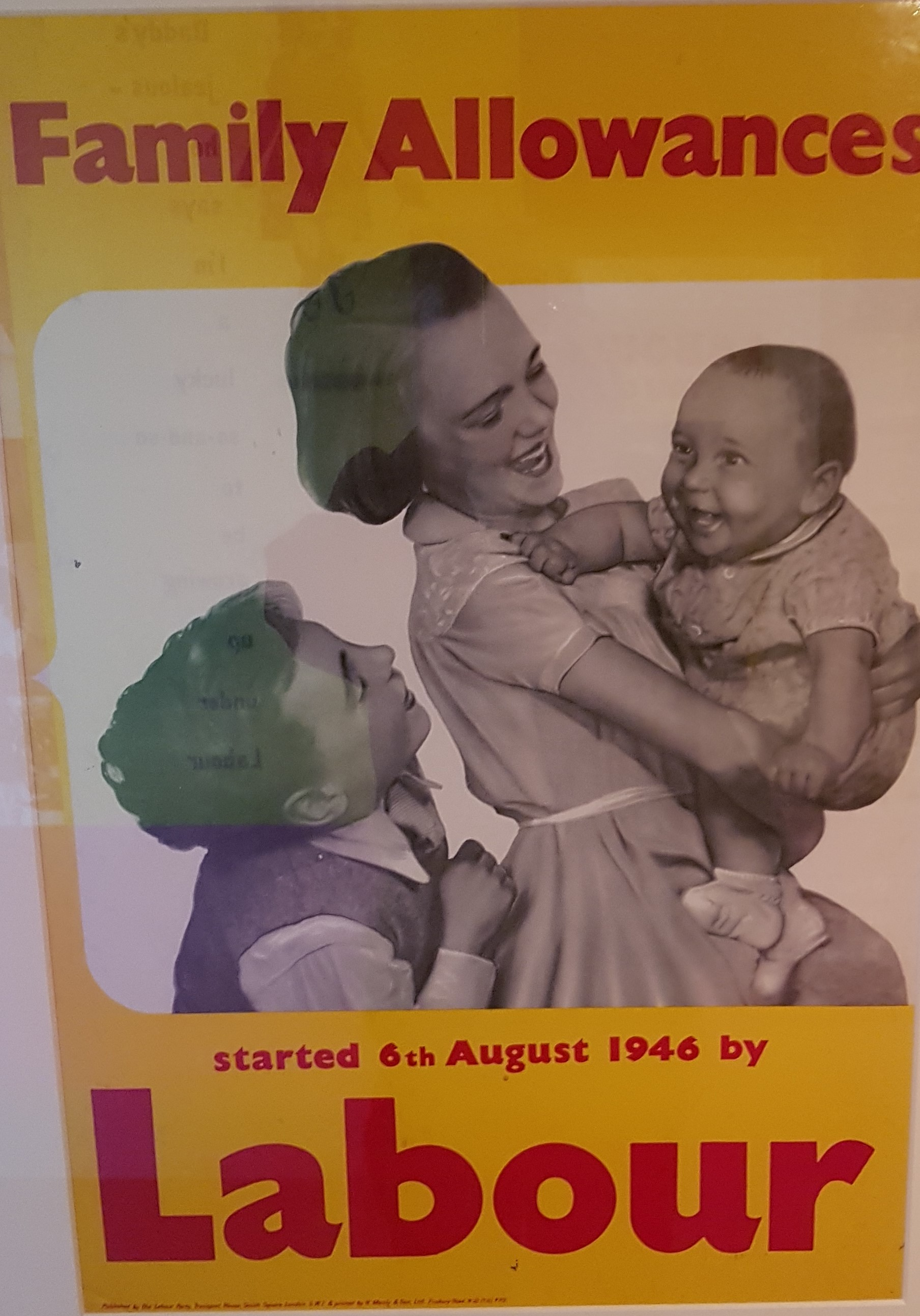
Family Allowances Labour Party poster

Child benefits in the United Kingdom are a series of welfare payments and tax credits made to parents with children in the UK, a major part of the welfare state.

== The child tax allowance ==
The first modern child tax credit was introduced in David Lloyd George's 1909 'People's Budget'. This introduced a £10 income tax allowance per child, for tax payers earning under £500 per annum. Following extensive Parliamentary debate, the Budget became law as the Finance Act (1909–1910) 1910 on 29 April 1910. Since the income tax rate was then 1 shilling and tuppence in the pound (5.83%), the value of the tax credit was therefore 11 shillings and eight pence per child. Since most people did not earn enough to pay tax, this was a subsidy for middle-class parents. The nominal value of these tax credits were generally, though not always, increased in line with income tax rates. For instance, by 1916, income tax had increased to five shillings in the pound (25%), and the tax credit to £25, giving a value of the tax credit of £6 5 shillings.

Child Tax Allowance was removed in 1979, when the value of the allowance was transferred into a higher child benefit payment.

== Family Allowance ==
Calls began for a specific family payment in the early part of the twentieth century. These were successfully opposed by those who saw men, earning higher wages than women, as bread-winners, supporting the family through their wages – family allowance payments were seen as socialist and/or feminist in nature.

Over the 1930s, growing evidence showed that large numbers of children were born into poverty, with 47% suffering five years or more of malnutrition. Higher wages would not effectively target these children, as the majority of male workers had no dependent children. A White Paper on Family Allowances was published in May 1942, giving costings for various levels of family allowance. These were not immediately adopted, and following the publication of the Beveridge Report, which called for subsistence levels of payments, uprated with the cost of living, the Family Allowances Act 1945 was passed. This provided for a five shilling per week payment for each child, after the first. This was designed to support large families, and was set well below the nine shilling a week subsistence level (further devalued by inflation) recommended by Beveridge. In 1952 the rate was increased to eight shillings per week. In 1956 the rate for the third and subsequent children was increased to ten shillings per week, and the maximum age for payments for dependent children was increased from 15 to 18.

In 1968 the rates were increased from 8 to 15 and then 18 shillings and from 10 to 17 shillings and then £1 respectively, but this was paid for in part by a reduction in the value of child tax allowance, so that the poor would benefit, but the middle classes did not.

In 1975, the rate was increased to £1.50 (equivalent to 30 shillings) for each child after the first.

== Family Income Supplement ==
Family Income Supplement was introduced in 1970 by the new Conservative government of Edward Heath, following a child poverty campaign, effective from August 1971, and provided for a payment to families on low wages. Claimants were required to provide payslips, to prove they were in employment, for a minimum of 24 hours per week. Take-up of the benefit was initially poor, with less than half of those eligible claiming.

Rates were raised largely in line with inflation to 1979, but several above-inflation increases followed under the Conservative government of Margaret Thatcher. By November 1984, rates had risen to a maximum £23/week for one child, and an additional maximum of £2/week for each subsequent child, based on a maximum income threshold of £90/week, plus £10/week for each additional child. In addition, the numbers of families in receipt of the benefit, which showed no increase in the number of recipients over the 1970s (in 1972, there were 89,000 in receipt, and in 1980, 88,000), increased sevenfold over the course of the 1979–1997 Conservative governments.

Year	Claimants	Annual growth rate
1972	89,000	N/A
1980	85,000	0%
1985	199,000	18.5%
1990	300,000	9.8%
1995	600,000	13.6%
1999	780,000	6.8%

The Social Security Act 1986 provided for Family Income Supplement to be replaced with Family Credit, a similar scheme.

== Child Benefit ==
The Child Benefit Bill was introduced in 1975 by Barbara Castle, based on the child credit element of the rejected previous Heath government's Tax Credit proposal that would have replaced PAYE, integrating tax and benefits.

Child benefits introduced for the first time a universal payment, paid for each child, doubling the number of children within its scope. Like the family allowance, which it replaced, the new benefit was not means tested; an attempt by the Callaghan government to introduce this was thwarted in 1976 when cabinet papers were leaked to the Child Poverty Action Group.

The rate payable was £1/week for the first and £1.50 for each subsequent child. An addition 50p was payable to lone-parent families. Unlike the family allowance, provision was made for the rate to be uprated, at the Secretary of State's discretion, each year. By the end of 1978 the rate had been increased to £3/week for each child, with an additional £2/week payable to lone-parent families. When the Child Tax Allowance was removed in 1979, child benefit payments were increased to £4/week, plus £2.50/week extra for lone-parent families.

Child benefit rates were uprated roughly in line with inflation until 1988, but subsequently was frozen until 1990, in order to curb welfare spending. A new higher rate of child benefit, payable for the first child only, was introduced in 1991. This was £1 higher than the rate payable for subsequent children, which was again frozen, at £7.25/week. From 1991 Child Benefit increased in line with inflation, until 1998, when the new Labour government increased the first child rate by more than 20%, and abolished the Lone Parent rate.

New Labour oversaw the biggest increase in child benefit in UK history, with over 7.2 million mothers and 12.8 million children benefitting from a 25% rise above inflation. This rise in child benefit directly contributed to the lifting of over 1.8 million children out of poverty.

Rates increased again in line with inflation until 2010, since which time they have been frozen.

Effective from 7 January 2013, Child Benefit, a universal benefit since its introduction, became means tested – those earning more than £50,000 per year would have part of their benefit withdrawn, and if earning over £60,000, would receive nothing at all. This high income child benefit charge (HICBC) was based on individual, not household income, hence a household of two earners each earning £50,000 would receive full child benefit, while a single-earner household earning £60,000 would receive none. However, the reduction or elimination for higher-earners does not take the form of a reduced weekly child benefit amount but rather the state is reimbursed by the higher earner via a tax charged on the higher earner (or if in a couple where both parties earn over £50,000 then the person earning the higher amount) in the amount that they were overpaid over the course of the previous year. Couples can choose to "opt out" of child benefit if they estimate that this would be easier than paying back the overpaid amount each year. Vitally, at this time the optional registration for child benefit is linked to the government's contribution of National Insurance credits towards the pension of the parent who is the child's primary carer. If not registered for child benefit, National Insurance contributions would not be made. This information was not on the gov.uk website at the time of these changes and was added at a later date.

In the summer of 2023 it was announced that a new way of paying the charge would be available via a person's PAYE tax code. This process will be in place from summer 2025.

== Current rates ==
The following are the rates that apply as of June 2025:

Who the allowance is for	Weekly rate
Eldest or only child	£26.05
Additional children	£17.25 per child

== See also ==
- Speenhamland system
- Family Credit
- Working Families Tax Credit
- Child Tax Credit
- Universal Credit
