= Wimbledon Effect =

Analogy for the success of foreign financial firms in London

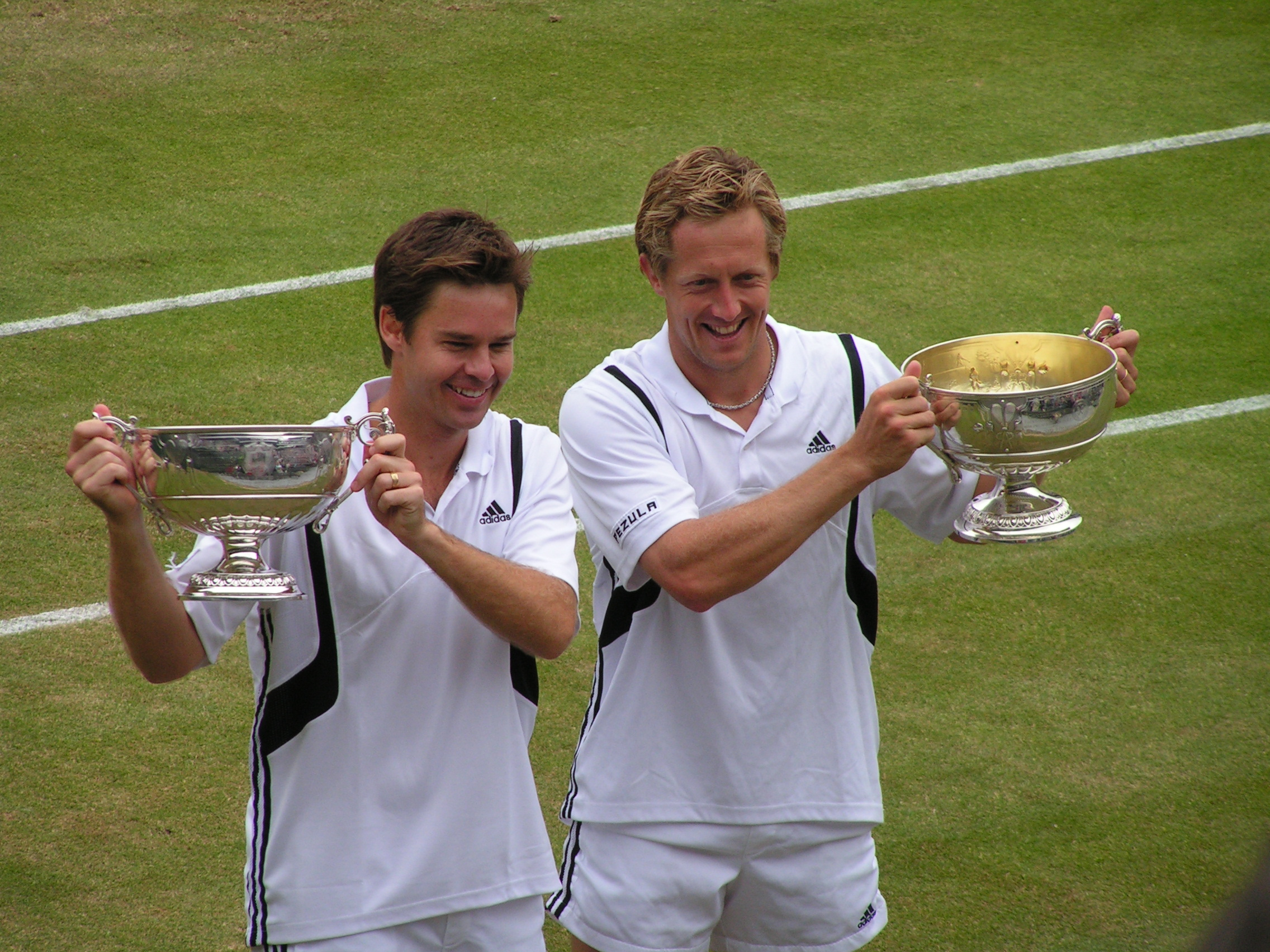
2002–2004 Wimbledon doubles champion, Todd Woodbridge from Australia and Jonas Björkman from Sweden

The Wimbledon Effect (Japanese: ウィンブルドン現象, rōmaji: Uinburudon Genshō, literally "Wimbledon Phenomenon") is a chiefly British and Japanese analogy, which possibly originated in Japan, that compares the tennis fame of the Wimbledon Championships with the economic success of the United Kingdom's financial services industries – especially those clustered in both the City of London and Canary Wharf.

The point of the analogy is that a national and international institution (the annual tennis tournament at Wimbledon) can be highly successful despite the lack of strong native competition, as in modern tennis Britain has produced very few Wimbledon singles champions, with only Anne Jones, Virginia Wade and Andy Murray winning the tournament in the Open Era.

== Financial context ==
London's financial industry has boomed since the deregulation of British financial markets (the "Big Bang") in 1986 under the Thatcher government – but has also become dominated by foreign companies, especially American investment banks, rather than British firms (a result opposite to the original intention of the reforms).

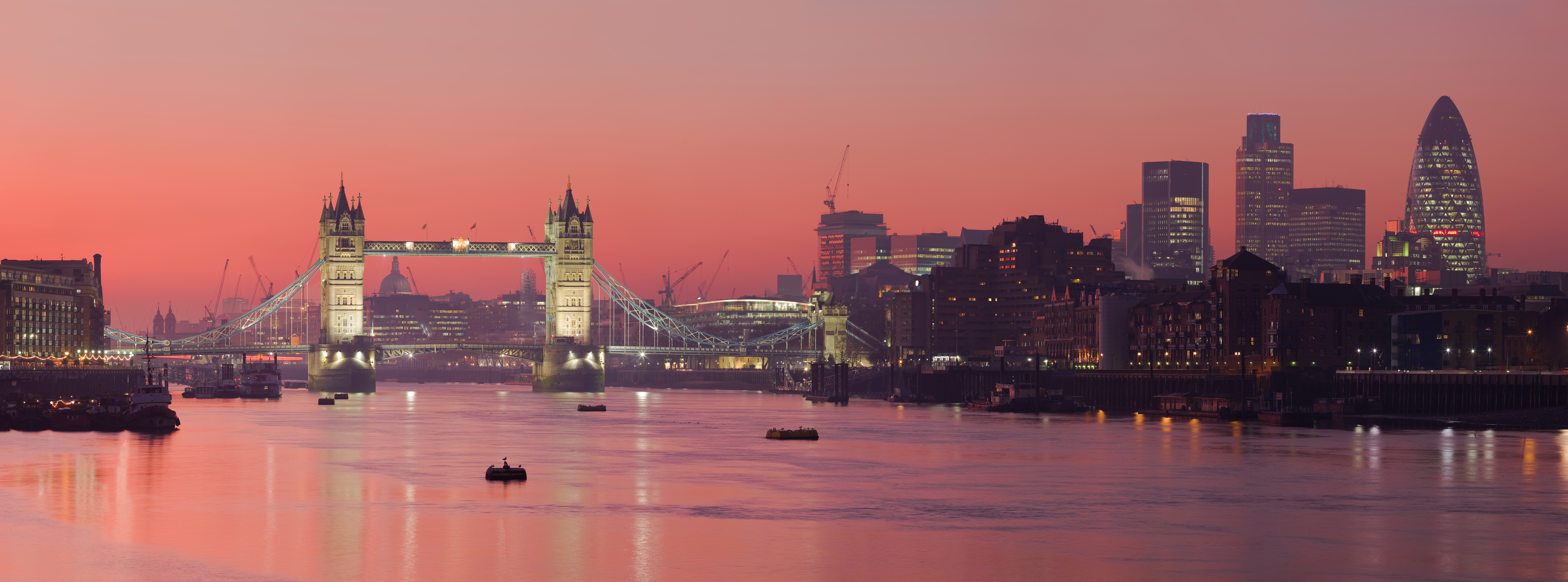
The City of London, pictured to the right, with Tower Bridge looming over the River Thames.

Thatcher's deregulation of London's markets is closely linked to neoliberalism, a widespread economic ideology prevalent in the latter half of the 20th and early 21st century across many western nations – including within the United States under the presidency of Ronald Reagan.

- Foreign takeovers and integration into the London market transformed London into a global hub of international finance.
- Neoliberal policy prioritized making London the most competitive global financial centre. The Thatcher government chose not to implement protectionist policies in the face of foreign competition.
- Although many of the financial institutions that solidify London's role in the global economy are headquartered abroad, the great sums of tax revenue from both corporation and income tax (from high-paying, service-orientated jobs) bolsters the United Kingdom's finances in an extremely beneficial manner. This is a key example of the Wimbledon effect in operation.

The analogy is typically used to mark a debate over whether it matters if an industry is primarily domestically owned if easing of foreign ownership restrictions allows the economy to benefit from foreign investment and increased global competition. The phrase can be used positively to assert the economic success of neoliberal attitudes towards foreign ownership (and sometimes to emphasize that such attitudes promote a level playing field for domestic and foreign interests alike); or it can be used negatively to emphasize how these policies have eroded a nation's ability to produce globally leading domestic companies. This opposing perspective is represented by economic patriotism and "national champion" policies. The analogy has also been used in policy discourses outside Britain – most notably in the business discourse of Japan, whose financial markets and other parts of the economy (as of 2006) had not yet been substantially opened up to foreign competition compared with its international peers. However, 20 years on and Japan has undergone sweeping overhauls to ease regulations on opening up to foreign competition. It has also, for instance, been used in banking reform debates in South Korea, as well as in discussing business process outsourcing in India.

== Sports in Japan ==
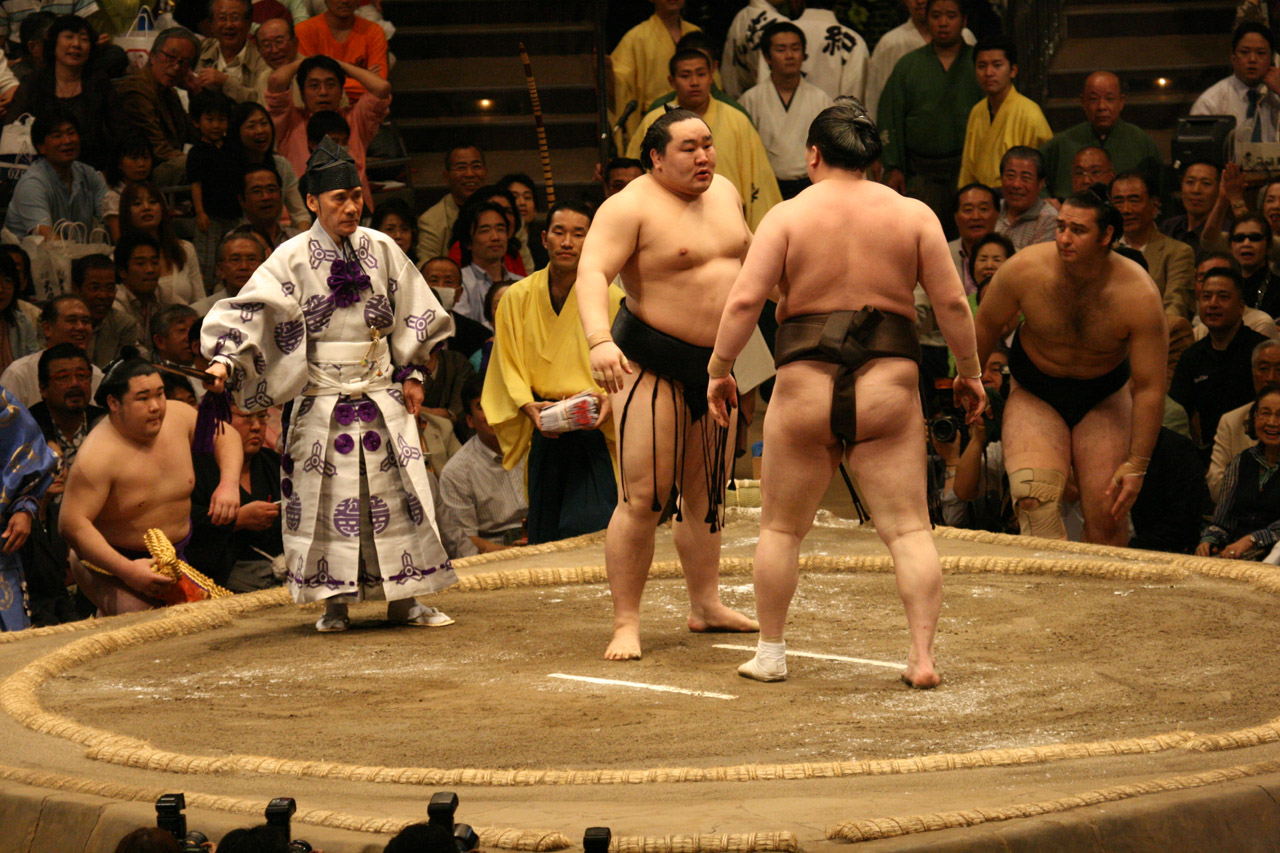
The 68th Asashōryū and the 69th yokozuna Hakuho, who are both from Mongolia.

The term has also frequently been appearing in sports in Japan since late 20th century, including sumo where there has been only two Japanese-born yokozuna since 1998 (Kisenosato and Onosato) as most of the top players have been from Mongolia or Polynesia. Similarly in combat sports (kakutougi), K-1 was the biggest kickboxing promotion of the world, whereas Pride Fighting Championships was the biggest mixed martial arts promotion of the world. Nevertheless, both K-1 and Pride had few Japanese-born popular players or champions. The vast majority of prominent competitors in K-1 came from the Netherlands or Thailand, while Pride's biggest names were from Brazil, United States, and Russia.

== See also ==
- Economic globalization
- Economy of the United Kingdom
- Economy of London
