= 1987 United Kingdom budget =

- Presented: 17 March 1987
- Parliament: 49th
- Party: Conservative Party
- Chancellor: Nigel Lawson

The 1987 United Kingdom budget was delivered by Nigel Lawson, the Chancellor of the Exchequer, to the House of Commons on 17 March 1987. It was the fourth budget to be presented by Lawson, and saw him announce tax cuts worth £2.6bn. He also forecast a £3bn reduction in government borrowing. Among his announcements were a reduction in the basic rate of income tax from 29% to 27%, and a reduction in Corporation Tax from 29% to 27%. The budget took place three months before the 1987 general election, which the Conservatives won. Neil Kinnock, leader of the Opposition Labour Party described it as a "bribes budget".

== Overview ==
At 59 minutes, Nigel Lawson's 1987 budget speech was the shortest to be delivered since Benjamin Disraeli's 45-minute speech of 1867, and was the first of the two budgets that can be considered as part of the Lawson Boom. The chancellor claimed that the government had cut taxes and borrowing, while raising public spending. The tax cuts amounted to a total of £2.6bn, (Note: about £8bn at 2021 prices) but the chancellor also forecast the public deficit could be reduced by £3bn. (Note: about £9bn at 2021 prices) Among the measures introduced in 1987 were a 2p reduction in the basic rate of income tax, which brought the lower rate down from 29% to 27%, as well as a 2% reduction in the level of Corporation Tax, which also cut it to 27%. Inheritance tax was also reduced. Changes were made to profit-related pay, meaning that half, instead of 25%, was now exempt from income tax up to either £3,000 or 20% of pay (whichever lower). Child benefit was frozen in real terms for the first time. It was announced that on-course betting duty for horse racing and greyhound racing would be scrapped from 29 March, but that duty on gambling machines would increase by 25% to compensate. Excise duty on unleaded petrol was reduced by 5p a gallon.

== Reaction ==
Labour Party leader Neil Kinnock, the leader of the Opposition, dismissed the budget as a "bribes budget", and argued "The government have chosen across-the-board cuts in taxation. The Opposition and the British people want across-the-board cuts in unemployment". But three months later the Conservatives were re-elected with a comfortable majority in the 1987 general election. Following their 1987 victory, Lawson followed up with further tax cuts in his 1988 budget, and was initially lauded for his good judgement. However, his tax cuts fuelled a housing boom which in turn led to a collapse in the housing market, and by the early 1990s the UK had entered a recession.

BBC News argues that the tax reductions and freeze in excise duties "made the later expansion of personal pension provision possible".
