= New Jobs tax credit =

The New Jobs tax credit was a tax credit policy created as part of the 1977 stimulus package enacted by the Carter administration and was in effect through 1978. The tax credit acted as a form of wage subsidy by granting employers a tax credit for making new hires. In 1979, the credit was not renewed and it was ultimately perceived as a failure due to poor execution and lack of exposure.

As written in the Tax Reduction and Simplification Act of 1977, the tax credit offered fifty percent of the first $4,200 in wages per employee for increases in employment of at least two percent over the previous year.

In early 2010, there was renewed interest in duplicating the original 1977 tax credit in legislation proposed by Barack Obama. The proposed tax credit was renamed and included in the Hiring Incentives to Restore Employment Act.
