= Working Tax Credit =

State benefit in the UK, introduced in April 2003

Working Tax Credit (WTC) was a state benefit in the United Kingdom made to people who worked and received a low income. It was introduced in April 2003 and was a means-tested benefit. Despite the name, the payment was not a tax credit linked to a person's tax bill, but a payment used to top-up low wages. The amount of WTC received could exceed the amount of tax paid. Unlike most other benefits, WTC was paid by HM Revenue and Customs (HMRC).

WTC could be claimed by working individuals, childless couples and working families with dependent children. In addition, some other people were also entitled to Child Tax Credit (CTC) if they were responsible for any children. WTC and CTC were assessed jointly and families remained eligible for CTC even if no adult was working or they had too much income to receive WTC.

In 2010, the coalition government announced that the Working Tax Credit would, by 2017, be integrated into and replaced by Universal Credit. However, implementation of this was repeatedly delayed. Since 2018, it has not been possible to make new claims for Working Tax Credit, and Universal Credit claims have to be made instead.

The payment of Working Tax Credit ended on 5 April 2025 and all remaining claimants had the option to apply for Universal Credit or, in some cases, Pension Credit. CTC also ended on the same date.

== History ==
The WTC replaced the Working Families Tax Credit (WFTC), which operated from April 1999 until March 2003. The WFTC was itself a transitional system from the earlier benefit for working families known as Family Credit (FC), which had been in operation since 1986.

The WFTC shared its assessment of means and period of renewal (6 months) with FC but moved towards a tax credit approach styled on schemes in other countries, which used an annual declaration of income to assess entitlement for a whole year. Tax credits also replaced the child elements in means tested benefits, the Children's Tax Credit in the tax system, and disabled persons tax credit.

In 2014 WTC and CTC combined distributed £30 billion per year.

== How it worked ==
The basic operation of the tax credit was broken down into the following steps:

1. An individual made an application for WTC to HM Revenue and Customs (HMRC).
2. HMRC calculated a provisional amount of tax credit to be awarded. It was based on the previous tax year's income and current circumstances. The tax credit was then paid in weekly or four weekly instalments to the claimant via a bank account until the end of the tax year, 5 April. It was possible to ask HMRC to base their calculations on the estimated current year's income, but this did carry some risks.
3. After the end of the tax year, HMRC sent claimants forms (TC603R and TC603D, commonly called renewal or declaration forms) asking them to confirm their actual income for the year just ended. For those who did not have actual income figures available, they had to provide an estimate to HMRC, usually by 31 July, and confirm this, usually by the following 31 January.
4. A final calculation of the WTC was made using the confirmed income. This final amount could be greater, equal to or lower than the provisional amount received the previous year.
5. If someone received more than the final WTC calculation, this was an over payment and had to be repaid to HMRC. Similarly, if someone received less than the final WTC calculation, this was an underpayment in which case HMRC would make a lump sum payment back to that person.

== Calculation of the annual award ==
The amount of the award was calculated from two separate amount as follows:

WTC award = Elements minus Withdrawal

The component called Elements was based on circumstances whilst the Withdrawal component was income based. The following sections describe how each component was arrived at.

=== Elements ===
The Working Tax Credit (WTC) and the Child Tax Credit (CTC) were made up of "elements" related to individual circumstances. Examples of elements for an entire year are:

- a basic element of £1,890 payable to everyone (in 2009/2010)
- a couple and lone parent element (£1,860)
- a 30 hour [working week] element (£775)
- a mildly or moderately disabled worker element (£2,530)
- a severely disabled worker element (£1,075)
- a 50+ return-to-work payment (discontinued after April 2012).

Each element that applied to a claimant's circumstances was added together to determine the maximum award of tax credit (before any withdrawal is considered). For example, a couple would have elements calculated as

Elements = £1,890 + £1,860 = £3,750

=== Withdrawal ===
The withdrawal rate is the amount that was deducted from the Elements described above. If the gross annual income exceeded a predetermined first threshold of £6,420 (in 2013/14) then the withdrawal rate was 41 per cent. This means that for every £1 earned above the threshold, 41p of the WTC entitlement was withdrawn.

As withdrawal of tax credits was based on 'gross' rather than 'net' income, however, the claimant was also subject to Class 1 NIC national insurance contributions at 12 per cent and UK income tax at 20 per cent—making an effective marginal tax rate of 73 per cent.

For example, if one person in a couple earned £10,000 pa, then the amount of withdrawal was

Withdrawal = 41% times (10,000 - 6,420) = £1,467.80

Under withdrawal, entitlement to WTC was gradually reduced first until 'exhausted' at an income level that can be calculated from the first threshold and the basic award. For a couple, for instance, this would be:

£6,420, plus (£1,920 + £1,970) divided by 41%. That is £15,908 in rounded figures.

=== Amount of WTC ===
In this example, the award is then calculated as follows:

WTC = Elements - Withdrawal = £3,750 - £1,396.20 = £2,353.80

== Interaction with Child Tax Credit ==
WTC and CTC were designed to be a seamless allowance that steadily reduced as family income rises.

If they were claimed together, both combined to form the basic award. This combined award was subject to withdrawal from the point at which WTC entitlement would have been zero (called the First threshold for those entitled to Child Tax Credit only). In 2009/10 this threshold was £16,040.

However, unlike WTC, CTC did not continue to reduce to zero. It reduced only until it reached the "basic family element" of £545pa. Thereafter it remained fixed until the household reached a second income threshold (£50,000 in 2009/10). After that it reduced again at a rate of £1 for every £15 of income.

Recipient households of combined WTC/CTC awards thus fell into three categories

- those on a 'main-rate' reduction of 70% (i.e. marginal tax + 39%) receiving > £545pa
- those on an income of up to £50,000 in receipt of the small flat rate family element (i.e. marginal tax only) receiving £545pa
- those with incomes between £50,000 and £58,170 (i.e. marginal tax + 6.67%) receiving £545pa

== Awards and disregards ==
WTC and CTC for the current tax year were considered to be an interim award because they were based on the previous tax year's gross household income. Final awards would need to be adjusted in subsequent years when the actual income was known.

Since large fluctuations from year to year would be undesirable, broad allowance was made for this by disregarding the first £2,500 of any increase in the final income from one year to the next. Only changes in excess of this income disregard were taken into account in establishing a final award. Overpayments were recovered by adjustment to the amount of the following years' interim award.

Tax credits did not prove to be nearly as robust or well administered as the initial design envisaged. Claimants did not always recognise the need to report any change of circumstances immediately. The time taken by the system of administration to then take these into account added to any overpayment generated and shortened the time available for their recovery. This led to significant levels of overpayments. In order to reduce the overpayment problem, the income disregard was raised tenfold from £2,500 to £25,000 with effect from 2006/07.

== Assessment of income ==
Income for tax credit purposes was in principle assessed similarly to UK income tax. Thus 'income' (c/f 'taxable income') consisted of what the individual received from gross earned and unearned sources—less allowances for 'expenditures' that would reduce that income. But, unlike income tax, tax credits measured income based on family 'household', rather than the individuals within. Also the effect of income disregard —to mask large annual increases in resources from reassessment— weakened comparisons with a true income tax still further.

By comparison with other means tested benefits, the income treatment of claimants of tax credits was especially generous; it permitted deduction of the full gross amount (rather than 50% net) of any individual pension contributions and any Gift aid payments. Since increases in income were subject to withdrawal at 39% (in the initial range), such reductions were effectively 'rebated' at the same rate through the tax credits received. Thus, while a pension (or Gift Aid) contribution of £100 would cost the employee £80 (after basic rate tax relief) directly from net pay, it attracted an additional £39 in tax credits; so the true cost was only £41.

Other concessions with regard to assessment of income (in contrast to means testing used elsewhere) included:

- disregarding the first £300 of 'other' gross income (rent, interest or dividends etc.).
- disregarding 'other' income derived from tax-free savings and investments
- having no explicit (ineligibility) limit for capital resources (as only actual income derived from capital is taken into account)

== Level of take-up ==
Around 7 million people in the UK were entitled to claim Working Tax Credit or the companion Child Tax Credit, although around 2 million people did not do so.

The levels of Tax Credit take-up in the UK had not risen by 2007, despite an increase of 100,000 children living in households classed as "below the poverty line" between 2004 and 2005.

== Implementation difficulties ==
The introduction of the Working Tax Credit scheme was marred by implementation issues and large-scale overpayments. The Office for National Statistics estimated that of the £13.5bn paid out in tax credits in 2004, £1.9bn consisted of overpayments. In addition, computer problems led to delays in many receiving payments, causing significant financial hardship for those on low incomes, and resulting in EDS losing its contract to provide the Inland Revenue with computer services.

These problems led to considerable political fallout. Dawn Primarolo, who as Paymaster General was the minister responsible for the implementation of tax credits, had to apologise to parliament and was asked whether she had "lost control" of her department. Prime Minister Tony Blair also apologised to Parliament over the incident.

== Criticism ==
The Working Tax Credit scheme was subject to much criticism, particularly in the wake of the difficulties surrounding its implementation. Criticism focused on the way that credits were calculated on an annual basis, leading to overpayment, followed by large demands for repayment, which those on low income could find difficult to meet. David Harker, chief executive of Citizens Advice, commented "This is an untenable system. An annualised system doesn't provide the stability of income required by low income families." In addition, the scheme was accused of being over-complicated and difficult for claimants to understand, and of underestimating the extent to which the incomes of low earners can fluctuate over a year, especially a problem for self-employed people whose income could fall below the minimum wage (at which point Working Tax Credit was disallowed).

The Labour Party said that the tax credit system was effective in tackling child poverty, with, by their government's definitions, 2 million children lifted out of absolute poverty and almost 1 million out of relative poverty by 2007. However, the subsequent Coalition government sought to redefine poverty so as to highlight "children living in workless households or those with drug-dependent parents", despite their tax credit incomes, remaining in poverty. Even with the previous definition, this government claimed that the existing tax credits system failed to "meet its statutory target to halve the problem by 2010 – despite the huge amount of taxpayers’ money spent on tackling it."

Any supplement to low wages acts as a perverse incentive for employers to keep wages low.

== See also ==
- Taxation in the United Kingdom
- UK labour law
- Earned income tax credit (1975) and New Jobs tax credit (1977) in the US
- Family Credit
- Welfare
- Welfare in the United Kingdom
- Workfare
- Workfare in the United Kingdom
