= 1985 United Kingdom budget =

- Presented: 19 March 1985
- Parliament: 49th
- Party: Conservative Party
- Chancellor: Nigel Lawson

The 1985 United Kingdom budget was delivered by Nigel Lawson, the Chancellor of the Exchequer, to the House of Commons on 19 March 1985. The second budget to be presented by Lawson, it was held shortly after the end of the year-long 1984–85 miners' strike. The chancellor said the cost of the strike on public borrowing had impacted on his plans for tax reductions, although he did make some changes to income tax personal allowances and stamp duty. Changes to National Insurance were also announced, but threatened to place extra costs on employers.

== Overview ==
In his statement, the chancellor told the House that the miners' strike had cost the government an extra £2.75bn (Note: about £9bn at 2021 prices) in public borrowing, while national output had been reduced by 1% during 1984. He wanted to use the budget to cut taxes, but his programme was far less reaching than he had hoped. He would later claim to have been "boxed in" by the strike, as well as high inflation and high unemployment. Measures announced in the 1985 budget included increasing personal allowances by up to 10%, twice the rate required to keep them abreast with inflation, a move he argued would take 800,000 families out of paying tax. A reform of National Insurance was announced, introducing lower National Insurance bands for employees, while the employers' contribution ceiling was changed to make all earnings subject to the 10.45% rather than just paying up to £265 a week as had previously been the case. Stamp duty was also reformed, with 15 different stamp duties abolished. Road tax was raised from £90 to £100, an increase that was seen as a significant milestone. Excise duty was increased on alcohol and cigarettes, with 1.5p on a pint of beer, 6p on a bottle of wine, 10p on a litre of spirits, 6p on a packet of cigarettes, and 4p on a gallon of petrol.

== Reaction ==
The potential cost the National Insurance changes would have for employers was of concern to some Conservative MPs, while Neil Kinnock, leader of the Labour Party and leader of the Opposition questioned how the chancellor could afford £2bn (Note: about £6bn at 2021 prices) to fight the miners, but could not afford to do the same to fight unemployment.
