= Lawson Boom =

Consequences of budgetary decisions

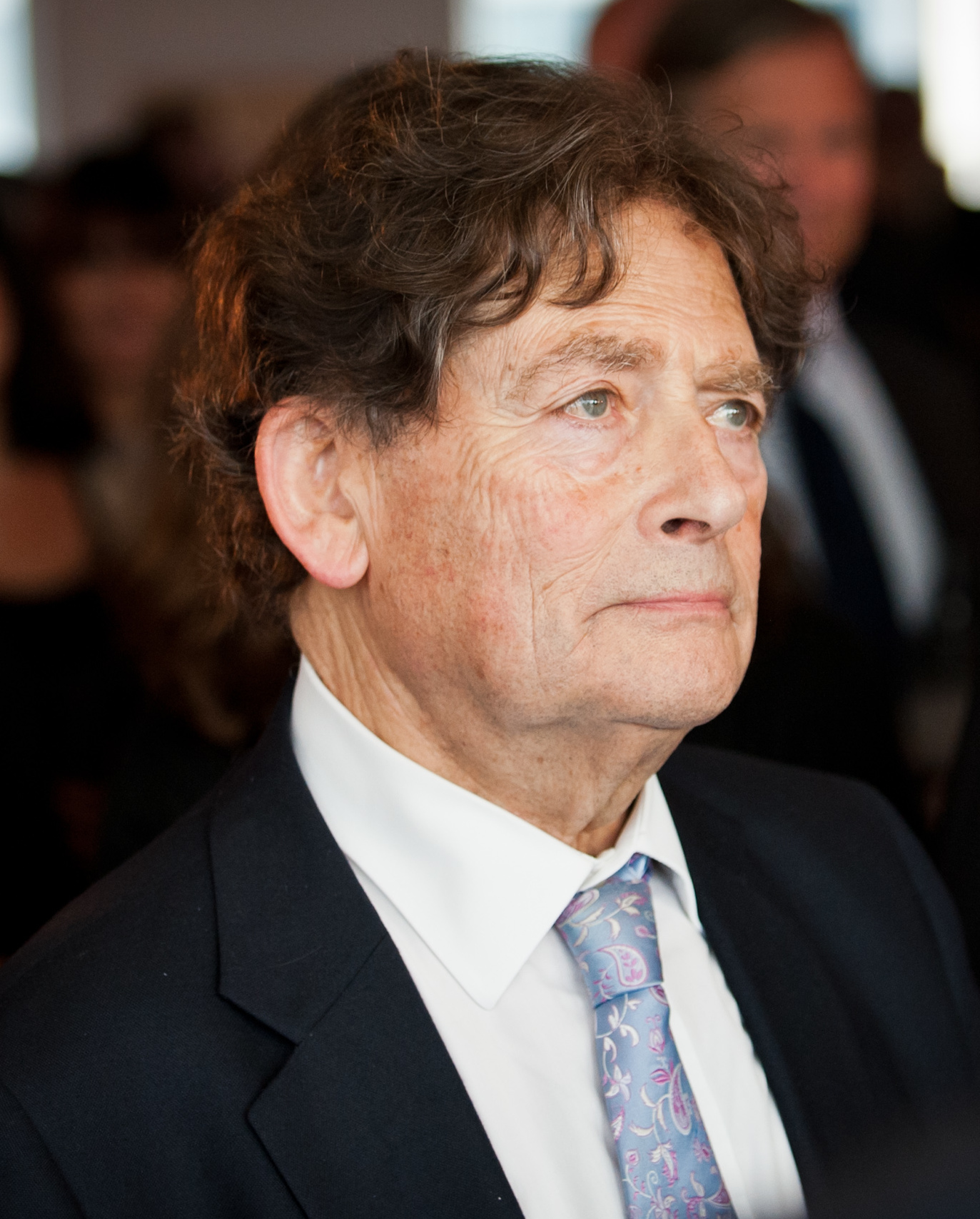
Nigel Lawson

The Lawson Boom was the macroeconomic conditions prevailing in the United Kingdom at the end of the 1980s, which became associated with the policies of Margaret Thatcher's Chancellor of the Exchequer, Nigel Lawson. The economic boom saw strong economic growth during the second half of the 1980s, sparking a sharp fall in unemployment, which was still in excess of 3 million at the end of 1986, but had fallen to 1.6 million (the lowest for some 10 years) by the end of 1989.

The term Lawson Boom was used by analogy with the phrase "The Barber Boom", an earlier period of rapid expansion under the tenure as chancellor of Anthony Barber in the Conservative government of Edward Heath. In his 1987 and 1988 budgets, Lawson cut standard rate income tax from 29p to 25p and cut the top rate to 40p. He did this because he believed that the economy was slowing down to a more sustainable rate, and "projected a huge surplus that justified his income tax cuts". However, before long inflation began to rise substantially, and as a result of his interest rate cuts, house prices rose by 20%. Just a few months later Lawson had to double interest rates and the UK was running its largest ever balance-of-payments deficit.

Critics of Lawson assert that a combination of the abandonment of monetarism, the adoption of a de facto exchange-rate target of 2.95 deutschmarks to the pound, and excessive fiscal laxity (in particular the 1988 budget) unleashed an inflationary spiral.

In 1990, Shadow Chancellor of the Exchequer John Smith referred to the period as the "Lawson boom" in a House of Commons debate, in which he said

The Greenwell Montagu gilt-edged research paper, UK inflation in the 1990s, highlights the tendency of British Governments "to over-expand demand and to preside over periods of over-rapid expansion, mistaking them for the beginning of the catching up of British economic performance with those of our competitors and the beginning of a virtuous circle." We have not heard those phrases from the Conservative party. The report continues "There have been three phases of this sort, all of which had serious consequences.

(a) Maudling's dash for growth 1963–64;
(b) Barber's boom, 1972–73;
(c) The Lawson boom, 1986–88.

— Hansard, 14 November 1990

The "dash for growth" had failed to save the Conservative government from electoral defeat at the hands of Labour in the 1964 general election, and was followed by a difficult period for the economy (during which unemployment nearly doubled) in the second half of the 1960s. The "Barber Boom" a decade later had contributed to a recession and was a factor in the Conservatives losing to Labour again after the February 1974 general election and was a major contributing factor in the subsequent 1976 sterling crisis.

The inflationary pressures of the Lawson Boom were one of the reasons given for the UK's entry into the European Exchange Rate Mechanism in October 1990, a move that was supposed to help restrain inflation (which had been approaching 10%) in the UK by "importing" the anti-inflationary credibility of the Bundesbank. However, the economy fell into its third recession in less than 20 years, with unemployment coming close to 3 million by the end of 1992, even though this time the Conservatives managed to gain re-election.

== See also ==
- Black Monday (1987) – worldwide stock-market crash
- Black Wednesday (1992 Sterling crisis)
