= 1988 United Kingdom budget =

- Presented: 15 March 1988
- Parliament: 50th
- Party: Conservative Party
- Chancellor: Nigel Lawson

The 1988 United Kingdom budget (sometimes referred to as the Giveaway budget) was delivered by Nigel Lawson, the Chancellor of the Exchequer, to the House of Commons on 15 March 1988. It was the fifth budget to be delivered by Lawson during his tenure as Chancellor, and marked major changes to taxation, with reductions in income tax and changes to inheritance tax rules, as well as changes to mortgage interest relief that prevented homebuyers from being able to pool mortgage allowances. The changes announced to mortgage relief ultimately helped to further fuel an ongoing property boom which led to a rise in inflation and an increase in interest rates. Due to frequent disruptions during the Chancellor's speech, Deputy Speaker Harold Walker was required to suspend proceedings in what was described as an outbreak of "grave disorder".

== Overview ==
Lawson believed the UK economy was slowing to a sustainable rate, and forecast a budget surplus which would enable him to make significant reductions in tax. Thus he hoped to boost the economy "by changing the structure of taxation". He abolished the 60% upper rate of income tax, meaning nobody would pay more than 40% on their earnings, while reducing the basic rate of income tax from 27% to 25%, mirroring the 2p reduction made in the 1987 budget. He also confirmed his intention to further reduce the basic rate to 20% at a future date. Furthermore, the personal tax allowance was increased by 7.4%, double the rate of inflation. Corporation tax was also reduced from 27% to 25% for smaller companies. Inheritance tax was simplified, with the four rates between 30% and 60% replaced by a single 40% rate, while the threshold at which inheritance tax was levied was raised from £90,000 to £120,000. It was also confirmed that multiple mortgage interest relief would end from August 1988. Rates of Capital Gains Tax were aligned with those for income tax, while any Capital Gains Tax on assets owned before 1982 was written off. Finally, excise duty was raised, with 1p on beer, 4p on wines and 3p on a packet of 20 cigarettes, but remained unchanged on spirits.

== Reaction ==
The budget was welcomed by Conservative MPs, but as the extent of the tax cuts became apparent, Labour MPs were heard to chant "shame" and "What about the National Health Service?". The 105-minute speech was beset by frequent interruptions, including one from Alex Salmond of the Scottish National Party, who was suspended from the House after describing the statement as "an obscenity", breaching parliamentary convention in the process. Further interruptions ultimately led Harold Walker, the House of Commons Deputy Speaker, to suspend proceedings for ten minutes because of "grave disorder having arisen in the House". Further afield, the budget was met with disappointment from companies in the City of London, which had hoped for stamp duty on share deals to be abolished. In the short term, Lawson's reputation was boosted, adding weight to his argument that the best way to control inflation was for the UK to join the Exchange Rate Mechanism, something with which he was at odds with Prime Minister Margaret Thatcher. But economic turmoil lay ahead.

== Legacy ==
Far from slowing down, economic growth was actually accelerating, fuelled by a property boom that saw house prices increasing by 20% a year. This was further exacerbated by the changes to mortgage interest relief which prompted an increase in the number of mortgages taken out by unmarried couples and friends keen to get on the property ladder before the changes came into effect. The number of mortgages increased by a fifth during the second and third quarters of 1988 compared to the same period in 1987, and within a few months of the 1988 budget, interest rates had doubled. By then, inflation had increased significantly, and the UK was running its largest ever balance-of-payment deficit. Many first-time buyers had taken out mortgages worth 95% of the value of their property, and ultimately found themselves in negative equity when house prices began to fall in 1989.

The recession of the early 1990s would see the UK run a series of budget deficits, along with the implementation of tax increases in an attempt to stabilise the situation. Lawson would subsequently argue that economic forecasters had underestimated the strength of the economic boom, while financial deregulation had been responsible for increases in lending, particularly to the housing market. But, in a 2018 Telegraph article in which he acknowledged the 1988 budget as "one of the most controversial Britain has seen", Tom Clougherty, of the Centre for Policy Studies, described it as "one of the most successful" and one that Lawson's successors were "still essentially colouring in the map that he drew".

One of the announcements from the 1988 budget to survive into the 21st Century was the 40% rate of Capital Gains Tax, which was changed to 18% for all taxpayers in the 2008 budget. The 1982 write-off date for asset ownership also continued to be used.

== See also ==
- Lawson Boom
