= Nigel Lawson =

British politician (1932–2023)

The Right Honourable The Lord Lawson of Blaby PC
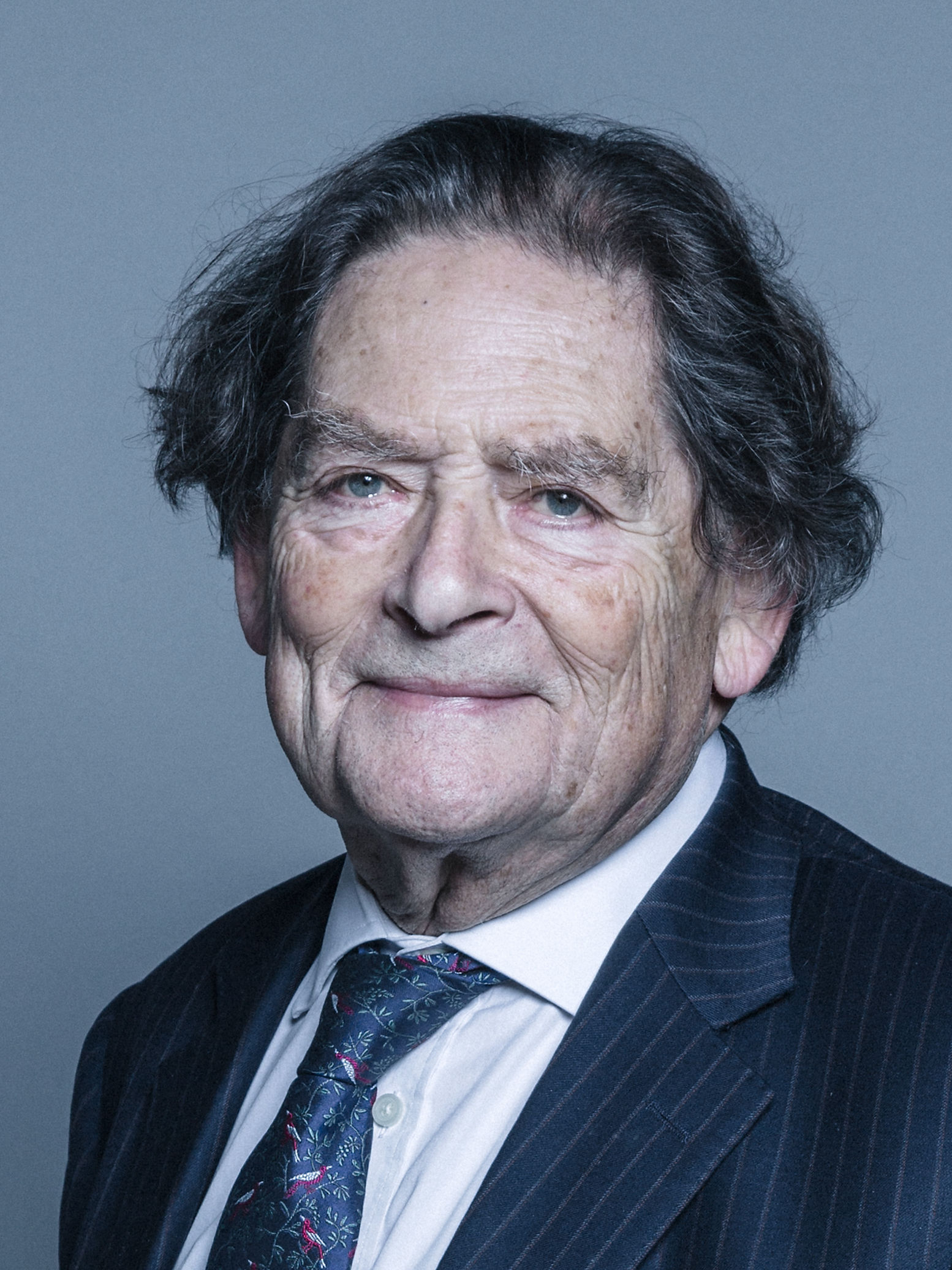
- Official portrait, 2018

Chancellor of the Exchequer
- In office 11 June 1983 – 26 October 1989
- Prime Minister: Margaret Thatcher
- Preceded by: Geoffrey Howe
- Succeeded by: John Major

Secretary of State for Energy
- In office 14 September 1981 – 11 June 1983
- Prime Minister: Margaret Thatcher
- Preceded by: David Howell
- Succeeded by: Peter Walker

Financial Secretary to the Treasury
- In office 4 May 1979 – 14 September 1981
- Prime Minister: Margaret Thatcher
- Preceded by: Robert Sheldon
- Succeeded by: Nicholas Ridley

Member of the House of Lords
- Lord Temporal
- Life peerage 1 July 1992 – 31 December 2022

Member of Parliament for Blaby
- In office 28 February 1974 – 16 March 1992
- Preceded by: Constituency created
- Succeeded by: Andrew Robathan

Personal details
- Born: Nigel Lawson; 11 March 1932 Hampstead, London, England
- Died: 3 April 2023 (aged 91) Eastbourne, England
- Party: Conservative
- Spouses: Vanessa Salmon (m. 1955; div. 1980); Thérèse Maclear (m. 1980; div. 2012)
- Children: 6, including Dominic and Nigella
- Education: Westminster School
- Alma mater: Christ Church, Oxford

Military service
- Allegiance: United Kingdom
- Branch/service: Royal Navy
- Years of service: 1954–1956
- Rank: Lieutenant commander
- Commands: HMS Gay Charger

Nigel Lawson, Baron Lawson of Blaby (11 March 1932 – 3 April 2023) was a British politician and journalist. A member of the Conservative Party, he served as Member of Parliament for Blaby in Leicestershire from 1974 to 1992, and served in Margaret Thatcher's Cabinet from 1981 to 1989. Prior to entering the Cabinet, he served as the Financial Secretary to the Treasury from May 1979 until his promotion to Secretary of State for Energy. He was appointed Chancellor of the Exchequer in June 1983 and served until his resignation in October 1989. In both Cabinet posts, Lawson was a key proponent of Thatcher's policies of privatisation of several key industries.

Lawson was a backbencher from 1989 until he retired in 1992 and sat in the House of Lords from 1992 until his retirement in 2022. He remained active in politics as the president of Conservatives for Britain, a campaign for Britain to leave the European Union, and was a prominent critic of the EU. He also founded and chaired a climate change denial group, the Global Warming Policy Foundation, and was an active supporter of Vote Leave.

Lawson was the father of six children, including Nigella Lawson, a food writer and celebrity cook, Dominic Lawson, a journalist, and Tom Lawson, headmaster of Eastbourne College.

== Early life and education ==
Nigel Lawson was born on 11 March 1932 to a non-Orthodox Jewish family living in Hampstead, London. His father, Ralph Lawson (1904–1982), was the owner of a tea-trading firm in the City of London, while his mother, Joan Elizabeth (née Davis, died 1998), was also from a prosperous family of stockbrokers. His paternal grandfather, Gustav Leibson, a merchant from Mitau (now Jelgava in Latvia), changed his name from Leibson to Lawson in 1925, having become a British subject in 1911.

Lawson was a great-nephew of the pianist Myra Hess.

Lawson was educated at Westminster School in London (following in his father's footsteps), and won a mathematics scholarship to Christ Church, Oxford, where he gained a first-class honours degree in philosophy, politics and economics.

== Life and career ==
For two years from 1954, Lawson carried out his National Service as a Royal Navy officer, during which time he commanded the fast-patrol boat HMS Gay Charger.

Having been turned down for a career at the Foreign Office, Lawson joined the Financial Times as a journalist in 1956, subsequently writing the Lex column. He progressed to become City editor of The Sunday Telegraph in 1961, where he introduced Jim Slater's Capitalist investing column.

=== Early political career ===
In 1963, Lawson was recruited by Conservative Central Office to assist with speech-writing for prime ministers Harold Macmillan and Alec Douglas-Home in the lead-up to the 1964 general election.

After returning to journalism as editor of The Spectator from 1966 to 1970, Lawson was selected as the Conservative candidate for the Eton and Slough constituency in 1968. He contested the seat unsuccessfully at the 1970 general election, before becoming Member of Parliament (MP) for Blaby in Leicestershire in February 1974, holding the seat until he retired at the 1992 general election.

In 1977, while an opposition whip, Lawson co-ordinated tactics with rebellious government backbenchers Jeff Rooker and Audrey Wise to secure legislation providing for the automatic indexation of tax thresholds to prevent the tax burden being increased by inflation (typically in excess of 10% per annum during that parliament).

=== In government ===
==== Financial Secretary to the Treasury ====
On the election of Margaret Thatcher's government, Lawson was appointed to the post of Financial Secretary to the Treasury. Although this is the fourth-ranking political position in the UK Treasury, Lawson's energy in office was reflected in such measures as the ending of unofficial state controls on mortgage lending, the abolition of exchange controls in October 1979 and the publication of the Medium Term financial Strategy. This document set the course for both the monetary and fiscal sides of the new government's economic policy, though the extent to which the subsequent trajectory of policy and outcome matched that projected is still a matter for debate.

==== Secretary of State for Energy ====
In the Cabinet reshuffle of September 1981, Lawson was promoted to the position of Secretary of State for Energy. In this role his most significant action was to prepare for what he saw as an inevitable full-scale strike in the coal industry (then state-owned since nationalisation by the post-war Labour Party government of Clement Attlee) over the closure of deep coal mines whose uneconomic operation accounted for the coal industry's business losses and consequent requirement for state subsidy. He was a key proponent of the Thatcher government's privatisation policy. During his tenure at the Department of Energy he set the course for the later privatisations of the gas and electricity industries and on his return to the Treasury he worked closely with the Department of Trade and Industry in privatising British Airways, British Telecom, and British Gas.

==== Chancellor of the Exchequer ====
[A] mixture of free markets, financial discipline, firm control over public expenditure, tax cuts, nationalism, "Victorian values" (of the Samuel Smiles self-help variety), privatisation and a dash of populism.

— Lawson's definition of Thatcherism

Following the Thatcher government's re-election in 1983, Lawson was appointed Chancellor of the Exchequer, succeeding Geoffrey Howe. The early years of Lawson's chancellorship were associated with tax reform. The 1984 budget reformed corporate taxes by a combination of reduced rates and reduced allowances. The 1985 budget continued the trend of shifting from direct to indirect taxes by reducing National Insurance contributions for the lower-paid while extending the base of value-added tax.

During these two years, Lawson's public image remained low-key, but from the 1986 budget (in which he resumed the reduction of the standard rate of personal income tax from the 30 per cent rate to which it had been lowered in Howe's 1979 budget), his stock rose as unemployment began to fall from the middle of 1986 (employment growth having resumed over three years earlier). Lawson also changed the budget deficit from £10.5 billion (3.7 per cent of GDP) in 1983 to a budget surplus of £3.9 billion in 1988 and £4.1 billion in 1989, the year of his resignation. During these years, however, the UK's current account deficit similarly rose from below 1 per cent of GDP in 1986 to almost 5 per cent in 1989, with Lawson asserting that an external deficit based on private-sector behaviour is no reason for concern. During his tenure, the rate of taxation also came down. The basic rate was reduced from 30 per cent in 1983 to 25 per cent by 1988. The top rate of tax also came down from 60 per cent to 40 per cent in 1988, and the four other higher rates were removed, leaving a system of personal taxation in which there was no rate anywhere in excess of 40 per cent.

In 1986 the City of London's financial markets were deregulated in the so-called "Big Bang". In an interview in 2010, Lawson said that an unintended consequence of the Big Bang and the associated end of the separation that had existed between merchant and retail banking was the 2008 financial crisis.

The trajectory taken by the UK economy from this point on is typically described as "The Lawson Boom" by analogy with the phrase "The Barber Boom" which describes an earlier period of rapid expansion under the tenure as chancellor of Anthony Barber in the Conservative government of Edward Heath (1970–1974). Critics of Lawson assert that a combination of the abandonment of monetarism, the adoption of a de facto exchange-rate target of 3 Deutsche Marks to the pound, and excessive fiscal laxity (in particular the 1988 budget) unleashed an inflationary spiral.

In his defence, Lawson attributed the boom largely to the effects of various measures of financial deregulation. Insofar as Lawson acknowledged policy errors, he attributed them to a failure to raise interest rates during 1986 and considered that had Thatcher not vetoed the UK joining the European Exchange Rate Mechanism in November 1985 it might have been possible to adjust to these beneficial changes in the arena of microeconomics with less macroeconomics turbulence. Lawson also ascribed the difficulty of conducting monetary policy to Goodhart's law.

Lawson's tax cuts, beginning in 1986, resulted in the "Lawson Boom" of the British economy, which halved unemployment from more than 3,000,000 by the end of 1989. However, this may have led to a rise in inflation from 3 per cent to more than 8 per cent during 1988, which resulted in interest rates doubling to 15 per cent in the space of 18 months, and remaining high despite the 1990–1992 recession which saw unemployment rise nearly as high as the level seen before the boom began.

Lawson reflected on the 1987 general election in his memoir and wrote that the 1987 manifesto was not thought through properly and if it had not been for the economic growth of the country at the time, then the manifesto would have been a disaster because "as it was, it was merely an embarrassment".

The March 1988 budget was remembered for taking almost two hours to deliver due to continuous interruptions and protest from opposition members. Scottish National Party MP Alex Salmond was suspended from the House, and several MPs voted against the amendment of the law bill (which is typically agreed by all members of the House).

Lawson opposed the introduction of the Community Charge (nicknamed "the poll tax") as a replacement for the previous rating system for the local financing element of local government revenue. His dissent was confined to deliberations within the Cabinet, where he found few allies and where he was overruled by the Prime Minister and by the ministerial team of the department responsible (Department of the Environment).

The issue of exchange-rate mechanism membership continued to fester between Lawson and Thatcher and was exacerbated by the re-employment by Thatcher of Alan Walters as a personal economic adviser.

==== Resignation ====
After a further year in office in these circumstances, Lawson felt that public criticism from Walters (who favoured a floating exchange rate) was making his job impossible and he resigned. He was succeeded in the office of chancellor by John Major.

Lawson's six-year tenure as Chancellor of the Exchequer was longer than that of any of his predecessors since David Lloyd George, who served from 1908 to 1915. Both men's records were subsequently beaten by Labour's Gordon Brown, who was chancellor from 1997 to 2007.

=== Retirement ===
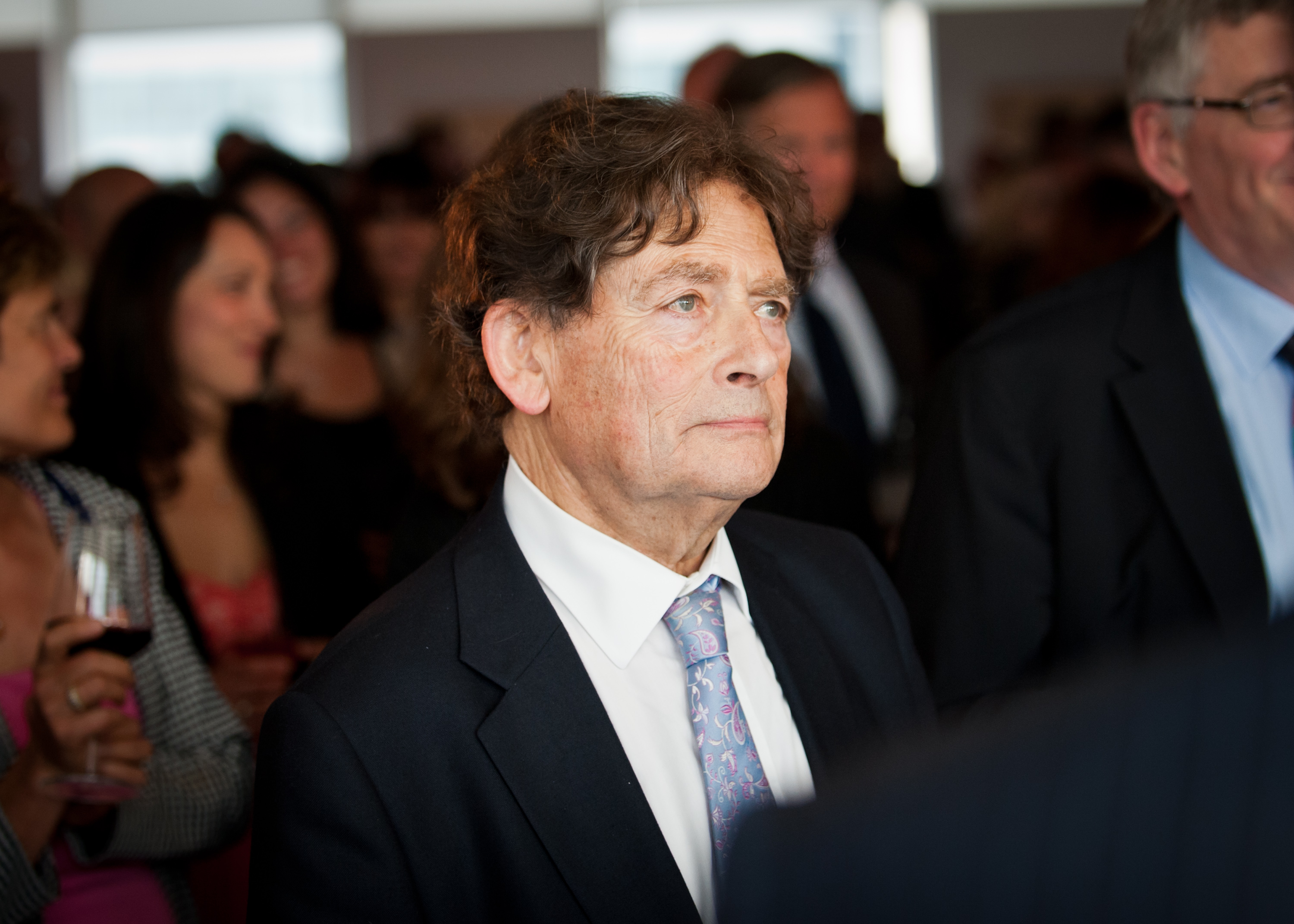
Lawson in 2013

After retiring from front-bench politics, Lawson decided to tackle his weight problem. He was 5 feet 9 inches (175 cm) tall; he lost five stone (70 pounds, 30 kg) from 17 stone, or 238 pounds (108 kg) to 12 stone, or 168 pounds (76 kilograms) – (BMI 34 to 24) in a matter of a few months, dramatically changing his appearance, and went on to publish the best-selling The Nigel Lawson Diet Book.

On 1 July 1992 Lawson was given a life peerage as Baron Lawson of Blaby, of Newnham in the County of Northamptonshire.

In 1996 Lawson appeared on the BBC satirical and topical quiz show Have I Got News for You, in which he secured his team a last-minute victory. He occasionally appeared as a guest on his daughter Nigella's cookery shows.

Lawson served on the advisory board of the Conservative magazine Standpoint.

In 2013, Lawson advocated Britain leaving the European Union. He argued that "economic gains [from leaving the EU] would substantially outweigh the costs". In the 2016 EU referendum, he supported Leave and was appointed chairman of the Vote Leave campaign.

==== Corporate roles ====
- 2007: Chairman of Central Europe Trust Company Ltd (CET)
- 2007: Chairman of Oxford Investment Partners

=== Expenses scandal ===
During the United Kingdom parliamentary expenses scandal, it was reported that Lawson claimed £16,000 in overnight allowances by registering his farmhouse in Gascony as his main residence.

=== Climate change ===
Lawson believed that the impact of man-made global warming had been exaggerated. He was a highly active climate change denier and used what influence he had as a former cabinet minister and member of the Lords to try to give his views greater traction.

In 2004, along with six others, Lawson wrote a letter to The Times opposing the Kyoto Protocol and claiming that there were substantial scientific uncertainties surrounding climate change. In 2005, the House of Lords Economics Affairs Select Committee, with Lawson as a member, undertook an inquiry into climate change. In their report, the committee recommended the HM Treasury take a more active role in climate policy, questioned the objectivity of the IPCC process, and suggested changes in the UK's contribution to future international climate change negotiations. The report cited a mismatch between the economic costs and benefits of climate policy and also criticised the greenhouse gas emission reduction targets set in the Kyoto Protocol. In response to the report, Michael Grubb, chief economist of the Carbon Trust, wrote an article in Prospect magazine, defending the Kyoto Protocol and describing the committee's report as being "strikingly inconsistent". Lawson responded to Grubb's article, describing it as an example of the "intellectual bankruptcy of the [...] climate change establishment". Lawson also said that Kyoto's approach was "wrong-headed" and called on the IPCC to be "shut down".

At about the same time as the release of the House of Lords report, the UK Government launched the Stern Review, an inquiry undertaken by the HM Treasury and headed by Lord Stern of Brentford. According to the Stern Review, published in 2006, the potential costs of climate change far exceed the costs of a programme to stabilise the climate. Lawson's lecture to the Centre for Policy Studies (CPS) think tank, published 1 November 2006, opposed the Stern Review and advocated adaptation to changes in global climate rather than reducing greenhouse gas emissions.

In 2008, Lawson published a book expanding on his 2006 lecture to the CPS, An Appeal to Reason: A Cool Look at Global Warming. He argued the case that, although global warming is happening, the impact of these changes will be relatively moderate rather than apocalyptic. He criticised those "alarmist" politicians and scientists who predict catastrophe unless urgent action is taken.

In July 2008 the Conservative magazine Standpoint published a transcript of a double interview with Lawson and Conservative Policy Chief Oliver Letwin, in which Lawson described Letwin's views on global warming as "pie in the sky" and called on him and the Conservative frontbench to "get real".

On 23 November 2009 Lawson founded and became chairman of a new think tank, The Global Warming Policy Foundation (GWPF), that is registered as an education charity.

In 2011 Bob Ward of the Grantham Research Institute said that the GWPF was "spreading errors" and "the 'facts'" Lawson "repeats are demonstrably inaccurate". Ward also criticised Lawson for repeating in a 2010 BBC radio debate that Antarctic ice volumes were unchanged even after his error was highlighted by his opponent, Professor Kevin Anderson. Ward said that Lawson provided no evidence to back his claim which is contrary to satellite measurements, and Lawson similarly incorrectly implied that the correlation between CO_{2} and sea levels was uncertain as well as that sea levels were rising more slowly since 1950 than before it.

The Charity Commission requires that statements by campaigning charities "must be factually accurate and have a legitimate evidence base". They reviewed the GWPF, which was subsequently split with its campaigning arm and renamed the Global Warming Policy Forum without charitable status, while the charitable section retained the original title. Lawson's son, Dominic Lawson, is also a climate change denier, taking a similar viewpoint as his father in his columns in the Independent on Sunday.

In a BBC Radio interview in August 2017, Lawson claimed that "official figures" showed "average world temperature has slightly declined" over the preceding decade and that experts in the IPCC found no increase in extreme weather events. In a follow-up programme on the BBC's presentation of these claims, Peter A. Stott of the Met Office said Lawson was wrong on both points.

=== Economy ===
Lawson was a critic of David Cameron's coalition government economic policy, describing spending cuts consultation plans as a "PR ploy". In November 2011, he called for the "orderly" dismantling of the eurozone.

== In the media ==
Lawson was interviewed about the rise of Thatcherism for the 2006 BBC TV documentary series Tory! Tory! Tory!.

In 2010 he appeared on the Analysis programme to discuss banking reform. Lawson said that an unintended consequence of the 1986 Big Bang saw investment banks merge with high street banks and put their depositors' savings at risk.

In 2019, he appeared on the BBC documentary series Thatcher: A Very British Revolution, and discussed Thatcher's rise and fall.

In a debate with other former cabinet ministers and prominent journalists, Lawson argued that political life is more in need of ideas and direction than grand political visions.

== Personal life ==
In 1955 Lawson married Vanessa Mary Addison Salmon (1936−1985), granddaughter of the Lyons Corner House chairman Alfred Salmon, and had four children:

- Dominic Ralph Campden Lawson (born 1956), journalist
- Nigella Lucy Lawson (born 1960), cook and author
- Thomasina Posy Lawson (1961–1993), who died from breast cancer at the age of 32
- Horatia Holly Lawson (born 1966)

After his first marriage was dissolved in 1980, he married Thérèse Mary Maclear (1947–2023), daughter of Henry Charles Maclear Bate, the same year. They had two children:

- Thomas Nigel Maclear Lawson (born 1976), headmaster of Eastbourne College since 2016
- Emily Hero Lawson (born 1981), television producer

Lawson's second marriage was dissolved in 2012. In later life, he was in a relationship with Dr Tina Jennings, a visiting fellow at St Antony's College, Oxford.

=== Residence in France ===
In retirement, Lawson divided his time between his flat in London and a neoclassical farmhouse in Vic-Fezensac in the Gers department of France. In 2018 it was reported that, following Brexit, he had applied for permanent residency in France. However, in 2019, he said that he remained a tax resident of the UK and was selling his house in France.

=== Death and tributes ===
Lawson died at his home in Eastbourne from bronchopneumonia on 3 April 2023, at the age of 91. Following the announcement of his death, Prime Minister Rishi Sunak called Lawson an "inspiration to me" and to other Conservative politicians. Labour Party leader Keir Starmer commented that he was a "real powerhouse".

=== In popular culture ===
Lawson has appeared as a character in various biographical works, including the 2009 BBC Two film Margaret (played by Martin Chamberlain) and the 2025 Channel 4 drama Brian and Maggie (2025) (played by Ivan Kaye).

== Published works ==
- Blake, Robert; Peregrine Worsthorne; David Howell; Nigel Lawson (1966). Conservatism Today: Four Personal Points of View. London: Conservative Political Centre.
- Bruce-Gardyne, Jock; Nigel Lawson (1976). The Power Game: An Examination of Decision-making in Government. Hamden, Conn.: Archon Books. ISBN 978-0-208-01598-3.
- Lawson, Nigel (1981). Thatcherism in Practice: A Progress Report. London: Conservative Political Centre. ISBN 978-0-85070-662-8 – via Margaret Thatcher Foundation.
- Lawson, Nigel; Alan Budd (1988). The State of the Market. Institute of Economic Affairs. ISBN 978-0-255-36215-3.
- Lawson, Nigel (1992). The View from No. 11: Memoirs of a Tory Radical. London: Bantam. ISBN 978-0-593-02218-4.
- — (1996). The Nigel Lawson Diet Book. London: Michael Joseph. ISBN 978-0-7181-4175-2.
- — (1999). The Retreat of the State. Norwich: Canterbury Press. ISBN 978-1-85311-316-1.
- — (2008). An Appeal to Reason: A Cool Look at Global Warming. New York: Overlook Duckworth. ISBN 978-1-59020-084-1.

== See also ==
- The Great Global Warming Swindle

Media offices
Preceded by Iain Macleod	Editor of The Spectator; 1966–1970	Succeeded by George Gale
Parliament of the United Kingdom
New constituency	Member of Parliament for Blaby; 1974–1992	Succeeded by Andrew Robathan
Political offices
Preceded by Robert Sheldon	Financial Secretary to the Treasury; 1979–1981	Succeeded by Nicholas Ridley
Preceded by David Howell	Secretary of State for Energy; 1981–1983	Succeeded by Peter Walker
Preceded by Geoffrey Howe	Chancellor of the Exchequer; 1983–1989	Succeeded by John Major
Preceded by Geoffrey Howe	Second Lord of the Treasury; 1983–1989	Succeeded by John Major
