= List of 1983 British incumbents =

This is a list of 1983 British incumbents.

== Government ==
- Monarch
  - Head of State – Elizabeth II, Queen of the United Kingdom (1952–2022)
- Prime Minister
  - Head of Government – Margaret Thatcher, Prime Minister of the United Kingdom (1979–1990)
- First Lord of the Treasury
  - Margaret Thatcher, First Lord of the Treasury (1979–1990)
- Chancellor of the Exchequer
  1. Sir Geoffrey Howe, Chancellor of the Exchequer (1979–1983)
  2. Nigel Lawson, Chancellor of the Exchequer (1983–1989)
- Second Lord of the Treasury
  1. Sir Geoffrey Howe, Second Lord of the Treasury (1979–1983)
  2. Nigel Lawson, Second Lord of the Treasury (1983–1989)
- Secretary of State for Foreign and Commonwealth Affairs
  1. Francis Pym, Secretary of State for Foreign and Commonwealth Affairs (1982–1983)
  2. Sir Geoffrey Howe, Secretary of State for Foreign and Commonwealth Affairs (1983–1989)
- Secretary of State for the Home Department
  1. William Whitelaw, Secretary of State for the Home Department (1979–1983)
  2. Leon Brittan, Secretary of State for the Home Department (1983–1985)
- Secretary of State for Transport
  1. David Howell, Secretary of State for Transport (1981–1983)
  2. Nicholas Ridley, Secretary of State for Transport (1983–1986)
- Secretary of State for Scotland
  - George Younger, Secretary of State for Scotland (1979–1986)
- Secretary of State for Social Services
  - Norman Fowler, Secretary of State for Social Services (1981–1987)
- Secretary of State for Northern Ireland
  - James Prior, Secretary of State for Northern Ireland (1981–1984)
- Secretary of State for Defence
  1. John Nott, Secretary of State for Defence (1981–1983)
  2. Michael Heseltine, Secretary of State for Defence (1983–1986)
- Secretary of State for Industry
  1. Patrick Jenkin, Secretary of State for Industry (1981–1983)
  - See Secretary of State for Trade and Industry for post-1983
- Secretary of State for Trade
  1. Francis Cockfield, Baron Cockfield, Secretary of State for Trade (1982–1983)
  - See Secretary of State for Trade and Industry for post-1983
- Secretary of State for Trade and Industry
  - See Secretary of State for Trade and Secretary of State for Industry for pre-1983 incumbents
  1. Cecil Edward Parkinson, Secretary of State for Trade and Industry (1983)
  2. Norman Tebbit, Secretary of State for Trade and Industry (1983–1985)
- Secretary of State for Education and Science
  - Sir Keith Joseph, Bt., Secretary of State for Education and Science (1981–1986)
- Secretary of State for Wales
  - Nicholas Edwards, Secretary of State for Wales (1979–1987)
- Lord Privy Seal
  1. Janet Young, Baroness Young, Lord Privy Seal (1982–1983)
  2. John Biffen, Lord Privy Seal (1983–1987)
- Leader of the House of Commons
  - John Biffen, Leader of the House of Commons (1982–1987)
- Lord President of the Council
  1. John Biffen, Lord President of the Council (1982–1983)
  2. William Whitelaw, 1st Viscount Whitelaw, Lord President of the Council (1983–1988)
- Lord Chancellor
  - Quintin Hogg, Baron Hailsham of St Marylebone, Lord Chancellor (1979–1987)
- Chancellor of the Duchy of Lancaster
  1. Cecil Parkinson, Chancellor of the Duchy of Lancaster (1982–1983)
  2. Francis Cockfield, Baron Cockfield, Chancellor of the Duchy of Lancaster (1983–1984)

== Religion ==
- Archbishop of Canterbury
  - Robert Runcie, Archbishop of Canterbury (1980–1991)
- Archbishop of York
  1. Stuart Blanch, Archbishop of York (1975–1983; retired before 5 September)
  2. John Habgood, Archbishop of York (1983–1995; installed 18 November)
