= List of 1982 British incumbents =

This is a list of 1982 British incumbents.

== Government ==
- Monarch
  - Head of State – Elizabeth II, Queen of the United Kingdom (1952–2022)
- Prime Minister
  - Head of Government – Margaret Thatcher, Prime Minister of the United Kingdom (1979–1990)
- First Lord of the Treasury
  - Margaret Thatcher, First Lord of the Treasury (1979–1990)
- Chancellor of the Exchequer
  - Sir Geoffrey Howe, Chancellor of the Exchequer (1979–1983)
- Second Lord of the Treasury
  - Sir Geoffrey Howe, Second Lord of the Treasury (1979–1983)
- Secretary of State for Foreign and Commonwealth Affairs
  1. Peter Carington, 6th Baron Carrington, Secretary of State for Foreign and Commonwealth Affairs (1979–1982)
  2. Francis Pym, Secretary of State for Foreign and Commonwealth Affairs (1982–1983)
- Secretary of State for the Home Department
  - William Whitelaw, Secretary of State for the Home Department (1979–1983)
- Secretary of State for Transport
  - David Howell, Secretary of State for Transport (1981–1983)
- Secretary of State for Scotland
  - George Younger, Secretary of State for Scotland (1979–1986)
- Secretary of State for Social Services
  - Norman Fowler, Secretary of State for Social Services (1981–1987)
- Secretary of State for Northern Ireland
  - James Prior, Secretary of State for Northern Ireland (1981–1984)
- Secretary of State for Defence
  - John Nott, Secretary of State for Defence (1981–1983)
- Secretary of State for Industry
  - Patrick Jenkin, Secretary of State for Industry (1981–1983)
- Secretary of State for Trade
  1. John Biffen, Secretary of State for Trade (1981–1982)
  2. Francis Cockfield, Baron Cockfield, Secretary of State for Trade (1982–1983)
- Secretary of State for Education and Science
  - Sir Keith Joseph, Bt., Secretary of State for Education and Science (1981–1986)
- Secretary of State for Wales
  - Nicholas Edwards, Secretary of State for Wales (1979–1987)
- Lord Privy Seal
  1. Humphrey Atkins, Lord Privy Seal (1981–1982)
  2. Janet Young, Baroness Young, Lord Privy Seal (1982–1983)
- Leader of the House of Commons
  1. Francis Pym, Leader of the House of Commons (1981–1982)
  2. John Biffen, Leader of the House of Commons (1982–1987)
- Lord President of the Council
  1. Francis Pym, Lord President of the Council (1981–1982)
  2. John Biffen, Lord President of the Council (1982–1983)
- Lord Chancellor
  - Quintin Hogg, Baron Hailsham of St Marylebone, Lord Chancellor (1979–1987)
- Chancellor of the Duchy of Lancaster
  1. Janet Mary Young, Baroness Young, Chancellor of the Duchy of Lancaster (1981–1982)
  2. Cecil Parkinson, Chancellor of the Duchy of Lancaster (1982–1983)

== Religion ==
- Archbishop of Canterbury
  - Robert Runcie, Archbishop of Canterbury (1980–1991)
- Archbishop of York
  - Stuart Blanch, Archbishop of York (1975–1983)
