= List of 1981 British incumbents =

This is a list of 1981 British incumbents.

== Government ==
- Monarch
  - Head of State — Elizabeth II, Queen of the United Kingdom (1952–2022)
- Prime Minister
  - Head of Government — Margaret Thatcher, Prime Minister of the United Kingdom (1979–1990)
- First Lord of the Treasury
  - Margaret Thatcher, First Lord of the Treasury (1979–1990)
- Chancellor of the Exchequer
  - Sir Geoffrey Howe, Chancellor of the Exchequer (1979–1983)
- Second Lord of the Treasury
  - Sir Geoffrey Howe, Second Lord of the Treasury (1979–1983)
- Secretary of State for Foreign and Commonwealth Affairs
  - Peter Carington, 6th Baron Carrington, Secretary of State for Foreign and Commonwealth Affairs (1979–1982)
- Secretary of State for the Home Department
  - William Whitelaw, Secretary of State for the Home Department (1979–1983)
- Secretary of State for Transport
  1. Norman Fowler, Minister for Transport (1979–1981)
  2. Norman Fowler, Secretary of State for Transport (1981)
  3. David Howell, Secretary of State for Transport (1981–1983)
- Secretary of State for Scotland
  - George Younger, Secretary of State for Scotland (1979–1986)
- Secretary of State for Social Services
  1. Patrick Jenkin, Secretary of State for Social Services (1979–1981)
  2. Norman Fowler, Secretary of State for Social Services (1981–1987)
- Secretary of State for Northern Ireland
  1. Humphrey Atkins, Secretary of State for Northern Ireland (1979–1981)
  2. James Prior, Secretary of State for Northern Ireland (1981–1984)
- Secretary of State for Defence
  1. Francis Pym, Secretary of State for Defence (1979–1981)
  2. John Nott, Secretary of State for Defence (1981–1983)
- Secretary of State for Industry
  1. Sir Keith Joseph, Bt., Secretary of State for Industry (1979–1981)
  2. Patrick Jenkin, Secretary of State for Industry (1981–1983)
- Secretary of State for Trade
  1. John Nott, Secretary of State for Trade (1979–1981)
  2. John Biffen, Secretary of State for Trade (1981–1982)
- Secretary of State for Education and Science
  1. Mark Carlisle, Secretary of State for Education and Science (1979–1981)
  2. Sir Keith Joseph, Bt., Secretary of State for Education and Science (1981–1986)
- Secretary of State for Wales
  - Nicholas Edwards, Secretary of State for Wales (1979–1987)
- Lord Privy Seal
  1. Sir Ian Gilmour, Lord Privy Seal (1979–1981)
  2. Humphrey Atkins, Lord Privy Seal (1981–1982)
- Leader of the House of Commons
  1. Norman St John-Stevas, Leader of the House of Commons (1979–1981)
  2. Francis Pym, Leader of the House of Commons (1981–1982)
- Lord President of the Council
  1. Christopher Soames, Baron Soames, Lord President of the Council (1979–1981)
  2. Francis Pym, Lord President of the Council (1981–1982)
- Lord Chancellor
  - Quintin Hogg, Baron Hailsham of St Marylebone, Lord Chancellor (1979–1987)
- Chancellor of the Duchy of Lancaster
  1. Norman Arthur Francis St John-Stevas, Chancellor of the Duchy of Lancaster (1979–1981)
  2. Janet Mary Young, Baroness Young, Chancellor of the Duchy of Lancaster (1981–1982)

== Religion ==
- Archbishop of Canterbury
  - Robert Runcie, Archbishop of Canterbury (1980–1991)
- Archbishop of York
  - Stuart Blanch, Archbishop of York (1975–1983)
