= List of 1979 British incumbents =

This is a list of 1979 British incumbents.

== Government ==
- Monarch
  - Head of State - Elizabeth II, Queen of the United Kingdom (1952–2022)
- Prime Minister
  1. Head of Government - James Callaghan, Prime Minister of the United Kingdom (1976–1979)
  2. Head of Government - Margaret Thatcher, Prime Minister of the United Kingdom (1979–1990)
- First Lord of the Treasury
  1. James Callaghan, First Lord of the Treasury (1976–1979)
  2. Margaret Thatcher, First Lord of the Treasury (1979–1990)
- Chancellor of the Exchequer
  1. Denis Healey, Chancellor of the Exchequer (1974–1979)
  2. Sir Geoffrey Howe, Chancellor of the Exchequer (1979–1983)
- Second Lord of the Treasury
  1. Denis Healey, Second Lord of the Treasury (1974–1979)
  2. Sir Geoffrey Howe, Second Lord of the Treasury (1979–1983)
- Secretary of State for Foreign and Commonwealth Affairs
  1. Dr David Owen, Secretary of State for Foreign and Commonwealth Affairs (1977–1979)
  2. Peter Carington, 6th Baron Carrington, Secretary of State for Foreign and Commonwealth Affairs (1979–1982)
- Secretary of State for the Home Department
  1. Merlyn Rees, Secretary of State for the Home Department (1976–1979)
  2. William Whitelaw, Secretary of State for the Home Department (1979–1983)
- Secretary of State for Transport
  1. Bill Rodgers, Secretary of State for Transport (1976–1979)
  2. Norman Fowler, Minister for Transport (1979–1981)
- Secretary of State for Scotland
  1. Bruce Millan, Secretary of State for Scotland (1976–1979)
  2. George Younger, Secretary of State for Scotland (1979–1986)
- Secretary of State for Social Services
  1. David Ennals, Secretary of State for Social Services (1976–1979)
  2. Patrick Jenkin, Secretary of State for Social Services (1979–1981)
- Secretary of State for Northern Ireland
  1. Roy Mason, Secretary of State for Northern Ireland (1976–1979)
  2. Humphrey Atkins, Secretary of State for Northern Ireland (1979–1981)
- Secretary of State for Defence
  1. Frederick Mulley, Secretary of State for Defence (1976–1979)
  2. Francis Pym, Secretary of State for Defence (1979–1981)
- Secretary of State for Industry
  1. Eric Varley, Secretary of State for Industry (1975–1979)
  2. Sir Keith Joseph, Bt., Secretary of State for Industry (1979–1981)
- Secretary of State for Trade
  1. John Smith, Secretary of State for Trade (1978–1979)
  2. John Nott, Secretary of State for Trade (1979–1981)
- Secretary of State for Education and Science
  1. Shirley Williams, Secretary of State for Education and Science (1976–1979)
  2. Mark Carlisle, Secretary of State for Education and Science (1979–1981)
- Secretary of State for Wales
  1. John Morris, Secretary of State for Wales (1974–1979)
  2. Nicholas Edwards, Secretary of State for Wales (1979–1987)
- Lord Privy Seal
  1. Fred Peart, Baron Peart, Lord Privy Seal (1976–1979)
  2. Sir Ian Gilmour, Lord Privy Seal (1979–1981)
- Leader of the House of Commons
  1. Michael Foot, Leader of the House of Commons (1976–1979)
  2. Norman St John-Stevas, Leader of the House of Commons (1979–1981)
- Lord President of the Council
  1. Michael Foot, Lord President of the Council (1976–1979)
  2. Christopher Soames, Baron Soames, Lord President of the Council (1979–1981)
- Lord Chancellor
  1. Elwyn Jones, Baron Elwyn-Jones, Lord Chancellor (1974–1979)
  2. Quintin Hogg, Baron Hailsham of St Marylebone, Lord Chancellor (1979–1987)
- Chancellor of the Duchy of Lancaster
  1. Harold Lever, Chancellor of the Duchy of Lancaster (1974–1979)
  2. Norman St John-Stevas, Chancellor of the Duchy of Lancaster (1979–1981)

== Religion ==
- Archbishop of Canterbury
  - Donald Coggan, Archbishop of Canterbury (1974–1980)
- Archbishop of York
  - Stuart Blanch, Archbishop of York (1975–1983)

== Dukes ==
- Duke of Abercorn
  1. James Edward Hamilton, 4th Duke of Abercorn (1953–1979)
  2. James Hamilton, 5th Duke of Abercorn (1979-)
