= List of 1986 British incumbents =

This is a list of 1986 British incumbents.

== Government ==
- Monarch
  - Head of State – Elizabeth II, Queen of the United Kingdom (1952–2022)
- Prime Minister
  - Head of Government – Margaret Thatcher, Prime Minister of the United Kingdom (1979–1990)
- First Lord of the Treasury
  - Margaret Thatcher, First Lord of the Treasury (1979–1990)
- Chancellor of the Exchequer
  - Nigel Lawson, Chancellor of the Exchequer (1983–1989)
- Second Lord of the Treasury
  - Nigel Lawson, Second Lord of the Treasury (1983–1989)
- Secretary of State for Foreign and Commonwealth Affairs
  - Sir Geoffrey Howe, Secretary of State for Foreign and Commonwealth Affairs (1983–1989)
- Secretary of State for the Home Department
  - Douglas Hurd, Secretary of State for the Home Department (1985–1989)
- Secretary of State for Transport
  1. Nicholas Ridley, Secretary of State for Transport (1983–1986)
  2. John Moore, Secretary of State for Transport (1986–1987)
- Secretary of State for Scotland
  1. George Younger, Secretary of State for Scotland (1979–1986)
  2. Malcolm Rifkind, Secretary of State for Scotland (1986–1990)
- Secretary of State for Social Services
  - Norman Fowler, Secretary of State for Social Services (1981–1987)
- Secretary of State for Northern Ireland
  - Tom King, Secretary of State for Northern Ireland (1985–1989)
- Secretary of State for Defence
  1. Michael Heseltine, Secretary of State for Defence (1983–1986)
  2. George Younger, Secretary of State for Defence (1986–1989)
- Secretary of State for Trade and Industry
  1. Leon Brittan, Secretary of State for Trade and Industry (1985–1986)
  2. Paul Channon, Secretary of State for Trade and Industry (1986–1987)
- Secretary of State for Education and Science
  1. Sir Keith Joseph, Bt., Secretary of State for Education and Science (1981–1986)
  2. Kenneth Baker, Secretary of State for Education and Science (1986–1989)
- Secretary of State for Wales
  - Nicholas Edwards, Secretary of State for Wales (1979–1987)
- Lord Privy Seal
  - John Biffen, Lord Privy Seal (1983–1987)
- Leader of the House of Commons
  - John Biffen, Leader of the House of Commons (1982–1987)
- Lord President of the Council
  - William Whitelaw, Lord President of the Council (1983–1988)
- Lord Chancellor
  - Quentin Hogg, Lord Chancellor (1979–1987)
- Chancellor of the Duchy of Lancaster
  - Norman Beresford Tebbit, Chancellor of the Duchy of Lancaster (1985–1987)

== Religion ==
- Archbishop of Canterbury
  - Robert Runcie, Archbishop of Canterbury (1980–1991)
- Archbishop of York
  - John Habgood, Archbishop of York (1983–1995)
