= List of 1980 British incumbents =

This is a list of 1980 British incumbents.

== Government ==
- Monarch
  - Head of State – Elizabeth II, Queen of the United Kingdom (1952–2022)
- Prime Minister
  - Head of Government – Margaret Thatcher, Prime Minister of the United Kingdom (1979–1990)
- First Lord of the Treasury
  - Margaret Thatcher, First Lord of the Treasury (1979–1990)
- Chancellor of the Exchequer
  - Sir Geoffrey Howe, Chancellor of the Exchequer (1979–1983)
- Second Lord of the Treasury
  - Sir Geoffrey Howe, Second Lord of the Treasury (1979–1983)
- Secretary of State for Foreign and Commonwealth Affairs
  - Peter Carington, 6th Baron Carrington, Secretary of State for Foreign and Commonwealth Affairs (1979–1982)
- Secretary of State for the Home Department
  - William Whitelaw, Secretary of State for the Home Department (1979–1983)
- Secretary of State for Transport
  - Norman Fowler, Minister for Transport (1979–1981)
- Secretary of State for Scotland
  - George Younger, Secretary of State for Scotland (1979–1986)
- Secretary of State for Social Services
  - Patrick Jenkin, Secretary of State for Social Services (1979–1981)
- Secretary of State for Northern Ireland
  - Humphrey Atkins, Secretary of State for Northern Ireland (1979–1981)
- Secretary of State for Defence
  - Francis Pym, Secretary of State for Defence (1979–1981)
- Secretary of State for Industry
  - Sir Keith Joseph, Bt., Secretary of State for Industry (1979–1981)
- Secretary of State for Trade
  - John Nott, Secretary of State for Trade (1979–1981)
- Secretary of State for Education and Science
  - Mark Carlisle, Secretary of State for Education and Science (1979–1981)
- Secretary of State for Wales
  - Nicholas Edwards, Secretary of State for Wales (1979–1987)
- Lord Privy Seal
  - Sir Ian Gilmour, Lord Privy Seal (1979–1981)
- Leader of the House of Commons
  - Norman St John-Stevas, Leader of the House of Commons (1979–1981)
- Lord President of the Council
  - Christopher Soames, Baron Soames, Lord President of the Council (1979–1981)
- Lord Chancellor
  - Quintin Hogg, Baron Hailsham of St Marylebone, Lord Chancellor (1979–1987)
- Chancellor of the Duchy of Lancaster
  - Norman Arthur Francis St John-Stevas, Chancellor of the Duchy of Lancaster (1979–1981)

== Religion ==
- Archbishop of Canterbury
  1. Donald Coggan, Archbishop of Canterbury (1974–1980; retired 25 January)
  2. Robert Runcie, Archbishop of Canterbury (1980–1991; installed 25 March)
- Archbishop of York
  - Stuart Blanch, Archbishop of York (1975–1983)
