= List of 1978 British incumbents =

This is a list of 1978 British incumbents.

== Government ==
- Monarch
  - Head of State – Elizabeth II, Queen of the United Kingdom (1952–2022)
- Prime Minister
  - Head of Government – James Callaghan, Prime Minister of the United Kingdom (1976–1979)
- First Lord of the Treasury
  - James Callaghan, First Lord of the Treasury (1976–1979)
- Chancellor of the Exchequer
  - Denis Healey, Chancellor of the Exchequer (1974–1979)
- Second Lord of the Treasury
  - Denis Healey, Second Lord of the Treasury (1974–1979)
- Secretary of State for Foreign and Commonwealth Affairs
  - Dr David Owen, Secretary of State for Foreign and Commonwealth Affairs (1977–1979)
- Secretary of State for the Home Department
  - Merlyn Rees, Secretary of State for the Home Department (1976–1979)
- Secretary of State for Transport
  - Bill Rodgers, Secretary of State for Transport (1976–1979)
- Secretary of State for Scotland
  - Bruce Millan, Secretary of State for Scotland (1976–1979)
- Secretary of State for Social Services
  - David Ennals, Secretary of State for Social Services (1976–1979)
- Secretary of State for Northern Ireland
  - Roy Mason, Secretary of State for Northern Ireland (1976–1979)
- Secretary of State for Defence
  - Frederick Mulley, Secretary of State for Defence (1976–1979)
- Secretary of State for Industry
  - Eric Varley, Secretary of State for Industry (1975–1979)
- Secretary of State for Trade
  1. Edmund Dell, Secretary of State for Trade (1976–1978)
  2. John Smith, Secretary of State for Trade (1978–1979)
- Secretary of State for Education and Science
  - Shirley Williams, Secretary of State for Education and Science (1976–1979)
- Secretary of State for Wales
  - John Morris, Secretary of State for Wales (1974–1979)
- Lord Privy Seal
  - Fred Peart, Baron Peart, Lord Privy Seal (1976–1979)
- Leader of the House of Commons
  - Michael Foot, Leader of the House of Commons (1976–1979)
- Lord President of the Council
  - Michael Foot, Lord President of the Council (1976–1979)
- Lord Chancellor
  - Elwyn Jones, Baron Elwyn-Jones, Lord Chancellor (1974–1979)
- Chancellor of the Duchy of Lancaster
  - Harold Lever, Chancellor of the Duchy of Lancaster (1974–1979)

== Religion ==
- Archbishop of Canterbury
  - Donald Coggan, Archbishop of Canterbury (1974–1980)
- Archbishop of York
  - Stuart Blanch, Archbishop of York (1975–1983)
