= List of 1988 British incumbents =

This is a list of 1988 British incumbents.

== Government ==
- Monarch
  - Head of State – Elizabeth II, Queen of the United Kingdom (1952–2022)
- Prime Minister
  - Head of Government – Margaret Thatcher, Prime Minister of the United Kingdom (1979–1990)
- First Lord of the Treasury
  - Margaret Thatcher, First Lord of the Treasury (1979–1990)
- Chancellor of the Exchequer
  - Nigel Lawson, Chancellor of the Exchequer (1983–1989)
- Second Lord of the Treasury
  - Nigel Lawson, Second Lord of the Treasury (1983–1989)
- Secretary of State for Foreign and Commonwealth Affairs
  - Sir Geoffrey Howe, Secretary of State for Foreign and Commonwealth Affairs (1983–1989)
- Secretary of State for the Home Department
  - Douglas Hurd, Secretary of State for the Home Department (1985–1989)
- Secretary of State for Transport
  - Paul Channon, Secretary of State for Transport (1987–1989)
- Secretary of State for Scotland
  - Malcolm Rifkind, Secretary of State for Scotland (1986–1990)
- Secretary of State for Health
  1. John Moore, Secretary of State for Social Services (1987–1988)
  2. Kenneth Clarke, Secretary of State for Health (1988–1990)
- Secretary of State for Northern Ireland
  - Tom King, Secretary of State for Northern Ireland (1985–1989)
- Secretary of State for Defence
  - George Younger, Secretary of State for Defence (1986–1989)
- Secretary of State for Trade and Industry
  - David Young, Secretary of State for Trade and Industry (1987–1989)
- Secretary of State for Education and Science
  - Kenneth Baker, Secretary of State for Education and Science (1986–1989)
- Secretary of State for Wales
  - Peter Walker, Secretary of State for Wales (1987–1990)
- Lord Privy Seal
  1. John Wakeham, Lord Privy Seal (1987–1988)
  2. John Ganzoni, 2nd Baron Belstead, Lord Privy Seal (1988–1990)
- Leader of the House of Commons
  - John Wakeham, Leader of the House of Commons (1987–1989)
- Lord President of the Council
  1. William Whitelaw, 1st Viscount Whitelaw, Lord President of the Council (1983–1988)
  2. John Wakeham, Lord President of the Council (1988–1989)
- Lord Chancellor
  - James Mackay, Baron Mackay of Clashfern, Lord Chancellor (1987–1997)
- Secretary of State for Social Security
  1. see Secretary of State for Social Services (from 1988 Health)
  2. John Moore, Secretary of State for Social Security (1988–1989)
- Chancellor of the Duchy of Lancaster
  1. Kenneth Clarke, Chancellor of the Duchy of Lancaster (1987–1988)
  2. Tony Newton, Chancellor of the Duchy of Lancaster (1988–1989)

== Religion ==
- Archbishop of Canterbury
  - Robert Runcie, Archbishop of Canterbury (1980–1991)
- Archbishop of York
  - John Habgood, Archbishop of York (1983–1995)
