= Janet Young, Baroness Young =

British politician (1926–2002)

The Right Honourable The Baroness Young PC DL

Minister of State for Foreign and Commonwealth Affairs
- In office 13 June 1983 – 13 June 1987
- Prime Minister: Margaret Thatcher
- Preceded by: The Lord Belstead
- Succeeded by: The Lord Glenarthur

Leader of the House of Lords
- In office 14 September 1981 – 11 June 1983
- Prime Minister: Margaret Thatcher
- Preceded by: The Lord Soames
- Succeeded by: The Viscount Whitelaw

Lord Keeper of the Privy Seal
- In office 7 April 1982 – 11 June 1983
- Prime Minister: Margaret Thatcher
- Preceded by: Humphrey Atkins
- Succeeded by: John Biffen

Chancellor of the Duchy of Lancaster
- In office 14 September 1981 – 7 April 1982
- Prime Minister: Margaret Thatcher
- Preceded by: Francis Pym
- Succeeded by: Cecil Parkinson

Minister of State for Education and Science
- In office 7 May 1979 – 14 September 1981
- Prime Minister: Margaret Thatcher
- Preceded by: Gordon Oakes
- Succeeded by: Paul Channon

Parliamentary Under-Secretary of State for Environment
- In office 5 June 1973 – 4 March 1974
- Prime Minister: Edward Heath
- Preceded by: The Lord Sandford
- Succeeded by: Gerald Kaufman

Baroness-in-Waiting Government Whip
- In office 21 April 1972 – 5 June 1973
- Prime Minister: Edward Heath
- Preceded by: New appointment
- Succeeded by: The Lord Strathcona and Mount Royal

Member of the House of Lords
- Lord Temporal
- Life peerage 24 May 1971 – 6 September 2002

Personal details
- Born: 23 October 1926 Widnes, England
- Died: 6 September 2002 (aged 75) Oxford, England
- Party: Conservative
- Education: Yale University; St Anne's College, Oxford

Janet Mary Young, Baroness Young, PC, DL (née Baker, 23 October 1926 – 6 September 2002) was a British Conservative Party politician. She served as the first ever female Leader of the House of Lords from 1981 to 1983, first as Chancellor of the Duchy of Lancaster and from 1982 as Lord Keeper of the Privy Seal. She was the only woman ever appointed to the Cabinet by Margaret Thatcher.

== Early life ==
Born Janet Mary Baker in Widnes in 1926, she was the daughter of J. N. L. Baker, a geographer at Oxford University, and Phyllis (née Hancock) Baker. She went to the mainly boys Dragon School in Oxford where she played rugby and cricket, and then to Headington School. During World War II she studied at Yale University, and then took an MA in philosophy, politics and economics at St Anne's College, Oxford. In 1950, she married the academic chemist Geoffrey Tyndale Young (1915–2014), a Fellow at her father's college Jesus, and had three daughters.

== Political career ==
Young became a councillor for Oxford City Council in 1957 and was leader by 1967. Not long after, she was raised to the peerage on the advice of Edward Heath. Her life peerage was announced on 5 April 1971 and was raised to the peerage on 24 May 1971 as Baroness Young, of Farnworth in the County Palatine of Lancaster. She became a government whip shortly after appointment and was subsequently promoted to minister of state in the Department for Education. She joined the Cabinet on 15 September 1981, when she was appointed to be the Chancellor of the Duchy of Lancaster. On 13 April 1982, she was appointed to be the Leader of the House of Lords and the Lord Keeper of the Privy Seal, posts which she kept for only 14 months, until 11 June 1983. Thatcher thought that Young "was perhaps too consistent an advocate of caution on all occasions" and was not an effective leader in the Lords. However, Young's colleagues disagreed, describing her as "bloody tough" and a "competent minister".

She sat on the boards of large corporations such as NatWest and Marks & Spencer. In later life she was known for her staunch opposition to gay rights; as an obituary put it: "The wellspring of her moral activism was her belief in Christian marriage and family life, her concern for children's welfare and her belief that as a Conservative she should stand up against what she saw as the slide towards an entirely secular society." She worked to try to stop legislation going through that would allow unmarried couples (including gay men and women) to adopt children, led campaigns in the House of Lords to prevent equalisation of the age of consent for homosexual men with that of heterosexuals, and also fought the repeal of Section 28. She was ultimately defeated on all counts. Although she managed to delay the repeal of Section 28 in England and Wales in 2000, after her death Section 28 was finally removed from the statute book in 2003.

== Death ==
Young died from cancer at her home in Oxford on 6 September 2002, at the age of 75.

Following her death, gay rights campaigner Peter Tatchell opined that she had "poisoned society with prejudice and intolerance [...] future historians will rank her alongside the defenders of apartheid. She supported homophobic discrimination to the last."

Political offices
Preceded by Christopher Soames	Leader of the House of Lords; 1981–1983	Succeeded by The Viscount Whitelaw
Preceded by Francis Pym	Chancellor of the Duchy of Lancaster; 1981–1982	Succeeded by Cecil Parkinson
Preceded by Humphrey Atkins	Lord Privy Seal; 1982–1983	Succeeded by John Biffen
Party political offices
Preceded by The Lord Soames	Leader of the Conservative Party in the House of Lords; 1981–1983	Succeeded by The Viscount Whitelaw
