= Arthur Cockfield, Baron Cockfield =

British politician (1916–2007)

The Right Honourable The Lord Cockfield PC
- Cockfield in 1952

European Commissioner for Internal Market and Services
- In office 7 January 1985 – 5 January 1989
- President: Jacques Delors
- Preceded by: Karl-Heinz Narjes
- Succeeded by: Martin Bangemann

Chancellor of the Duchy of Lancaster
- In office 11 June 1983 – 11 September 1984
- Monarch: Elizabeth II
- Prime Minister: Margaret Thatcher
- Preceded by: Cecil Parkinson
- Succeeded by: The Earl of Gowrie

Secretary of State for Trade President of the Board of Trade
- In office 6 April 1982 – 11 June 1983
- Monarch: Elizabeth II
- Prime Minister: Margaret Thatcher
- Preceded by: John Biffen
- Succeeded by: Cecil Parkinson (Trade and Industry)

Minister of State for Treasury
- In office 6 May 1979 – 6 April 1982
- Monarch: Elizabeth II
- Prime Minister: Margaret Thatcher
- Preceded by: Denzil Davies
- Succeeded by: John Wakeham

Member of the House of Lords
- Lord Temporal
- Life peerage 14 April 1978 – 8 January 2007

Personal details
- Born: Francis Arthur Cockfield; 28 September 1916 Horsham, West Sussex, England
- Died: 8 January 2007 (aged 90)
- Party: Conservative
- Education: London School of Economics

Francis Arthur Cockfield, Baron Cockfield PC (/ˈkoʊfiːld/ KOH-feel-d; 28 September 1916 – 8 January 2007), was by turns a civil servant, a company director, a Conservative Party politician, and a European Commissioner. He served as Minister of State at the Treasury from 1979 to 1982, as Secretary of State for Trade from 1982 until 1983, as Chancellor of the Duchy of Lancaster from 1983 until 1984, and a member of the European Commission from 1984 to 1988. He is known as 'The Father of the Single Market'.

== Early life ==
Cockfield was born in Horsham, West Sussex, a month after his father, Lieutenant C. F. Cockfield, died at the Battle of the Somme. He was educated at Dover Grammar School, then read for an LLB and a BSc (Econ) at the London School of Economics.

== Career ==
Cockfield joined the Inland Revenue in 1938, and was called to the bar at the Inner Temple in 1942. He progressed rapidly within the Inland Revenue, serving as Director of Statistics from 1945 to 1952 and as a Commissioner from 1951 to 1952, before joining retailer Boots as its finance director. He was its managing director and chairman from 1961 to 1967. He was also a member of Selwyn Lloyd's National Economic Development Council from 1962 to 1964.

Cockfield was known by his first name, Frank, for most of his life but hated it. When he married his first wife, Ruth Simonis, his granddaughter, Emma, recalls how he told her he wished to use his middle name instead: "All my life I've been called Frank but I've hated it – you're to call me Arthur."

Cockfield left Boots to become an adviser to the Conservative politician Iain Macleod on taxation and economic matters, and was president of the Royal Statistical Society from 1968 to 1969. Macleod died shortly after the Conservatives took power in 1970, but Cockfield went on to advise Anthony Barber, Macleod's successor as Chancellor of the Exchequer, until 1973. He then served as chairman of the Price Commission from 1973 to 1977, receiving a knighthood in 1973 New Years Honours List.

=== Political career ===
Cockfield was created Baron Cockfield, of Dover in the County of Kent on 14 April 1978. On the election of Margaret Thatcher to office in May 1979, he became a Minister of State at the Treasury, a post he held until April 1982. He became a member of the Privy Council in 1982, and was the last Secretary of State for Trade from 1982, before it was merged with the Department of Industry in 1983.

After the 1983 general election, Cockfield became Chancellor of the Duchy of Lancaster. In this role he had no specific departmental responsibilities, so he effectively became an adviser to the Prime Minister. Lord Cockfield resigned from the cabinet in September 1984 to join the European Commission as commissioner for Internal Market, Tax Law and Customs under Jacques Delors, and a vice-president of the first Delors Commission. He was expected to follow Thatcher's Eurosceptic line, but became a driving force in laying the groundwork for the creation of the European single market in 1992. Only a few months after he arrived in Brussels, he produced a lengthy white paper listing 300 barriers to trade, with a timetable for them to be abolished. He was not selected to serve a second term, and was replaced by Leon Brittan.

=== Later career ===
After leaving the Commission in 1988, Cockfield became a consultant for accountants Peat, Marwick, McLintock. He was awarded the Grand Cross of the Order of Leopold II of Belgium in 1990, and honorary doctorates and fellowships from a number of British and American universities.

== Personal life ==
He married twice. He married his first wife, Ruth Helen Simonis, in 1943, but they divorced in the early 1960s. They had a daughter and a son. He later married choreographer Monica Mudie, in 1970; she died in 1992.

Lord Cockfield is buried, along with his wife Monica, on the Isle of Man.

== Arms ==
Coat of arms of Arthur Cockfield, Baron Cockfield
Crest A globe rising Or issuing therefrom a lymphad sail furled Azure flying from the main and stern masts flags Gules therein two human figures that in the stern pulling an oar Or. Escutcheon Chequy Azure and Gules two flaunches conjoined to three barrulets Or. Supporters On either side a cock Azure combed wattled beaked and legged Gules gorged with a mural crown Or. Motto Prorsum Specta Nec Rursum Badge A Square Billet embattled chequy Azure and Or.

Political offices
Preceded by John Biffen	Secretary of State for Trade; 1982–1983	Succeeded by Cecil Parkinson as Secretary of State for Trade and Industry
Preceded by Cecil Parkinson	Chancellor of the Duchy of Lancaster; 1983–1984	Succeeded by The Earl of Gowrie
Preceded by Christopher Tugendhat	European Commissioner from the United Kingdom; 1985–1989; Served alongside: Stanley Clinton-Davis	Succeeded by Leon Brittan
Preceded by Ivor Richard	European Commissioner from the United Kingdom; 1985–1989; Served alongside: Stanley Clinton-Davis	Succeeded by Bruce Millan
Preceded by Karl-Heinz Narjes	European Commissioner for Internal Market and Services; 1985–1989	Succeeded by Martin Bangemann
