= John Moore, Baron Moore of Lower Marsh =

British politician (1937–2019)

The Right Honourable The Lord Moore of Lower Marsh PC
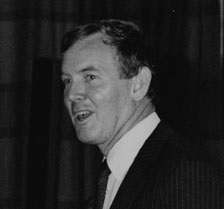
- Moore in 1985

Secretary of State for Social Security
- In office 25 July 1988 – 23 July 1989
- Prime Minister: Margaret Thatcher
- Preceded by: Himself (Social Services)
- Succeeded by: Tony Newton

Secretary of State for Social Services
- In office 13 June 1987 – 25 July 1988
- Prime Minister: Margaret Thatcher
- Preceded by: Norman Fowler
- Succeeded by: Himself (Social Security); Kenneth Clarke (Health)

Secretary of State for Transport
- In office 21 May 1986 – 13 June 1987
- Prime Minister: Margaret Thatcher
- Preceded by: Nicholas Ridley
- Succeeded by: Paul Channon

Financial Secretary to the Treasury
- In office 19 October 1983 – 21 May 1986
- Prime Minister: Margaret Thatcher
- Preceded by: Nicholas Ridley
- Succeeded by: Norman Lamont

Economic Secretary to the Treasury
- In office 13 June 1983 – 19 October 1983
- Prime Minister: Margaret Thatcher
- Preceded by: Jock Bruce-Gardyne
- Succeeded by: Ian Stewart

Member of the House of Lords
- Lord Temporal
- Life peerage 3 July 1992 – 20 May 2019

Member of Parliament for Croydon Central
- In office 28 February 1974 – 16 March 1992
- Preceded by: Constituency created
- Succeeded by: Paul Beresford

Personal details
- Born: John Edward Michael Moore; 26 November 1937 London, England
- Died: 20 May 2019 (aged 81) London, England
- Party: Conservative
- Spouse: Sheila Tillotson (m. 1962; died 2008)
- Children: 3
- Education: London School of Economics
- Profession: Stockbroker

John Edward Michael Moore, Baron Moore of Lower Marsh (26 November 1937 – 20 May 2019) was a British Conservative Party politician who was Member of Parliament for Croydon Central from February 1974 until 1992. During the Premiership of Margaret Thatcher he enjoyed a meteoric rise through the ranks of government, which culminated in his serving as a Secretary of State in the Cabinet from 1987 to 1989. For a time, he was considered a rising star of his party and a potential leadership contender.

Moore was particularly noted for his "filmstar good looks" and an American background: Moore's wife was American and he had lived for several years in the US. He brought aspects of American corporate culture to government and was reported to speak with a slight American accent. His first political experience was as a Democratic Party organiser in Illinois during the early 1960s.

Moore's fortunes in government waned after 1987 when he was made responsible for the highly sensitive portfolios of health and social security. His earlier success had been as a facilitator of the Thatcher government's privatisation programme. In this capacity he became known as "Mr Privatisation". When Moore attempted to extend this concept into the management of the National Health Service and the wider provision of social services, he encountered opposition from all sides. After losing credibility he was effectively demoted in 1988 (through loss of the health portfolio) and then sacked from his cabinet post in 1989.

Moore left the House of Commons in 1992, subsequently holding a number of corporate directorships and chairmanships.

== Early life ==
Moore was born in Kentish Town, London, in 1937. His father was a factory worker who later became a publican. He attended the Licensed Victuallers' School in Slough, an independent school supported by his father's trade body. After leaving school, Moore undertook two years of National Service from 1955 to 1957. He served with the Royal Sussex Regiment in Korea and won a temporary commission.

He enrolled at the London School of Economics in 1958, and followed a three-year degree course. He was active in student politics, and held the position of President of the LSE Students' Union. During this time he met fellow student Sheila Tillotson. Moore accompanied Tillotson back to her native Chicago after the two had both completed their studies. Here the couple married in 1962 and Moore found work initially as a financial analyst with a Chicago investment bank. He became a stockbroker, and achieved a senior position at the Chicago office of the Dean Witter brokerage. Dean Witter catered to a mainly middle-class clientele, with the typical client holding only a modest portfolio of stock.

While in Chicago, Moore became a Democratic Party activist, motivated by his opposition to segregation, and served as a "precinct captain". In this capacity he gained experience of American political campaigning which he later applied in the UK. He was reportedly much impressed by President John F. Kennedy, and adopted him as a role model.

Moore returned to the UK in 1968, and took up an appointment in London as Chairman of Dean Witter (International). The Moores set up residence in the suburb of Wimbledon where their three children (one daughter and two sons) were born. Moore became active in local Conservative politics and was elected to serve as a Councillor in the London Borough of Merton in 1971. He initially gave the impression of being a liberal conservative. For example, he opposed the withdrawal of free school milk from the Borough's children which was happening as the result of the government budget cuts policy.

In October 1973, he was adopted as the prospective Conservative parliamentary candidate for the Croydon Central constituency. At this time he was described as being "an investment banker and stockbroker".

== Early political career ==
Croydon Central was a new constituency, and was initially very marginally Conservative. Moore won the seat in the February 1974 general election by a majority of 1,300 votes over Labour. His majority was reduced to 164 in the October 1974 election. However, he was able to strengthen his position in the constituency; the last time he contested the seat (in the 1987 election) he achieved a majority of over 10,000. His wife, Sheila, acted as his constituency secretary, speech writer and political adviser. She combined her duties in this regard with studying for a law degree and acting as a local magistrate. Observers commented that Sheila was very much the driving force behind his rise in politics.

Moore projected the image of a young, vigorous politician. He would usually rise at 05:30 and be at his desk by 07:00. He was a member of the House of Commons football team and the House skiing team. It is reported that his wife "... kept him on a strict regime of camomile tea, decaffeinated coffee and health food...." He was frequently seen jogging in the early morning in the Westminster area, and was reported to spend 30 minutes each day on an exercise bicycle. In 1987, Conservative MP Julian Critchley described him as "Handsome, with the sort of looks that would have appealed to J. Arthur Rank, personable and polite" and looking "ten years younger than his 49 years".

Margaret Thatcher appointed Moore as one of five Conservative Party vice-chairmen in March 1975, shortly after she became Conservative leader. Moore's remit was "youth". He held this position until the Conservatives were returned to office in 1979, at which time he was appointed as Parliamentary Under-Secretary of State for Energy. In this capacity, one of his main duties was responsibility for the nationalised British coal industry.

Following the 1983 general election, Moore was appointed Economic Secretary to the Treasury under Chancellor Nigel Lawson. At the Treasury, Moore was charged with fronting government policy on privatisation. Most notably, he oversaw the privatisation of British Telecom in 1984 and that of several other major utilities supplying gas, electricity and water. The privatisation of state-owned industries was a major feature of the Thatcher governments. These privatisations were popularised by small parcels of shares in the privatised entities being made available to members of the public at deeply discounted prices. This promoted a form of popular capitalism along the lines of the Dean Witter business model. Moore gained an extremely high profile and became known as "Mr Privatisation".

== Cabinet career ==
Moore joined Thatcher's Cabinet in 1986 as Secretary of State for Transport. His tenure of office at Transport was brief but coincided with the completion of major developments such as the M25 London orbital motorway and the privatisation of British Airways. The capsizing of the Herald of Free Enterprise car ferry outside Zeebrugge harbour on 6 March 1987 gave Moore considerable media exposure. These events served to raise Moore's profile even further and he played a prominent campaign role in the 1987 general election.

... what probably clinched his promotion to the DHSS yesterday was his TV performance in the party political broadcast that attacked the loony left. It was Thatcher herself who suggested that Moore be used on it. The broadcast was, according to one observer, considered "sharp, nasty – and effective".

By now, Moore was being widely spoken of as a future Prime Minister, with journalist Brian Walden saying in 1987 that "he has future Tory leader written all over him". After the 1987 election he was appointed as Secretary of State for Social Services. In this capacity he was responsible for the National Health Service's £66 billion annual spend, and the payment of over £50 billion annually in the form of social security benefits. These were highly sensitive portfolios that were intended to be very much at the centre of policy initiatives in the 1987 government.

However, there were some early misgivings about the appointment. Describing Moore's earlier career in government, Julian Critchley said, "The script had been written for him, and he had only to learn his lines". Other commentators noted that his previous experience had been in implementing policy rather than in creating policy. In 2012 David Waddington, Mrs Thatcher's former Chief Whip and Home Secretary published a memoir of his time in government ('Dispatches') in which he reported that Thatcher had a weakness for "a good-looking fellow" when it came to making government appointments. "Once or twice she ... wished to have some good-looking fellow promoted who was known to be useless. ... He was a fine-looking chap but nobody else thought he was anything like up to the job." Waddington declined to name the people he referred to but many commentators stated that Moore was one clear beneficiary of this personal foible.

Once established in his new job, Moore delivered a series of speeches on policy in the social services. These speeches appeared to indicate a move to a healthcare system based on private insurance, similar to the American model. Specific proposals included making private healthcare insurance contributions tax-deductible, and allowing nurses' wage rates to be established by local bargaining rather than by central negotiation. Moore quickly encountered opposition from various interest groups, including the Royal College of Physicians. Many Conservative backbench MPs had misgivings about what was being proposed. Furthermore, some of the speeches suggested that Moore was positioning himself to be leader of the Conservative Party. During a visit to the US in October 1987, he delivered a speech to the Mont Pelerin Society in which he appeared to suggest that he had been the prime mover behind privatisation in the UK. This displeased his fellow Ministers and other senior Party figures.

Moore did not seem to engage comfortably in the public estimate procedures by which departmental spending budgets were set. The then Chief Secretary to the Treasury, John Major, was reported to have found Moore to be "a soft touch". The then Health Minister, Edwina Currie, is reported to have described Moore as being "useless". An entry in her diary dated January 1988 reads: "It became apparent during the first ten days ... that Moore just didn't know what to do". Moore found difficulties in his relationships with senior civil servants. Not all the latter were comfortable with a working day that started at 07:00. Moore's wife (and political adviser), Sheila, had clashes with civil servants, and Moore was privately warned that she did not understand the British way of doing things. It is believed that Sheila may have drafted some of Moore's more controversial speeches.

A 1987 Cabinet Office memo written by Moore stated that the Government had adopted a Policy of not accepting any direct responsibility for the Contaminated Blood Scandal. It was unearthed and made public in 2017 with many of those affected by the scandal alleging a cover-up.

In November 1987, Moore was struck down with bacterial pneumonia. He initially ignored the illness and tried to attend a cabinet meeting, during which he lost consciousness, and was subsequently admitted to Parkside Hospital in Wimbledon. The fact that this was a private clinic owned by a German healthcare company (reportedly charging patients up to £2,000 per day) attracted bad publicity. Union leader Rodney Bickerstaffe stated "How can a social services secretary claim to care about the National Health Service when he does not even trust his own health care to an NHS hospital?".

== End of political career ==
After two months' absence due to illness, Moore returned to work but by now his political prospects were much diminished. The Department of Health and Social Security was split into two separate ministries, with Kenneth Clarke becoming Secretary of State for Health on 25 July 1988. Moore remained in the Cabinet as Secretary of State for Social Security for a further year. However, his credibility was further damaged by speeches in which he appeared to suggest that poverty had been abolished in modern Britain. His attempt to target state assistance towards poorer families while freezing child benefits provoked a major rebellion by Conservative backbench MPs.

Moore was sacked from the cabinet in July 1989. Most commentators at the time considered him to have been a weak politician who had been promoted beyond his ability. One colleague compared him to 'a frightened rabbit mesmerised by oncoming headlights'.

Between his sacking from the Cabinet in 1989 and stepping down from the House of Commons in 1992 his only contributions were in two transport debates. He gave up his parliamentary seat at the time of the 1992 general election. After leaving government Moore held a number of directorships with large concerns, including Credit Suisse Asset Management and Rolls-Royce. In 2010 he retired as Chairman of the Monitor Group.

After leaving the Commons, Moore became a life peer as Baron Moore of Lower Marsh, of Lower Marsh in the London Borough of Lambeth. His attendance was very sparse; a BBC feature in August 2011 reported that after 20 years in the House of Lords, Moore had still to make his maiden speech.

== Personal life ==
Moore and his wife, the former Sheila Tillotson, had three children and were married until her death in 2008. Moore had a longstanding interest in exercise and fitness. During his time as an MP, he played football and took up skiing; later in life, he competed in a triathlon when he was 64, which he completed despite a fall off his bike at one point, and also became an avid practitioner of tai chi. He died from complications of pneumonia and a stroke at St George's Hospital in London on 20 May 2019, aged 81.

== Arms ==
Coat of arms of John Moore, Baron Moore of Lower Marsh
Crest A Griffin segreant erect Azure billety Or and bezanty Beak Forelegs and Wings also Or holding in the dexter foreclaw a Double Warded Key wards upwards Gold Escutcheon Azure a Dolphin naiant Argent between three Bunches of Grapes stalked and leaved Gold Supporters On either side a Griffin statant erect Azure that to the dexter bezanty that to the sinister billety Or the Beak Forelegs and Wings of each also Or, the whole upon a Compartment comprising two Grassy Mounts with Marshland between them all proper Motto Live free or die

Parliament of the United Kingdom
New constituency	Member of Parliament for Croydon Central; 1974–1992	Succeeded by Paul Beresford
Political offices
Preceded by Jock Bruce-Gardyne	Economic Secretary to the Treasury; 1983	Succeeded by Ian Stewart
Preceded by Nicholas Ridley	Financial Secretary to the Treasury; 1983–1986	Succeeded by Norman Lamont
Preceded by Nicholas Ridley	Secretary of State for Transport; 1986–1987	Succeeded by Paul Channon
Preceded by Norman Fowler	Secretary of State for Social Services; 1987–1988	Succeeded by Himself as Secretary of State for Social Security
Preceded by Norman Fowler	Secretary of State for Social Services; 1987–1988	Succeeded by Kenneth Clarke as Secretary of State for Health
Preceded by Himself as Secretary of State for Social Services	Secretary of State for Social Security; 1988–1989	Succeeded by Tony Newton
