= Patrick Jenkin =

British politician (1926–2016)

The Right Honourable The Lord Jenkin of Roding PC
- Jenkin in 1966

Secretary of State for the Environment
- In office 12 June 1983 – 2 September 1985
- Prime Minister: Margaret Thatcher
- Preceded by: Tom King
- Succeeded by: Kenneth Baker

Secretary of State for Industry
- In office 14 September 1981 – 12 June 1983
- Prime Minister: Margaret Thatcher
- Preceded by: Keith Joseph
- Succeeded by: Cecil Parkinson^{[nb]}

Secretary of State for Social Services
- In office 4 May 1979 – 14 September 1981
- Prime Minister: Margaret Thatcher
- Preceded by: David Ennals
- Succeeded by: Norman Fowler

Chief Secretary to the Treasury
- In office 7 April 1972 – 8 January 1974
- Prime Minister: Edward Heath
- Chancellor: Anthony Barber
- Preceded by: Maurice Macmillan
- Succeeded by: Tom Boardman

Financial Secretary to the Treasury
- In office 19 June 1970 – 7 April 1972
- Prime Minister: Edward Heath
- Preceded by: Dick Taverne
- Succeeded by: Terence Higgins

Member of Parliament for Wanstead and Woodford
- In office 15 October 1964 – 18 May 1987
- Preceded by: Constituency established
- Succeeded by: James Arbuthnot
Shadow cabinet positions
Shadow Secretary of State for Health and Social Services
In office 19 November 1976 – 4 May 1979
Leader	Margaret Thatcher
Preceded by	Norman Fowler
Succeeded by	Stan Orme
Shadow Secretary of State for Energy
In office 18 February 1975 – 19 November 1976
Leader	Margaret Thatcher
Succeeded by	John Biffen

Member of the House of Lords
- Lord Temporal
- Life peerage 3 November 1987 – 6 January 2015

Personal details
- Born: Charles Patrick Fleeming Jenkin; 7 September 1926 Edinburgh, Scotland
- Died: 20 December 2016 (aged 90) Bury St Edmunds, Suffolk, England
- Party: Conservative
- Spouse: Monica Graham (m. 1950, d. 2022)
- Children: 4, including Bernard
- Education: Jesus College, Cambridge; Middle Temple, Inns of Court
- n.b. As Sec. of State for Trade and Industry.

Charles Patrick Fleeming Jenkin, Baron Jenkin of Roding, PC (7 September 1926 – 20 December 2016) was a British Conservative Party politician who served as a cabinet minister in Margaret Thatcher's first government.

== Life and career ==
Jenkin was born in September 1926 and educated at the Dragon School in Oxford, Clifton College in Bristol and Jesus College, Cambridge. He became a barrister, called to the bar by the Middle Temple in 1952, and company director. He was a councillor on Hornsey Borough Council from 1960 to 1963.

The following year, Jenkin became the Conservative Member of Parliament for Wanstead and Woodford. From 1965, he served as an Opposition spokesman on economic and trade affairs. He was a member of the Bow Group from 1951. In January 1974, he became Minister for Energy just weeks before the Conservatives fell from office and participated in many ways in the government of Margaret Thatcher. He served as Secretary of State for Social Services from 1979 to 1981, then as Secretary of State for Industry until 1983, and finally as Secretary of State for the Environment from 1983 to 1985.

Jenkin retired from the Commons at the 1987 general election. He was elevated to the House of Lords as a life peer with the title Baron Jenkin of Roding, of Wanstead and Woodford in Greater London. Whilst in the Lords, Jenkin was interviewed in 2012 as part of The History of Parliament's oral history project. He was noted for his contribution to the debate during the passage of the Marriage (Same Sex Couples) Act 2013. On 6 January 2015, he retired from the House of Lords pursuant to section 1 of the House of Lords Reform Act 2014. He died on 20 December 2016, aged 90.

Jenkin was president of the Foundation for Science and Technology, and a vice-president of the Local Government Association.

== Family and personal life ==
Jenkin's grandfather Frewen was the first Professor of Engineering Science at the University of Oxford from 1908 in the newly created Department of Engineering Science, and the namesake of the Jenkin Building at Oxford. Jenkin's great-grandfather was the engineer Fleeming Jenkin.

In 1954, he married (Alison) Monica Graham (1928–2022). They had two sons and two daughters. Their younger son, Bernard, is the Conservative Member of Parliament for Harwich and North Essex.

== Arms ==
Coat of arms of Patrick Jenkin
Coronet Coronet of a baron Crest On a Mural Crown per pale Argent and Sable a Lion rampant reguardant Sable armed and langued Gules Escutcheon Argent a Lion rampant reguardant Sable armed and langued Gules within a Bordure also Sable Supporters Dexter: a Seal erect on a Rock; Sinister: a Stag erect on a Grassy Mount, all proper Motto Toujours Fidele (Always faithful)

Parliament of the United Kingdom
New constituency	Member of Parliament for Wanstead and Woodford; 1964–1987	Succeeded by James Arbuthnot
Political offices
Preceded by Dick Taverne	Financial Secretary to the Treasury; 1970–1972	Succeeded by Terence Higgins
Preceded by Maurice Macmillan	Chief Secretary to the Treasury; 1972–1974	Succeeded by Tom Boardman
Preceded by David Ennals	Secretary of State for Social Services; 1979–1981	Succeeded by Norman Fowler
Preceded by Keith Joseph	Secretary of State for Industry; 1981–1983	Succeeded by Cecil Parkinson as Secretary of State for Trade and Industry
Preceded by Tom King	Secretary of State for the Environment; 1983–1985	Succeeded by Kenneth Baker
