= Donald Coggan =

Archbishop of Canterbury from 1974 to 1980

The Right Reverend and Right Honourable The Lord Coggan PC
- Archbishop of Canterbury
- Coggan in 1962
- Church: Church of England
- Diocese: Canterbury
- In office: 1974–1980
- Predecessor: Michael Ramsey
- Successor: Robert Runcie
- Other post: Primate of All England
- Previous posts: Bishop of Bradford (1956–1961); Archbishop of York (1961–1974)

Orders
- Ordination: 1935 by Arthur Winnington-Ingram
- Consecration: 25 January 1956 by Michael Ramsey

Personal details
- Born: 9 October 1909 Highgate, Middlesex, England
- Died: 17 May 2000 (aged 90) Otterbourne, Hampshire, England
- Buried: Canterbury Cathedral
- Denomination: Anglican
- Parents: Cornish Arthur Coggan & Fanny Sarah Chubb
- Spouse: Jean Braithwaite (1909–2005)
- Children: 2

Member of the House of Lords
- Lord Temporal
- Life peerage 28 January 1980 – 17 May 2000
- Lord Spiritual
- In office 8 November 1961 – 25 January 1980

Frederick Donald Coggan, Baron Coggan, PC (9 October 1909 – 17 May 2000) was the 101st Archbishop of Canterbury from 1974 to 1980. As Archbishop of Canterbury, he "revived morale within the Church of England, opened a dialogue with Rome and supported women's ordination". He had previously been successively the Bishop of Bradford and the Archbishop of York.

== Childhood and education ==
Donald Coggan (he dropped the name Frederick) was born on 9 October 1909 at 32 Croftdown Road, Highgate, Middlesex, the youngest child of Cornish Arthur Coggan, at one time national president of the Federation of Meat Traders and mayor of St Pancras, London, and his wife, Fanny Sarah Chubb.

Cornish Arthur Coggan "seems to have taken little interest in his family". Therefore, their three children were raised by their mother. During the First World War she took them to Burnham-on-Sea, in Somerset, for safety. It was there that young Donald was influenced by Ashley King, an evangelist who conducted missions for children on the beach. After the war ended, the family returned to London, but "the strains and stresses of the family’s life were so great that Donald became physically ill." This illness rendered him unable to attend school. Therefore, Donald was taught by a neighbour for four years. The neighbour helped Donald "develop what was to become a life-long love of music."

=== Early education ===
At the age of 14, Coggan was well enough to enter Merchant Taylors' School, Northwood. After his confirmation in 1924, he felt drawn to ordination. "His sisters had encouraged him by introducing him to an evangelical church, and these early influences never left him." At school Coggan studied Latin, Greek and Hebrew seriously.

=== Cambridge ===
Having shown an unusual aptitude for languages, Coggan was awarded an open exhibition to St John's College, Cambridge. He entered St John's College in 1928 with an open exhibition, but he was so studious that it was later upgraded to a full scholarship. He was outstanding in oriental languages, Hebrew, Aramaic, and Syriac, and won a first in both parts of the Tripos examinations in 1930 and 1931. He won the Tyrwhitt Hebrew Scholarship, the Mason Hebrew Prize, and the Jeremie Septuagint Prize.

During his time in Cambridge, Coggan helped found a branch of the Christian Union, an evangelical student movement. He also joined the Cambridge Inter-Collegiate Christian Union, serving as treasurer and vice-president. He became a member of the executive committee of the Inter-Varsity Fellowship.

Coggan "graduated with an impressive double first". He received a Bachelor of Arts degree in 1931 and a Master of Arts degree in 1932.

On graduating from Cambridge in 1931, Coggan decided to postpone preparation for ordination for three years. During that time he was an assistant lecturer in Semitic languages and Literature at the University of Manchester. There, he served on the board of management of the Manchester City Mission, and also edited the Inter-Varsity Fellowship magazine.

=== Oxford ===
In 1934, Coggan went to Wycliffe Hall, Oxford, to prepare for ordination. The next year he married Jean Strain. She was the daughter of a London surgeon and a member of the administrative staff of the Inter-Varsity Fellowship. The couple lived in modest circumstances. They both shared in pastoral and evangelistic work in the parish.

The couple later had two children: (Dorothy) Ann Coggan (1938–2004) and Ruth Evelyn Coggan (born 1940).

== Curate and professor ==
As a youth, his mother took Coggan to an evangelical parish church in Upper Holloway. He remained "within the evangelical tradition" the rest of his life.

Coggan served as a curate in the evangelical St Mary's Church, Islington, from 1934 to 1937. He was ordained a priest in 1935.

=== Canada ===
From 1937 to 1944, Coggan served as Professor of New Testament studies and Dean of Residence at Wycliffe College in Toronto. During those years, he helped "restore the reputation of the college after a period of serious decline". Coggan spoke and preached in many places.

While in Canada, Coggan developed an interest in the theology and teaching of preaching and set up "schools of preaching". During that time, although an evangelical, meaning "a love of the Bible and a missionary dynamic", he dropped his "more fundamentalist attitudes".

Jean Coggan accompanied her husband to Canada. During their "happy years in Canada", Jean give birth to two daughters, Ann in 1938 and Ruth in 1940.

Wycliffe College awarded Coggan a Bachelor of Divinity degree in 1941, and an honorary Doctorate of Divinity in 1944.

== College principal (1944–1956) ==
Coggan returned to England in 1944 as principal of the London College of Divinity until he became a bishop in 1956. He was invited to be a vice-president of the Inter-Varsity Fellowship. But, in spite of his previous work in the organisation, he declined because he could no longer state a belief in the Bible as "infallible". In addition to serving as principal, Coggan served as Macneil Professor of Biblical Exegesis from 1952 until he left.

When Coggan became principal, the college buildings at Highbury had been bombed by the Germans, and there were only a few students in residence. A new building was planned at Northwood, London. In the meantime, Coggan had to restore the college by using a manor house in Sussex. He recruited a gifted staff and imposed a strict regimen. Under Coggan's leadership, the college "became one of the Church of England's most highly regarded theological colleges".

In addition to serving as principal and professor, Coggan served as a proctor in the Convocation (the fore-runner of the General Synod) for the Diocese of London from 1950 to 1956, as an examining chaplain in the Diocese of Lincoln from 1946 to 1956, the Diocese of Manchester from 1951 to 1956, the Diocese of Southwark from 1954 to 1956 the Diocese of Chester from 1955 to 1956.

When Coggan returned to England, wartime constraints on travel meant that his wife and their two children had to remain in Toronto temporarily. When the family returned, the situation was "appalling". Coggan was "permanently on duty" during the college's reconstruction, and the family's living conditions were inadequate. Jean "fell ill" as a result of this stress.

Coggan was awarded a Lambeth degree of Doctor of Divinity (D.D.) in 1957.

He served as a member of the Board of Governors of Monkton Combe School for nearly fifty years, from 1945 to 1994.

== Bishop of Bradford (1956–1961) ==
Coggan was in great demand as a preacher and lecturer in all parts of the country. Therefore, "it was no surprise when in 1956 the Prime Minister, Anthony Eden, nominated him for the bishopric of the Diocese of Bradford." The previous bishop, Alfred Blunt, had triggered the King Edward VIII abdication crisis in 1936. From 1931 onwards, Blunt had suffered nervous illnesses, and in 1955 he was forced to retire after a stroke. Therefore, when Coggan became bishop "the life of the diocese was at a low ebb".

"Coggan swept in with great energy and firm discipline, and in the space of five years organised the building of five new churches and new diocesan offices, the opening of Scargill House - a fine conference and retreat centre at Scargill, and the raising of much money. Parishes were visited, standards were raised, and the new bishop became a popular figure."

Coggan's success as Bishop of Bradford, as it had been in Canada and at the London College of Divinity, demonstrated that he was "thoroughly capable and balanced, colossally hardworking, a scholarly teacher, a fine preacher, and an increasingly irenic personality."

Coggan was given a Doctor of Divinity (honorary) by the University of Leeds in 1958.

While Coggan served as Bishop of Bradford, he became a world vice-president of the United Bible Societies in 1957. He also served as Select Preacher for Oxford University from 1960 to 1961, as Chairman of the Liturgical Commission from 1960 to 1964, and Chairman of the College of Preachers from 1960 to 1980.

== Archbishop of York (1961–1974) ==
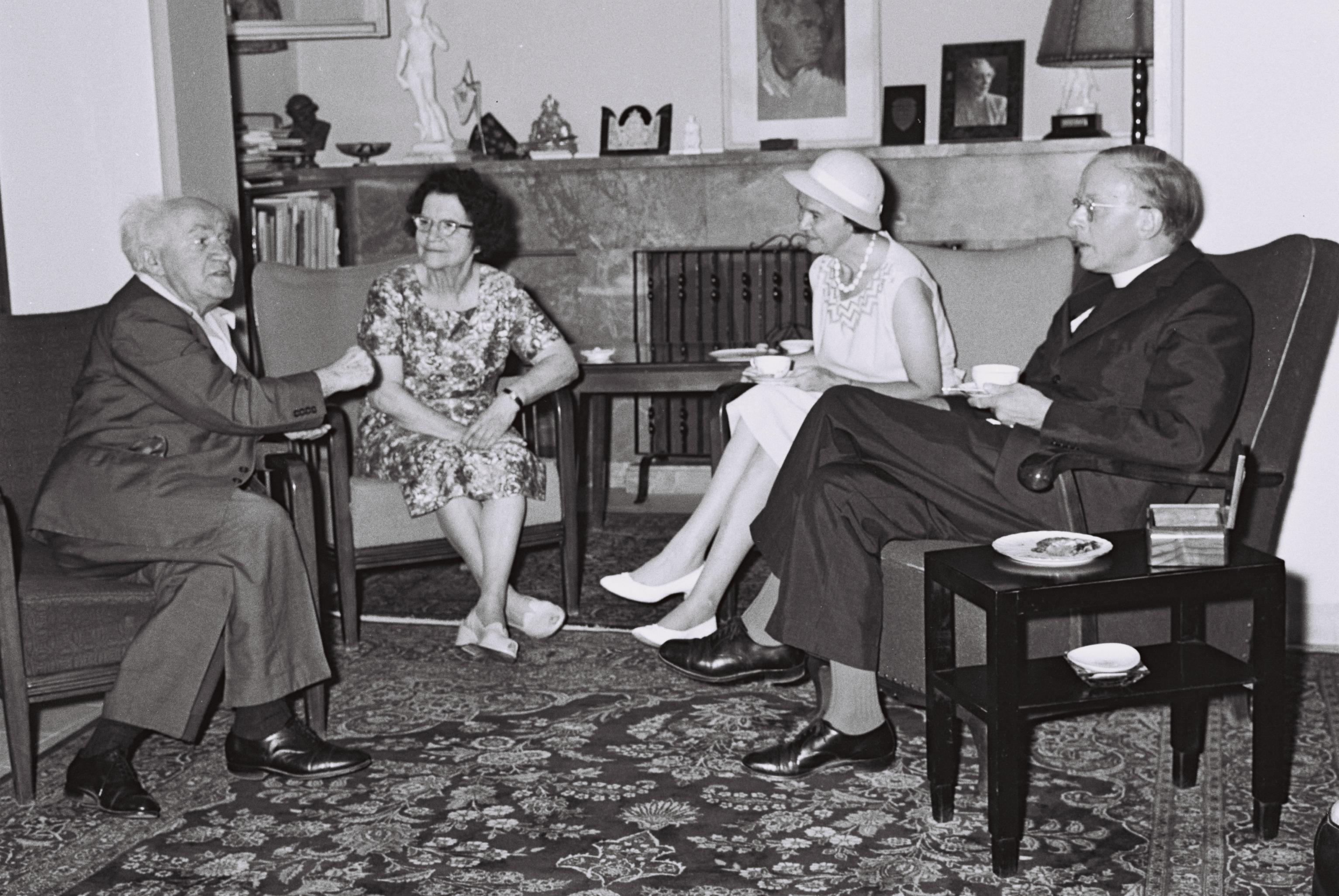
Ben-Gurion and Coggan flanking their wives, 1961

Coggan was appointed Archbishop of York in 1961. Before his enthronement, he visited Israel and met with Prime Minister David Ben-Gurion.

Coggan was enthroned on 13 September 1961. "At his 1961 enthronement in York Minster, Coggan’s evangelical friends were surprised that he wore a cope and mitre.

Coggan began his new ministry with the zeal he had shown in Canada and as Principal of the London College of Divinity. However, "his zeal sometimes outstripped his wisdom, and amid a plethora of activity in the diocese, involving the setting up of numerous councils and committees". After starting something new, Coggan "tended to become preoccupied with yet another initiative, or to find himself required overseas".

=== Overseas ===
Coggan visited four continents while at York. He played a leading role in the Anglican Congress in Toronto in 1963.

In 1967, Coggan took a tour to Australia and New Zealand on behalf of the United Bible Societies. He "filled public halls and cathedrals with his lectures on the place of the Bible in modern society". He also visited the British armed forces bases in Singapore and Borneo, meeting with senior officers, leading retreats, and teaching schools for service chaplains.

In 1970, Coggan led a Canadian Congress on Evangelism. In 1971, he went to Belgium to meet Cardinal Suenens.

=== At home ===
At home, Coggan was chairman of the Church of England's recently formed Liturgical Commission. He also served as Pro-Chancellor of the University of York from 1962 to 1974, as Pro-Chancellor of Hull University from 1968 to 1974, as President of the Society for Old Testament Study from 1967, as a member of the Privy Council of the United Kingdom from 1961 until his retirement in 1980 by virtue of his office, as the Shaftesbury Lecturer in 1973, and as Prelate of the Order of St John of Jerusalem (1967–91).

He played a leading role in the Lambeth Conference of 1968.

The then Archbishop of Canterbury, Geoffrey Fisher, once said that Coggan was "like a man with a wheelbarrow; however much you pile on him, he goes on pushing".

Coggan's concern "with Scripture translations, exegesis and preaching dominated his mind" His "interest in Biblical translation persisted in his ministry – he was actively involved in the preparation of new, clear and usable translations of biblical texts, including the New English Bible (1961) and the Revised English Bible (published in 1989)". He was chairman of the Joint Committee responsible for the translation of the New English Bible (1970). and chairman of the Joint Committee responsible for the translation of the Revised English Bible (1989).

Coggan was "in great demand as a preacher and lecturer in all parts of the country". Not only was Coggan in demand as a preacher and lecturer, his wife Jean was also. As a lay reader at York, she conducted services and preached. In addition, she was "a popular speaker, and much in demand".

Coggan was awarded a Doctor of Divinity by Cambridge University in 1962 and a Doctor of Divinity by the University of Hull in 1963.

=== Established new programmes ===
Coggan began Opportunity Unlimited. The programme served to encourage the parishes in prayer, teaching, and visiting. There were "the three planks on which Coggan believed the parochial ministry to be based".

Coggan "founded, and energetically promoted, Feed the Minds, an ecumenical programme for providing Christian literature to the third world". He also founded the English College of Preachers, based on a similar organization in the USA.

In these ventures, Coggan found assistants of real caliber. John Hunter, Alec Gilmore, and Douglas Cleverley Ford. David Blunt, Coggan's lay chaplain, the son of his predecessor in the Diocese of Bradford, was a key person in all of Coggan's activities.

Coggan's appointments of three suffragan bishops were also highly successful: George Snow, Douglas Sargent, and Hubert Higgs "all provided thoughtful loyalty and stimulating companionship". The theologian Alan Richardson, who was dean of York Minster, became a close friend and confidant.

In the early 1960s, Coggan expressed his support for the ordination of women. He formally proposed it at the Lambeth Conference in 1968". Coggan also "pressed repeatedly" for inter-communion with the Roman Catholic Church

In 1967, Coggan was awarded a Doctor of Letters by the Westminster Choir College and a Doctor of Sacred Theology by the General Theological Seminary. While in North America, Coggan addressed The Empire Club of Canada in Toronto on 1 June 1967. His speech was titled “The East, The West and the Bible”.

In 1972, Coggan demonstrated his abhorrence to racial intolerance by opening the Bishop's Palace in York to an Asian family that had been forced to leave Uganda. He opposed apartheid in South African and was a sponsor of a "No Arms for South Africa" campaign along."

The University of Manchester awarded Coggan a Doctor of Divinity degree in 1972.

Regarding homosexuality, in 1973 Coggan said on BBC radio that many Anglican clergymen were homosexuals. "We must treat them," he proclaimed, "with great sympathy and understanding."

Coggan was "often described as the laymen's archbishop. He made friends easily with business leaders and workers alike. He was perhaps less at ease with the landed gentry of the Yorkshire farms and wolds, but they warmed to him for his active support of the York Civic Trust."

More than anything else, "it was the energy, compassion, and integrity of Coggan himself" that made for his success at York. His preaching would often take "a single Greek word and open up its meaning, leaving laity enlightened and encouraged and clergy thirsting for more study".

== Archbishop of Canterbury (1974–1980) ==
In 1974, on the recommendation of the British prime minister, Harold Wilson (himself a Congregationalist), Coggan was appointed by Queen Elizabeth II as the 101st Archbishop of Canterbury. Coggan "agonized four days before accepting Wilson’s recommendation". "The prime minister wanted a quick answer, and I knew I was keeping him waiting", said Coggan, "but I wanted to be sure I was ready to do the job."

As primate-elect, Coggan had his first meeting with the media at Church House, Westminster. He was questioned about being only a "caretaker primate" (He was already 65 and would have to retire at age 70.). He answered that "he would regard it as an honour to take care of his beloved church for five or whatever number of years".

Coggan was invested as the Archbishop of Canterbury in December 1974. He was enthroned on 24 January 1975 at Canterbury Cathedral.

Coggan's enthronement was "the most ecumenical enthronement ever held". For the first time since the English Reformation, the Vatican was represented. There was also "participation by Orthodox patriarchs, representatives of the Methodists, the Quakers and other Free Churches, denominational leaders from all over the world, and heads of Anglican churches in communion with Canterbury."

=== Active administrator ===
In York, Coggan had undertaken "a formidable programme of activity", even for a man of his "energy and discipline". Thus, when his translation to Canterbury was announced "some feared that he might be close to exhaustion". However, he was "a much more active Primate than his predecessor Michael Ramsey". Ramsey spent his 13 years as Archbishop of Canterbury trying to avoid administration. In contrast, Coggan was not only a scholarly theologian, but, as a "company director" would, he kept "a tape recorder handy for prompt dictation".

Being the Archbishop of Canterbury requires administration because it entails four jobs: (1) bishop of the Diocese of Canterbury; (2) Metropolitan of the Province of Canterbury; (3) titular head of the Anglican Communion; and (4) chief chaplain to "the mixed pickles of church and state".

In 1975, Coggan was made a fellow of King's College London in 1975.

=== "Call to the Nation" ===
Coggan broadcast a "Call to the Nation" in 1975. He argued that "economic regeneration had to be accompanied by moral regeneration". In the broadcast he said,

Many are realizing that a materialistic answer is no real answer at all. There are moral and spiritual issues at stake. The truth is that we in Britain are without anchors. We are drifting. A common enemy in two world wars drew us together in united action – and we defeated him. Another enemy is at the gates today, and we keep silence.

In broadcasting the "Call to the Nation", Coggan was the first Archbishop of Canterbury to attempt to communicate en masse beyond the church. Around 28,000 people wrote letters to Coggan in response to his broadcast. The letters included those that addressed the primate as "Dear Lord" as "Your Grace, Chief Godman". For a time, the call "aroused widespread interest, but its long-term impact was negligible".

=== Ordination of women ===
In the early 1960s, Coggan had expressed his support for the ordination of women. He formally proposed it at the Lambeth Conference in 1968. Other bishops had joined Coggan in pushing for the ordination of women but the conference affirmed that "the theological arguments" for and against it are "inconclusive".

=== Evangelism ===
Coggan was described as an "evangelist of zeal". As such, in 1976 he convened a meeting for 'all who were seeking a way forward in evangelism on a national scale' As a result of this meeting, the 'Nationwide Initiative in Evangelism' (NIE) was born.

The NIE was described "as unique in that it represents the first united and positive action in evangelism since the Reformation". The NIE was officially dedicated at a service in the chapel of Lambeth Palace in January 1979. Leaders of churches involved were present, including the Roman Catholic Cardinal Archbishop of Westminster. The NIE did not catch the imagination of Christians around the country. By June 1980 only 200 had booked to attend the Assembly in September 1980 instead of the anticipated 2,000."

Coggan founded the Lord Coggan Memorial Fund which helped to supply Russian children with copies of the Bible.

=== Ecumenism ===
Coggan tried "to make ecumenical progress with other churches". He "pressed repeatedly" for intercommunion with the Roman Catholic Church.

In 1977, during a visit to Rome, Coggan called for full intercommunion between the Anglican Communion and the Roman Catholic Church, taking his hosts completely by surprise.

The visit to Rome took place during an ecumenical tour in which Coggan also went to see the Orthodox Patriarch in Istanbul and the General Secretary of the World Council of Churches in Geneva.

Coggan attended the enthronement in 1978 of Pope John Paul II, the first Archbishop of Canterbury to be present at such a ceremony since the Reformation.

Reaching out to other faiths, Coggan supported the Council of Christians and Jews.

=== 1976 Anglican Consultative Council ===
In 1976, Coggan attended the Anglican Consultative Council meeting in Trinidad from 23 March to 2 April as ex officio president. That meeting was only one of the destinations for Coggan who "travelled more miles than any of his predecessors".

Other destinations on the 1976 trip included Pakistan and India. In India, Coggan visited the memorial to Mahatma Gandhi, an old people's home, and the Indian Prime Minister, Mrs Indira Gandhi.

=== 1977 World Council of Churches ===
In 1977, Coggan and his wife attended the 5th Assembly of the World Council of Churches in Nairobi, Kenya. The youth delegates stayed in a college hostel where they slept in bunk beds. Rather than stay in a fine hotel, Coggan and his wife stayed in the college hostel.

=== 1978 Lambeth Conference ===
Coggan hosted the 1978 Lambeth Conference. For the first time, the Conference was held in Canterbury on the campus of the University of Kent at Canterbury where every subsequent Conference has been held.

Coggan's "relaxed manner and personal interaction with many of the participants" contributed to its success. He was known for his warm welcome and once remarked that "the art of hospitality is to make guests feel at home when you wish they were". The tone of the conference allowed "the anxieties and concerns of the bishops" to be aired. The conference "helped to bring a new coherence to the Anglican Communion".

Coggan also invited bishops to bring their wives, who formed a "separate conference". Jean Coggan was in charge of a committee making arrangements for a conference for bishops' wives. The conference for wives was held at Christ Church College Canterbury on 5–13 August.

=== Nearing retirement ===
Throughout Coggan's primacy, his "wholesome humanity had run like a golden thread". "The joy of being a priest", he said, "is that your work never ends until they carry you out. Then another begins – that's elsewhere."

During his primacy, Coggan had "preached more sermons and travelled more miles than any other of his predecessors".

== Retirement and death ==
Coggan retired on 25 January 1980 at the age of seventy. After Coggan's retirement, he and his wife moved to Sissinghurst in Kent where he had been appointed Assistant Bishop in Canterbury Diocese. He and Lady Coggan moved after some years to Winchester. During his retirement, he received awards and was active in ways that included the following:

- In retirement, Coggan "continued to sally forth, preaching and lecturing far and wide". When not so engaged, he regularly attended the Church of St Swithun's, Winchester where he sometimes accompanied services, playing the piano, surely the only Archbishop ever to have done so. He is commemorated there by his initials carved on a bench-end.
- On 28 January 1980, he was granted a life peerage and made "The Most Revd & Rt Hon. Baron Coggan, of Canterbury and Sissinghurst in the County of Kent.
- On 13 February 1980, he was awarded the Royal Victorian Chain.
- From 1980 to 1988, he served as Assistant Bishop in the Diocese of Canterbury.
- In 1981, he was elected the first Life President of the Church Army.
- From 1983 to 1987, he served as chairman of the executive committee and as a vice-president of the Council of Christians and Jews."
- In 1987, he was invited to the Vatican to help set "Guidelines for Interconfessional Cooperation in Translating the Bible the New Revised Edition Rome".
- He served as Chairman of the Church of England's Catechism Commission, and Chairman of the Church of England's Psalter Revision Commission.

Coggan died at the Old Parsonage Nursing Home, Main Road, Otterbourne, near Winchester, on 17 May 2000, survived by his wife. His funeral service, followed by cremation, was held at St Swithun's, Winchester, on 26 May 2000. A memorial service was held in Winchester Cathedral on 30 June 2000. Coggan's ashes are interred in the cloister garden of Canterbury Cathedral.

Coggan's wife Jean (Lady Coggan, died 2005) played an important supporting role in his ministry. They had two daughters: Ruth Coggan, formerly a missionary doctor of the Church Missionary Society in Pakistan, and Ann Coggan, formerly a teacher at The Pilgrims' School, Winchester.

Church of England titles
Preceded by Alfred Blunt	Bishop of Bradford; 1956–1961	Succeeded by Clement Parker
Preceded by Michael Ramsey	Archbishop of York; 1961–1974	Succeeded by Stuart Blanch
Preceded by Michael Ramsey	Archbishop of Canterbury; 1974–1980	Succeeded by Robert Runcie
