= John Habgood =

Archbishop of York from 1983 to 1995

The Most Reverend and Right Honourable John Habgood PC
- Archbishop of York
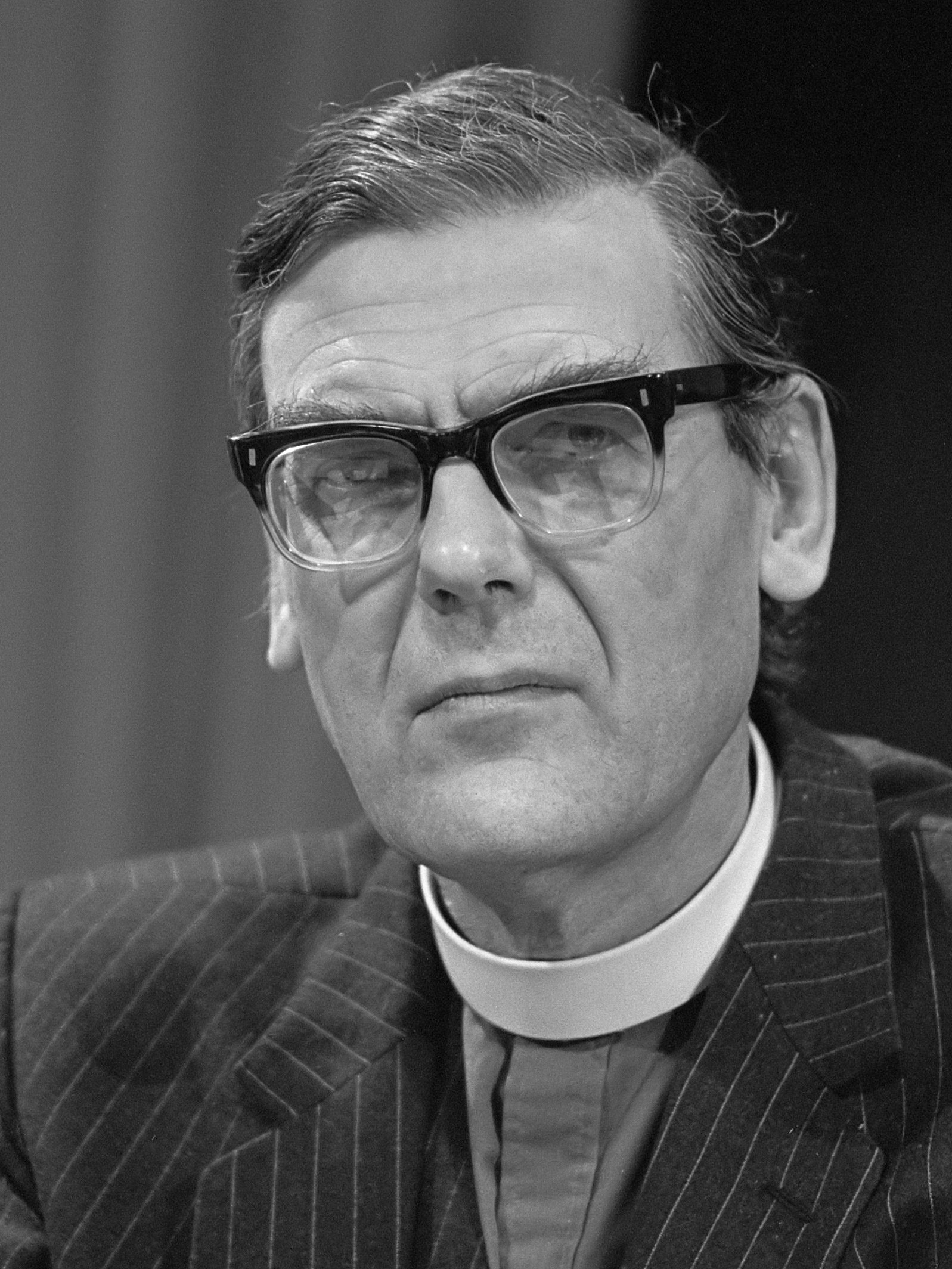
- Habgood in 1981
- Province: Province of York
- Diocese: Diocese of York
- Installed: 18 November 1983
- Term ended: 1995
- Predecessor: Stuart Blanch
- Successor: David Hope
- Other post: Bishop of Durham (1973–1983)

Orders
- Ordination: 1954
- Consecration: 1973

Personal details
- Born: John Stapylton Habgood; 23 June 1927 Wolverton, England
- Died: 6 March 2019 (aged 91) York, England
- Denomination: Anglican
- Education: King's College, Cambridge

Member of the House of Lords
- Lord Temporal
- Life peerage 7 September 1995 – 3 October 2011
- Lord Spiritual
- In office 4 July 1973 – 7 September 1995

John Stapylton Habgood, Baron Habgood, PC (23 June 1927 – 6 March 2019) was a British Anglican bishop, academic, and life peer. He was Bishop of Durham from 1973 to 1983, and Archbishop of York from 18 November 1983 to 1995. In 1995, he was made a life peer and so continued to serve in the House of Lords after stepping down as archbishop. He took a leave of absence in later life, and in 2011 was one of the first peers to explicitly retire from the Lords.

== Personal life ==
Habgood was born in Wolverton, Buckinghamshire, on 23 June 1927, the son of Dr Arthur Henry Habgood and his wife Vera. He was educated at Eton, King's College, Cambridge and Ripon College Cuddesdon. A University Demonstrator in Pharmacology from 1950, he became a fellow of King's College, Cambridge in 1952. Also in 1952, he was awarded a Doctor of Philosophy (PhD) degree for his thesis titled "Hyperalgesia: an electro-physiological approach".

In 1961 Habgood married Rosalie Mary Anne Boston (died 2016); he had two daughters and two sons, including Francis Habgood, formerly Chief Constable of Thames Valley Police.

Habgood had Alzheimer's disease in his later years, and died at a care home in York on 6 March 2019, at the age of 91.

== Early ministry ==
Habgood was ordained in the Church of England as a deacon in 1954 and as a priest in 1955. From 1954 to 1956, he was a curate at St Mary Abbots Church, Kensington, London. From 1956 to 1962 he was Vice-Principal of Westcott House theological college in Cambridge. From 1962 to 1967 he was Rector of St John's Church, Jedburgh. In 1967 he became Principal of Queen's College, Edgbaston, a theological college, until his appointment to the episcopate.

He was consecrated a bishop and appointed as Bishop of Durham in 1973. He was passed over by Margaret Thatcher for appointment as Bishop of London in 1981.

== Archbishop of York ==
Habgood was elevated to Archbishop of York on 18 November 1983. The other name put forward for the Prime Minister's consideration was that of former England cricketer, David Sheppard, by then Bishop of Liverpool. Sheppard's socialist views – he later sat in the Lords as a Labour Peer – did not commend him to Thatcher. As an archbishop, Habgood was made a Privy Counsellor in 1983.

As Archbishop of York, Habgood was seen as a leader in keeping more conservative Anglicans within the church during growing divisions over the issue of women's ordination to the priesthood. He supported the ordination of women to the priesthood, arguing that God is neither male nor female. He also supported accommodating those who did not, and so introduced provincial episcopal visitors to provide pastoral care and oversight to laity, clergy, and parishes who could not accept women priests. In May 1991, he was invited to preach the sermon at the National Service of Remembrance and Thanksgiving for the end of the Gulf War at Glasgow Cathedral. Habgood retired as Archbishop of York in August 1995.

=== Canterbury ===
When Robert Runcie announced his retirement as Archbishop of Canterbury in 1990, Habgood was regarded as one of the favourites to succeed him. The religious journalist Clifford Longley described him as "the outstanding churchman of his generation", although noting that Habgood had described himself as too old. As preparations for the selection of the new archbishop began, Habgood gave a television interview stating that he was interested in being considered as "if I believed that this is what the church really wanted and if I believed that this is what God really wanted I would be under a strong obligation to say yes." At the same time it was reported that Habgood was not popular among those close to the Prime Minister, Margaret Thatcher, who would make the actual recommendation to the Queen. Habgood had also attracted criticism inside and outside the Church for his behaviour during the 1987 Crockford's Clerical Directory preface controversy. Habgood was widely perceived as having led the witch-hunt which precipitated Dr Gareth Bennett's death.

At the beginning of May a report in the Sunday Correspondent stated that four candidates were under active consideration: Habgood, David Sheppard (Bishop of Liverpool), Colin James (Bishop of Winchester) and John Waine (Bishop of Chelmsford). Habgood declined to take up the automatic place he could have had on the Crown Appointments Commission, which would select the two names to be given to the Prime Minister. He was endorsed in a leader in The Times on 10 July 1990. On 25 July it was announced that the next Archbishop of Canterbury would be George Carey, the Bishop of Bath and Wells. Habgood described him as "a good choice", adding that "there is a little human bit in anybody that likes the top job, but that is a very small part in my feelings. In my heart of hearts I didn't really want the job. If it had come five years ago I might have thought differently but you slow up and it is an enormously tiring job."

== House of Lords ==
From his appointment as Bishop of Durham in 1973 to his retirement as Archbishop of York in 1995, Habgood sat in the House of Lords as a Lord Spiritual. This was due to the senior rankings of the two bishoprics in the Church of England, which each granted an automatic seat in the Lords. He voted against Section 28 of the Local Government Act 1988 which banned local authorities from "promoting homosexuality" and state schools from teaching the "acceptability of homosexuality as a pretended family relationship": it was later repealed in 2000 in Scotland and in 2003 in the rest of the UK.

Habgood was created a life peer as Baron Habgood, of Calverton in the County of Buckinghamshire on 8 September 1995, allowing him to continue to sit in the House of Lords as a Lord Temporal. He sat as a crossbencher, rather than join a political party. Later in his life he ceased attending the Lords and took leave of absence; on 3 October 2011 he became one of the first two peers to formally and permanently retire from membership under a newly instituted procedure that was created before permanent retirement achieved full legal recognition under the House of Lords Reform Act 2014.

== Religion and science ==
Habgood was a member and past president of The Science and Religion Forum. He wrote in this area, e.g., his book Truths in Tension: New Perspectives on Religion and Science (1965). Another example of his work in this area is "Faith, Science and the Future: the Conference Sermon", which was given at the World Council of Churches' conference on Faith, Science and the Future held on the MIT campus (12–24 July 1979). In 2000, he delivered the Gifford Lectures on The Concept of Nature at the University of Aberdeen. An early 21st-century example is his review of Ronald L. Numbers's book The Creationists, which Habgood titled "The creation of Creationism: Today's brand of Protestant extremism should worry theologians as well as scientists".

== Books ==
- Religion and Science (1964; 1965 U.S. publication retitled to Truths in Tension: New Perspectives on Religion and Science)

A Cavendish Professor of Physics and Nobel Laureate, Nevill Mott, has cited this book:

"I am impressed too by the point of view of the present Archbishop of York (John Habgood, Science and Religion, [London: Hodder and Stoughton, 1964]), that to understand the Bible we must try to enter into the belief patterns of the period".

- A Working Faith (1980)
- Church and Nation in a Secular Age (1983)
- Confessions of a Conservative Liberal (1988)
- Making Sense (1993)
- Faith and Uncertainty (1997)
- Being a Person (1998)
- Varieties of Unbelief (2000)
- The Concept of Nature (2002)

== Arms ==
Coat of arms of John Habgood
Escutcheon Per pale Azure and Gules a cross Ermine floretty Or between in dexter chief and sinister base a key in pale wards outwards and in sinister chief and dexter base a lion’s head erased also Or that in chief langued Azure and that in base langued Gules. Motto Per Aspera Virtus

== See also ==
- List of science and religion scholars

Academic offices
Preceded by Arthur Gribble	Principal of Queen's College, Birmingham; 1967–1973	Succeeded by Anthony Bird
Church of England titles
Preceded by Ian Ramsey	Bishop of Durham; 1973–1983	Succeeded by David Jenkins
Preceded by Stuart Blanch	Archbishop of York; 1983–1995	Succeeded by David Hope
