= John Biffen =

British politician (1930-2007)

The Right Honourable The Lord Biffen PC DL
- Portrait by Walter Bird, 1965

Lord Keeper of the Privy Seal
- In office 11 June 1983 – 13 June 1987
- Prime Minister: Margaret Thatcher
- Preceded by: The Baroness Young
- Succeeded by: John Wakeham

Leader of the House of Commons
- In office 7 April 1982 – 13 June 1987
- Prime Minister: Margaret Thatcher
- Preceded by: Francis Pym
- Succeeded by: John Wakeham

Lord President of the Council
- In office 7 April 1982 – 11 June 1983
- Prime Minister: Margaret Thatcher
- Preceded by: Francis Pym
- Succeeded by: William Whitelaw

Secretary of State for Trade
- In office 5 January 1981 – 6 April 1982
- Prime Minister: Margaret Thatcher
- Preceded by: John Nott
- Succeeded by: The Lord Cockfield

Chief Secretary to the Treasury
- In office 4 May 1979 – 5 January 1981
- Prime Minister: Margaret Thatcher
- Chancellor: Geoffrey Howe
- Preceded by: Joel Barnett
- Succeeded by: Leon Brittan

Shadow Secretary of State for Industry
- In office 19 November 1976 – 28 February 1977
- Leader: Margaret Thatcher
- Preceded by: Michael Heseltine
- Succeeded by: Keith Joseph

Shadow Secretary of State for Energy
- In office 15 January 1976 – 19 November 1976
- Leader: Margaret Thatcher
- Preceded by: Patrick Jenkin
- Succeeded by: Tom King

Member of the House of Lords
- Lord Temporal
- Life peerage 3 June 1997 – 14 August 2007

Member of Parliament for North Shropshire Oswestry (1961–1983)
- In office 9 November 1961 – 8 April 1997
- Preceded by: David Ormsby-Gore
- Succeeded by: Owen Paterson

Personal details
- Born: William John Biffen; 3 November 1930 Bridgwater, England
- Died: 14 August 2007 (aged 76) Shrewsbury, England
- Party: Conservative
- Spouse: Sarah Wood (m. 1979)
- Education: Jesus College, Cambridge

William John Biffen, Baron Biffen, PC, DL (3 November 1930 – 14 August 2007), was a British Conservative Party politician. He was a member of parliament from 1961 to 1997, and served in Margaret Thatcher's cabinet; he then served in the House of Lords.

== Early life and education ==
The son of Victor William Biffen, a tenant farmer, of Hill Farm, Otterhampton, Bridgwater, Somerset, and his wife Edith Annie ('Tish'), John Biffen was born in Bridgwater in 1930. He was educated firstly at Combwich village school, followed by Dr. Morgan's Grammar School, Bridgwater. He then earned a scholarship to Jesus College, Cambridge, where he graduated with a first class honours degree in history. From 1953 to 1960 he worked for Tube Investments Ltd. In the 1960s he joined the Mont Pelerin Society.

== Political career ==
Having previously stood unsuccessfully against Richard Crossman at Coventry East in 1959, Biffen was the member of parliament (MP) for the constituency of Oswestry, later renamed Shropshire North, from the time of his election at a by-election in 1961 until his retirement at the 1997 general election.

In his early political career he was a disciple of Enoch Powell, voting for him in the Conservative leadership election of 1965. Biffen was a Eurosceptic and voted in a parliamentary division in 1972, opposing his own party, against the UK's entry into the EC. He championed tight fiscal policy and opposed state intervention in economic management. This stance barred his way to advancement under Edward Heath, but contributed to his promotion under Margaret Thatcher.

=== In government ===
Biffen served in Thatcher's government in the successive positions of Chief Secretary to the Treasury, Secretary of State for Trade, and as Leader of the House of Commons. Thatcher writes in The Downing Street Years (1993) that "[Biffen] had been a brilliant exponent in Opposition of the economic policies in which I believed... But he proved rather less effective than I had hoped in the gruelling task of trying to control public expenditure."

In 1981, he allowed Rupert Murdoch to buy The Times and The Sunday Times without reference to the Monopolies Commission. According to Woodrow Wyatt, who helped persuade Thatcher to ensure this, the Commission "almost certainly would have blocked it".

As Leader of the House, Biffen used the guillotine to cut short debate on the European Communities (Amendment) Act 1986. Edward Pearce has written that Biffen "was widely thought the best post-war floor leader".

Biffen's image as an economic "dry" mellowed during his time in government, and he made blunt public calls for greater moderation in government policy. In 1980 he warned the country to prepare for "three years of unparalleled austerity". In 1981 Biffen gave a speech to a fringe meeting at that year's Conservative Party Conference in which he argued the party was "within touching distance of the débâcles of 1906 and 1945". He further claimed that far from cutting public spending, the government had increased it by two per cent since 1979 and that the government was part of an all-party consensus in favour of the welfare state and public spending: "We are all social democrats now", Biffen concluded in his speech.

On 9 February 1986, he said that Toryism was "not a raucous political faction" and after the Conservative Party's losses in the 1986 local government elections, and poor performances in the two parliamentary by-elections held simultaneously, Biffen was interviewed on Weekend World by Brian Walden on 11 May as the government's spokesman. He called the results "Black Thursday", said the Conservatives needed to fight the next general election on a "balanced ticket" and that "no one seriously supposes that the Prime Minister would be Prime Minister throughout the entire period of the next Parliament". This alienated him from Thatcher and resulted in his being dropped from the Cabinet following the 1987 general election. His dismissal was no surprise, in that Thatcher's press secretary Bernard Ingham had already famously called him a "semi-detached" member of the Cabinet. Thatcher in her memoirs described Biffen's desire for a balanced ticket as "foolish" and "a recipe for paralysis." Nevertheless, Thatcher later admitted that Biffen's departure from the Cabinet was "a loss in some ways", because of his Euroscepticism and his "sound instincts on economic matters". In the month after his sacking Biffen likened Thatcher's governing style to that of a "Stalinist regime".

Despite his right-wing views on economic policy, he was very much to the left of Thatcher on social policy. Similarly to Powell, he completely opposed capital punishment and was very supportive of equal gay rights but wanted less immigration. Biffen also opposed the tightening of laws restricting abortion and voted in 1990 to preserve the limit at 28 weeks.

Brian Walden noted that Biffen was the "most honest" politician he had interviewed.

=== Return to the Backbench ===
On the backbenches Biffen voted against the Local Government Finance Act 1988 which introduced the Community Charge (the poll tax). He voted against the Maastricht Treaty and was in favour of a referendum on the EU Constitution so he could vote "No".

=== House of Lords ===
On 3 June 1997 he was created a life peer, as Baron Biffen, of Tanat in the County of Shropshire.

== Personal life ==
Biffen married Sarah Wood in 1979. He had one stepson, Nicholas Wood, a correspondent with The New York Times and International Herald Tribune, and a stepdaughter, Lucy. The family lived at Tanat House, Llanyblodwel.

Biffen died from heart failure at Royal Shrewsbury Hospital on 14 August 2007, aged 76. He had also suffered from kidney failure for many years.

== In popular culture ==
Biffen was portrayed by Roger Brierley in the 2004 BBC production of The Alan Clark Diaries.

== Bibliography ==
- John Biffen, Nation in Doubt (Conservative Political Centre, 1976).
- John Biffen, Political Office, or Political Power?: Six Speeches on National and International Affairs (Centre for Policy Studies, 1977).
- John Biffen, 'The Conservatism of Labour', in Maurice Cowling (ed.), Conservative Essays (Cassell, 1978), pp. 155–167.
- John Biffen, 'Inside the House of Commons', (1989).
- John Biffen, Inside Westminster (Andre Deutsch Ltd, 1996).

Parliament of the United Kingdom
Preceded by David Ormsby-Gore	Member of Parliament for Oswestry; 1961–1983	Constituency abolished
New constituency	Member of Parliament for North Shropshire; 1983–1997	Succeeded by Owen Paterson
Political offices
Preceded by Joel Barnett	Chief Secretary to the Treasury; 1979–1981	Succeeded by Leon Brittan
Preceded by John Nott	Secretary of State for Trade; 1981–1982	Succeeded by The Lord Cockfield
Preceded by Francis Pym	Lord President of the Council; 1982–1983	Succeeded by The Viscount Whitelaw
Preceded by Francis Pym	Leader of the House of Commons; 1982–1987	Succeeded by John Wakeham
Preceded by The Baroness Young	Lord Privy Seal; 1983–1987	Succeeded by John Wakeham
