= Stuart Blanch =

Archbishop of York from 1975 to 1983

The Most Reverend and Right Honourable Stuart Blanch PC
- Archbishop of York
- Blanch as Bishop of Liverpool
- Installed: 1975
- Term ended: 1983
- Predecessor: Donald Coggan
- Successor: John Habgood

Personal details
- Born: 2 February 1918 Blakeney, Gloucestershire, England
- Died: 3 June 1994 (aged 76) Banbury, Oxfordshire, England

Member of the House of Lords
- Lord Temporal
- Life peerage 5 September 1983 – 3 June 1994
- Lord Spiritual
- In office 8 November 1972 – 31 August 1983

Stuart Yarworth Blanch, Baron Blanch, PC (2 February 1918 – 3 June 1994) was an Anglican clergyman. Little interested in religion in his youth, he became a committed Christian at the age of 21, while serving in the Royal Air Force during the Second World War.

He was ordained as a priest in 1949, and spent three years as a curate and five years as a vicar in and around Oxford where he had studied for the priesthood. He was vice principal of Wycliffe Hall, Oxford from 1957 to 1960, the founding head of Rochester Theological College from 1960 to 1966, Bishop of Liverpool from 1966 to 1975, and Archbishop of York from 1975 to 1983.

Blanch was evangelical in outlook, but gained the trust of high church Anglicans, and also of Roman Catholics and nonconformists. He was well known as a lecturer and published ten books, most of them scholarly and theological.

== Life and career ==
=== Early years ===
Blanch was born at Viney Hill Farm, Blakeney, Gloucestershire in the Forest of Dean, the youngest of three sons of a farmer, William Edwin Blanch, and his wife, Elizabeth, née Yarworth. William Blanch was killed in a shooting accident in 1923 and his widow and youngest child moved to London, where the two older sons were already living. Blanch attended Alleyn's School, Dulwich, winning a scholarship after the first year. His mother could not afford to pay for him to go to a university, and after leaving school at the age of 18 he started work. He would have preferred to become a journalist, but found that "journalism in particular was hard to get into without contacts." He gained employment in the office of the Law Fire Insurance Society Ltd in Chancery Lane at a salary of £90 a year. He said later, "The job taught me a great deal, not just about administration – how to write letters and so on – but how to deal with people from all walks of life."

On the outbreak of the Second World War Blanch enlisted in the Royal Air Force. He was on guard duty at Christmas at the RAF depot in Heaton Park (not, he later said, "a prospect to quicken the pulse or engender much seasonal cheer"), and for lack of anything else to read he read the New Testament thoroughly for the first time in his life, and his hitherto mild adherence to Christianity was turned into firm evangelical faith. "This strange book spoke, its words glowed on the page, and I knew that from that moment my life was bound up for better or worse with the Man who is described there."

In the RAF he served as a corporal in the force's police, and then volunteered for aircrew duties. After training as a navigator, he was commissioned as a flight lieutenant. He flew reconnaissance missions over Burma from Calcutta. During this period he became an Anglican lay reader and sought ordination as a priest. In 1943 he married Brenda Gertrude Coyte. His biographer R H L Williams writes, "Their years of wartime separation were bridged by a remarkable correspondence in which they explored their faith together."

=== Priest ===
On demobilisation Blanch was accepted for ordination training at Wycliffe Hall, Oxford. His ability impressed the principal, Canon J P Thornton-Duesbery, who arranged for him to be matriculated at St Catherine's Society. He obtained a first class degree in theology in 1948, and was ordained priest in 1949. After three years as a curate in the Oxford parish of Highfield, he was appointed vicar of Eynsham a few miles out of the city. He remained there for five years, building up a small congregation into a large one, described by The Times as "thoroughly committed to Christian outreach." He formed close ties with the local Roman Catholic, Baptist, and Methodist churches. This was Blanch's only experience as a parish priest. While he was at Eynsham three of the Blanches' five children were born, all daughters. He was a part-time lecturer during this period, and his lectures on the New Testament led to an invitation to return to Wycliffe Hall as tutor and vice-principal to F J Taylor, who had succeeded Thornton-Duesbery as principal. Blanch took up the appointment in 1957

The chairman of the governing body of Wycliffe Hall was the Bishop of Rochester, Christopher Chavasse. Nearing the end of his twenty-year reign at Rochester, Chavasse wished it to culminate in the foundation of an evangelical theological college for mature students. He persuaded Blanch to become the founding head of the college and Oriel canon of Rochester Cathedral. Blanch was Warden of Rochester Theological College from 1960 to 1966. The Independent's obituary of Blanch said of this period:

It proved to be an admirable appointment and Blanch revelled in the opportunity of preparing for ordination a very mixed bunch of students all aged between 30 and 40. Few of them had an academic background and they were mostly men set fair in their careers as engineers, policemen, garage proprietors, farmers and in many other trades and professions. Blanch delighted in arousing their enthusiasm for the scriptures and enlarging their vision of world-wide Christianity.

During this period, the Blanches had a son and a daughter.

=== Bishop ===
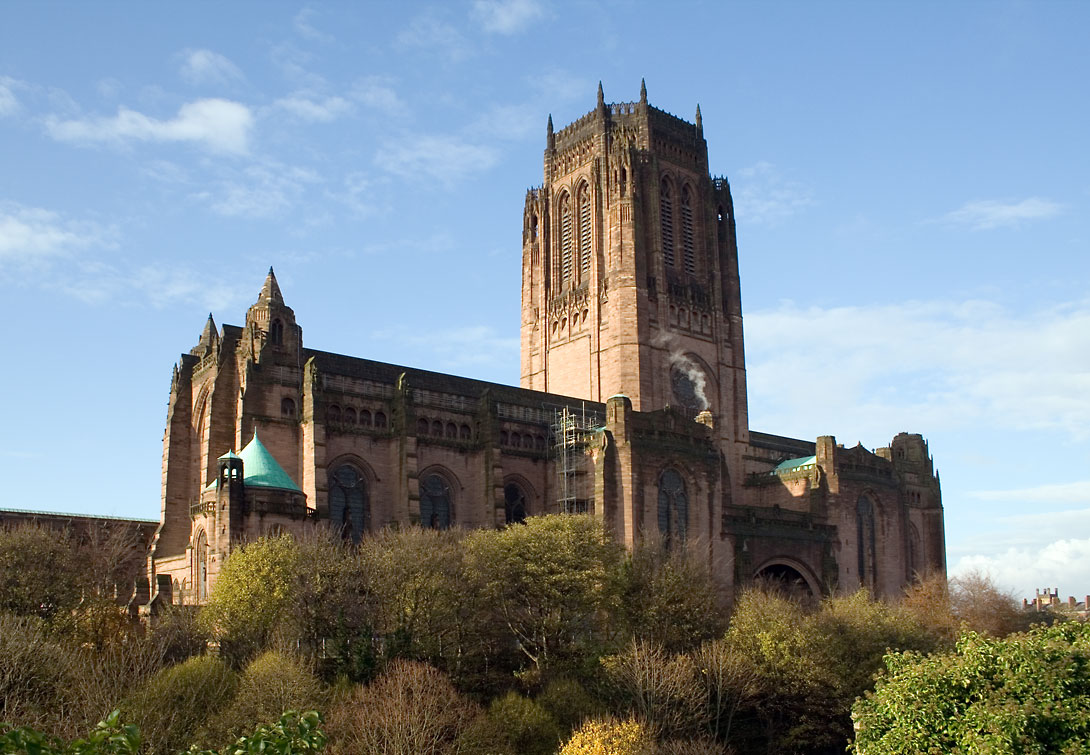
Liverpool Cathedral

In 1966, the Prime Minister, Harold Wilson, invited Blanch to succeed Clifford Martin as Bishop of Liverpool. On opening Wilson's letter Blanch is said to have taken it for a prank by Rochester students. He was not altogether pleased by the offer. Because he had acquired his faith not from churchgoing but from his private reading of the New Testament, he was, in the words of The Independent, "uncoloured and uninfluenced by anything ecclesiastical and failed to see the relevance of much of it." The prospect of exchanging academic life for the complexities of a bishop's duties was daunting. The Times later said, "He was at that time a bad chairman of committees and councils (he got better at it) and he knew there would be plenty of both. He did not know Lancashire. But he knew his duty and off he went to Merseyside." Aged 47 he was the youngest Anglican bishop of his day.

In the 1960s Liverpool underwent large-scale rehousing, with residents of inner city slums being moved to new housing estates on greenfield sites outside the city. Blanch supervised the resulting reorganisation of parishes and construction of new churches. The diocese was predominantly evangelical, but there was a substantial high church minority whose relations with some previous Bishops of Liverpool had been difficult. The Guardian said that one of Blanch's greatest achievements during his years in Liverpool (and later at York) was reconciling evangelical and high church Anglicans: "it was universally acknowledged that he left behind him a peaceful and reconciled diocese." The Times comments that Blanch and his wife "threw themselves into the richness of Liverpool life. He grew to love Scouse humour and resilience. He bicycled to work … he played squash most Saturday mornings … whenever he could, he went to listen to the Philharmonic concerts (Sir Charles Groves, the then conductor, becoming a firm friend)."

As he had done as a parish priest at Eynsham, Blanch reached out to other Christian denominations. He established friendships and close working relationships with George Beck and Rex Kissack, respectively the Roman Catholic archbishop of Liverpool and the chairman of the Liverpool Methodist District. They helped to end Liverpool's history of sectarian hostility, and fostered ecumenism in what became known as the "Mersey miracle", built upon by their successors.

While Bishop of Liverpool, Blanch had numerous invitations to give lectures, as far afield as Alabama and Bermuda. The first of his ten books, The World our Orphanage (1972) was based on a series of lectures he gave in York.

=== Archbishop ===
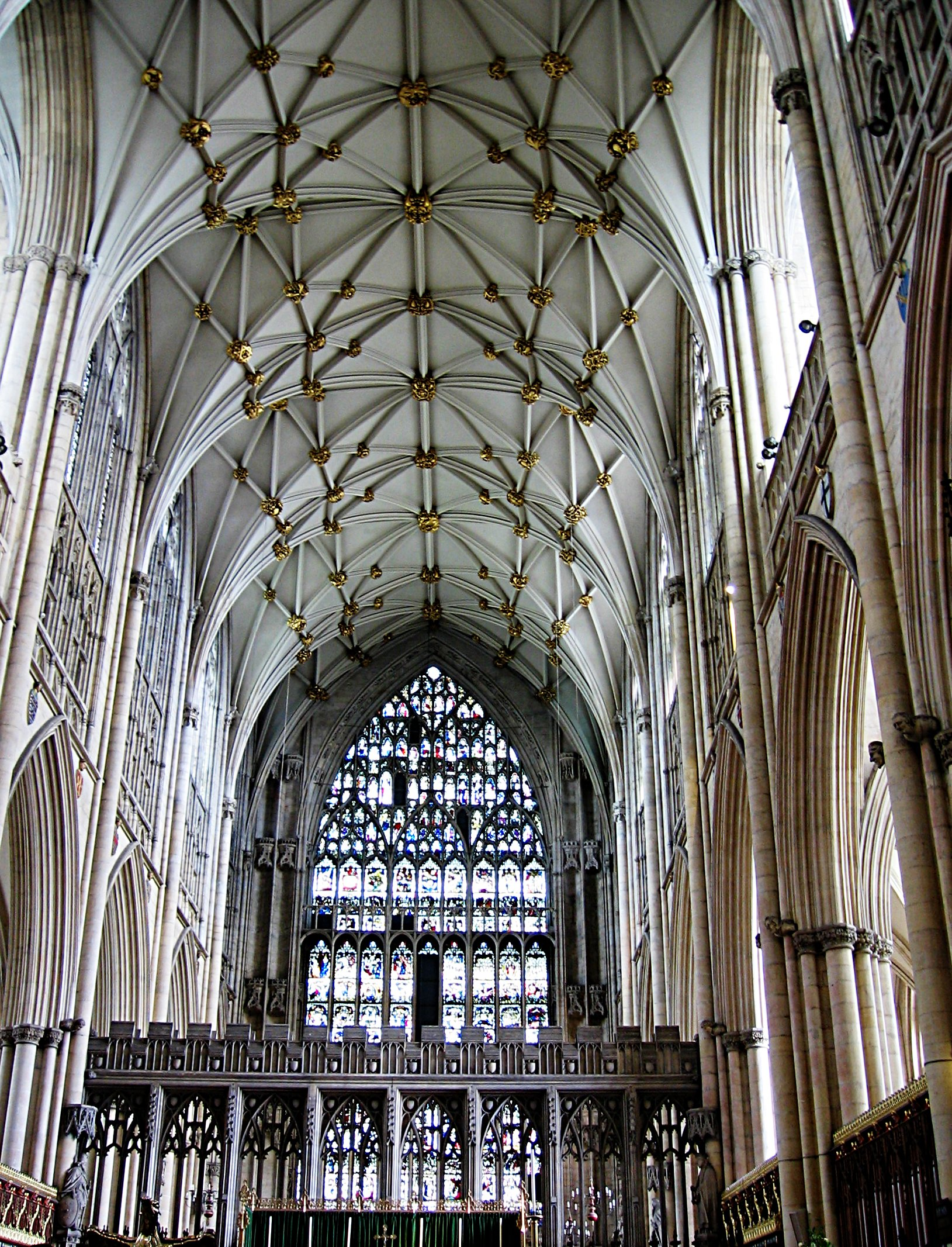
Interior of York Minster

In 1974 the Archbishop of Canterbury, Michael Ramsey, announced his forthcoming retirement. His successor was the Archbishop of York, Donald Coggan, an evangelical. In view of the church's tradition of balance it was widely expected that Coggan's successor at York would be a higher churchman. The two candidates most tipped were Robert Runcie (Bishop of St Albans) and Kenneth Woollcombe (Bishop of Oxford). There was a long delay in making the appointment, and it was rumoured that at least three bishops had declined the post. The Times later named one of them as Runcie. The offer of the archbishopric to Blanch came as a surprise to him. He said that the Prime Minister's invitation "came in one of those plain white envelopes that you open with caution. I am only now beginning to get over the shock." He told the press that he found the prospect daunting because he was at a loss with high formality, was not well up on central church administration and had not much political experience.

Blanch was enthroned as ninety-fourth archbishop of York on 25 February 1975. Of his years as archbishop, Williams writes, "A superb pastor, he presided over a happy diocese and travelled widely in his province. … No lover of bureaucracy, he was described as the most unecclesiastical of archbishops." One admirer, noting his common touch, said that he wore a flat cap underneath his mitre. In fact, as an evangelical, Blanch was not enthusiastic about vestments and seldom wore a mitre.

Blanch's reputation as a theologian and lecturer continued to grow. The Guardian said of him, "At York, Blanch emerged as one of the most thoughtful and touching preachers ever to occupy an archiepiscopal throne." Williams notes that while at York, Blanch made ten working trips abroad, carrying out engagements in fifteen countries, in Europe, Australasia, Asia and the Americas. Academically his strong point was Old Testament scholarship, and this enabled him to establish close ties with the Jewish community.

In 1981 Blanch suffered a breakdown in his health. He was absent from his ecclesiastical work for only a month, but thereafter, according to The Times:

He got better, but for many of his friends the famous sparkle seemed to have gone and the zest had abated. The idea got about that he was simply coasting to his retirement, so that academic work could come to the fore again. It seemed that he was less and less ready to play any kind of prominent role in the life of the nation. He was not a great pronouncer on the issues of the day, nor was he an innovator in Church affairs.

He resigned in 1983, and was the first retiring archbishop of York to be made a life peer immediately, (Note: His predecessors Ramsey and Coggan were also made life peers upon retiring from their subsequent position as Archbishop of Canterbury.) being created Baron Blanch of Bishopthorpe in the County of North Yorkshire on 5 September 1983.

=== Last years ===
Blanch retired to Oxfordshire, living first in Bloxham and then in Shenington. He conducted services at Shenington parish church, and continued to lecture and write. He made four more lecture trips abroad after retiring from York, and wrote two more books.

Blanch died of cancer at a hospice in Banbury, Oxfordshire at the age of 76, and was buried in Shenington churchyard. He was survived by his wife, son, and three of the four daughters, the eldest predeceasing him.

== Bibliography ==
Books published by Blanch were:

- The World Our Orphanage – Studies in the Theology of the Bible. London: Epworth Press. 1972. ISBN 0716202085.
- For all Mankind – A Book About the Old Testament and About Us. London: Bible Reading Fellowship. 1976. ISBN 0900164352.
- The Christian Militant – Lent with St. Mark's Gospel. London: Society for Promoting Christian Knowledge. 1978. ISBN 0281035911.
- The Burning Bush – Signs of Our Time. Guildford: Lutterworth Press. 1978. ISBN 071882346X.
- The Trumpet in the Morning – Law and Freedom Today in the Light of the Hebraeo-Christian Tradition. London: Hodder and Stoughton. 1979. ISBN 0340246391.
- The Ten Commandments. London: Hodder & Stoughton. 1981. ISBN 0340271493.
- Living by Faith. London: Darton, Longman and Todd. 1983. ISBN 0232515719.
- Way of Blessedness. London: Hodder and Stoughton. 1985. ISBN 0340346434.
- Encounters with Jesus. London: Hodder and Stoughton. 1988. ISBN 034042592X.
- Future Patterns of Episcopacy – Reflections in Retirement. Oxford: Latimer House. 1991. ISBN 0946307350.

== Arms ==
Coat of arms of Stuart Blanch
Coronet A Coronet of a Baron Crest Issuing from a Circlet of Double Roses alternately Gules on Argent and Argent on Gules all barbed and seeded proper two Lions' Gambs Gules armed Or supporting between them a Cross Crosslet Argent floretty Or Escutcheon Argent on a Pairle Gules a Rose Argent barbed and seeded Or between three Cross Crosslets fitchy towards the fess point Argent floretty Or Supporters On either side a Scottish Sheepdog Or charged on the breast with a Heart Gules enflamed proper Motto Via veritas vita

== See also ==
- Archbishop Blanch School, a secondary school for girls in Liverpool, named after Blanch

== Notes ==
Church of England titles
Preceded by Clifford Martin	Bishop of Liverpool; 1966–1975	Succeeded by David Sheppard
Preceded by Donald Coggan	Archbishop of York; 1975–1983	Succeeded by John Habgood
