= Norman Fowler, Baron Fowler =

British politician (born 1938)

The Right Honourable The Lord Fowler PC
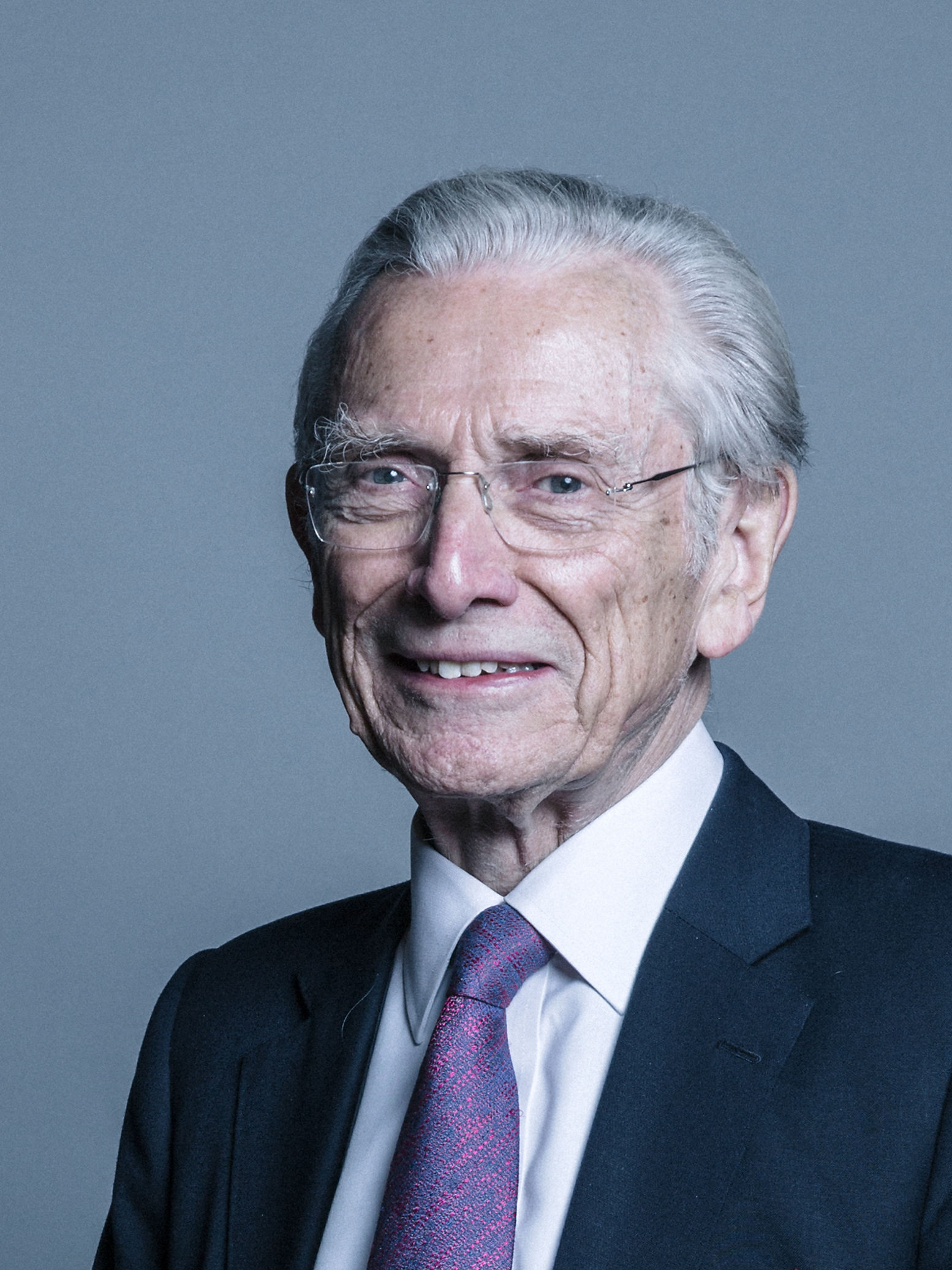
- Official portrait, 2018

Lord Speaker
- In office 1 September 2016 – 30 April 2021
- Monarch: Elizabeth II
- Deputy: The Lord McFall of Alcluith
- Preceded by: The Baroness D'Souza
- Succeeded by: The Lord McFall of Alcluith
Shadow cabinet 1997–99
Shadow Home Secretary
In office 2 June 1998 – 14 June 1999
Leader	William Hague
Preceded by	Brian Mawhinney
Succeeded by	Ann Widdecombe
Shadow Secretary of State for Environment, Transport and the Regions
In office 11 June 1997 – 1 June 1998
Leader	William Hague
Preceded by	Sir George Young
Succeeded by	Gillian Shephard

Chairman of the Conservative Party
- In office 11 May 1992 – 15 July 1994
- Leader: John Major
- Preceded by: Chris Patten
- Succeeded by: Jeremy Hanley

Secretary of State for Employment
- In office 13 June 1987 – 3 January 1990
- Prime Minister: Margaret Thatcher
- Preceded by: The Lord Young of Graffham
- Succeeded by: Michael Howard

Secretary of State for Social Services
- In office 14 September 1981 – 13 June 1987
- Prime Minister: Margaret Thatcher
- Preceded by: Patrick Jenkin
- Succeeded by: John Moore

Secretary of State for Transport (Note: Known as Minister of Transport until January 1981.)
- In office 4 May 1979 – 14 September 1981
- Prime Minister: Margaret Thatcher
- Preceded by: Bill Rodgers
- Succeeded by: David Howell
Shadow Cabinet 1975–79
Shadow Minister of State for Transport
In office 15 January 1976 – 4 May 1979
Leader	Margaret Thatcher
Succeeded by	Bill Rodgers (Note: As Shadow Minister of Transport.)
Shadow Secretary of State for Social Services
In office 18 February 1975 – 15 January 1976
Leader	Margaret Thatcher
Succeeded by	Patrick Jenkin
Parliamentary Representation
Member of the House of Lords
Lord Temporal
Life peerage 3 July 2001
Member of Parliament for Sutton Coldfield
In office 28 February 1974 – 14 May 2001
Preceded by	Geoffrey Lloyd
Succeeded by	Andrew Mitchell
Member of Parliament for Nottingham South
In office 18 June 1970 – 8 February 1974
Preceded by	George Perry
Succeeded by	Constituency abolished

Personal details
- Born: Peter Norman Fowler; 2 February 1938 (age 88) Chelmsford, Essex, England
- Party: Crossbench
- Other political affiliations: Conservative (until 2016); None (Lord Speaker) (2016–2021)
- Spouse: Fiona Poole (m. 1979)
- Children: 2
- Education: Trinity Hall, Cambridge

Peter Norman Fowler, Baron Fowler (born 2 February 1938) is a British politician who served as a member of both Margaret Thatcher and John Major's ministries during the 1980s and 1990s. He held the office of Lord Speaker from 1 September 2016 to 30 April 2021.

After serving as Shadow Minister of Transport, Fowler was appointed Minister of Transport in 1979, being responsible for making seat belts compulsory. Later, as Secretary of State for Social Services, he drew public attention to the dangers of AIDS. He resigned from the cabinet as Employment Secretary, and was knighted in 1990.

Fowler was Chairman of the Conservative Party from 1992 to 1994, Shadow Secretary of State for Environment, Transport and the Regions from 1997 to 1998, and Shadow Home Secretary from 1998 to 1999. In 2001, he left the House of Commons and later that year was created a Conservative life peer. As is customary for presiding officers, he renounced his party political allegiance upon taking office as Lord Speaker. On 25 February 2021, he announced that in April he would step down as Lord Speaker to focus on campaigning work, particularly in relation to AIDS. He continues to sit in the House of Lords.

== Early life ==
Fowler was born on 2 February 1938 to Norman Frederick Fowler and Katherine (née Baker). He is an only child. He was educated at King Edward VI Grammar School in Chelmsford, Essex. After school, he did National Service as a second lieutenant in the Essex Regiment. He then studied at Trinity Hall, Cambridge (BA Economics & Law 1961). He was Chairman of the Cambridge University Conservative Association in Michaelmas 1960, in which term he entertained both the Prime Minister Harold Macmillan and Home Secretary Rab Butler. Following university, he became a journalist, and worked at The Times.

== Member of Parliament ==
Fowler, who had aspired to become an MP since childhood, was elected for Nottingham South in 1970; after the seat was abolished, he switched to Sutton Coldfield at the February 1974 election.

=== In opposition ===
From 1976 until 1979, Fowler was Shadow Minister for Transport. In April 1976, he was photographed outside the Palace of Westminster having just taken delivery of his third four-cylinder MG MGB GT — he had reportedly rejected the idea of buying a V8 version on account of its cost.

=== In government ===
Upon Margaret Thatcher becoming prime minister in 1979, she did not immediately appoint Fowler to her Cabinet, explaining: "we were short of one place. As a result, Norman Fowler, as Minister of State at Transport, was not able to be an official member of the Cabinet, although he attended all our meetings."

As secretary of state for transport, Fowler drove through Lord Nugent's 1981 bill to make seat belts compulsory, a law that came into force in 1983.

As secretary of state for social services in 1986, Fowler implemented the first official drive to educate the British public as to the dangers of AIDS and how transmission could be reduced. Under his tenure, awareness about how the disease was spread was transmitted widely — including through public health posters, newspaper advertisements, and television campaigns. The main public health campaign, labeled "Don't Die of Ignorance", included mailing a leaflet to 23 million homes. By 1987, a Gallup Poll showed that 98% of the public was aware of how HIV was transmitted, and the vast majority supported Fowler's campaign. By 1990, infection rates in the UK were below those of peer nations, including France and the US.

Some Conservatives, including Thatcher herself, objected to the frank content of these messages, which contained material about needle usage and intravenous drugs, as well as discussions about the risks of unprotected sex. During this time, Thatcher told Fowler that she felt he had become known as the "Minister for AIDS", and she disapproved of this. The following year, she moved him to the role of Secretary of State for Employment.

=== Backbenches, retirement and Shadow Cabinet ===
Fowler resigned from the Cabinet in January 1990. He later said that he was the first politician to cite a desire to spend more time with family as the reason for leaving office. The phrase has been reused by many others as a reason for a resignation, and is often treated as insincere or euphemistic, though Fowler has said he was being literal, as he worried he was growing distant from his young children.

Following his resignation from the Government frontbench, Fowler was knighted in 1990.

Fowler then returned twice to front-line politics. First as Chairman of the Conservative Party (though he remained a backbencher in the Commons) from 1992 to 1994, during which time he oversaw the parliamentary boundary changes of the early 1990s. Following the Conservatives' loss to Tony Blair's New Labour, he sat on the Opposition front benches as Shadow Secretary of State for Environment, Transport and the Regions (1997–98) and then as Shadow Home Secretary (1998–99).

In 2001, Fowler stepped down as a Member of Parliament.

== House of Lords ==
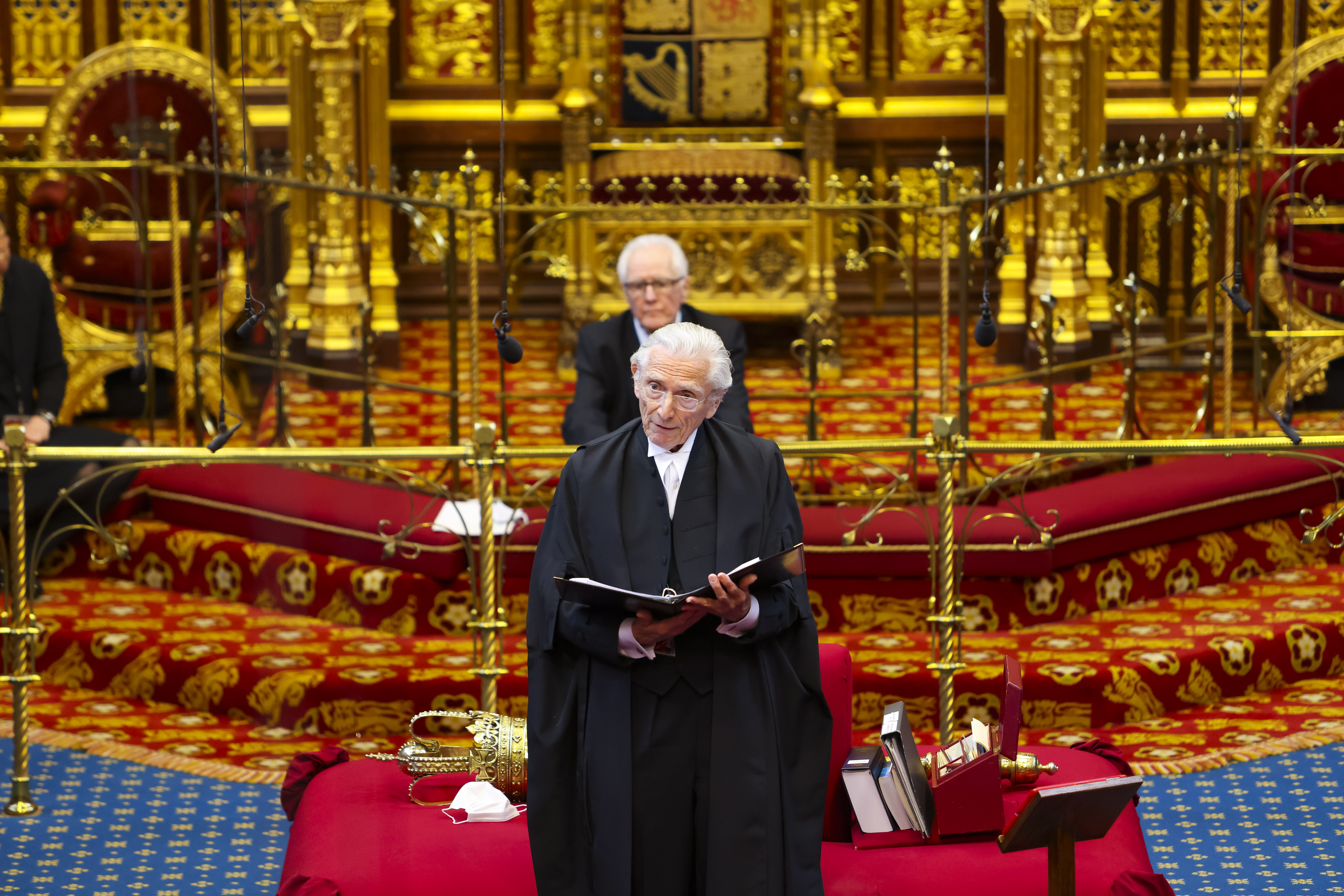
Fowler speaking from the Woolsack in 2021. His deputy and successor, Lord McFall of Alcluith, sits on the steps of the throne behind him.

After standing down from the House of Commons, Fowler entered the House of Lords, sitting on the Conservative benches as Baron Fowler, of Sutton Coldfield, in the County of West Midlands. He had first been offered a peerage in 1989.

In 2003, Fowler proposed that the European Union should appoint a high-level coordinator with ambassadorial rank to deal with the AIDS epidemic.

In 2006, Fowler chaired a House of Lords select committee which criticised the use of the television licence fee, which is used to fund the BBC.

His book A Political Suicide (Politico's Publishing ISBN 978-1-84275-227-2) was published in 2008, and was shortlisted for the Channel 4 Political Book of the Year Award.

In May 2013, Fowler gave his support to legislation aiming to extend marriage rights to same-sex couples, stating: "Parliament should value people equally in the law, and that enabling same-sex couples to marry removes the current inequity."

He was elected as Lord Speaker in 2016. He is the third person and first man to hold the office since it was established by the Constitutional Reform Act 2005. Fowler has stated that he favours reducing the House of Lords to 600 members.

On 19 March 2020, during the COVID-19 pandemic, the 82 year old announced that he would be taking public health advice and withdrawing from Westminster — he would instead be remote working, with deputy speakers taking over his in-person role in the House of Lords chamber. He returned in July 2020 to resume his duties in-person.

On 25 February 2021, some months before his term was to end in September, Fowler announced that he would be stepping down as Lord Speaker in April 2021, ahead of the introduction of a series of structural and organisational changes in the Lords, saying that it would be best for those changes to be "seen through by the team who will be implementing them". He also stated his desire to stand down in order to "speak his mind" as an independent (crossbench) member of the House of Lords on issues he has campaigned for, in particular LGBT rights worldwide and HIV/AIDS.

In March 2021, Fowler backed calls for the UK's first ever national AIDS memorial, supporting its aim of fighting stigma and discrimination against those with HIV and AIDS.

== Private sector ==
Fowler has served on the boards of directors of several companies and is non-executive chairman of Aggregate Industries plc. He is a member of the National Union of Journalists.

== Personal life ==
After a previous marriage ended in divorce, Fowler married Fiona Poole, an economist at the House of Commons Research Service, in 1979. They had two daughters, and Fowler became a stepfather to his wife's son from her prior marriage.

As of 2023, Fowler lives in Fulham, London.

== Bibliography ==
- A Political Suicide: The Conservatives' Voyage into the Wilderness. London: Politicos Publishing. 2008. ISBN 978-1-84275-227-2.
- The Best of Enemies: Diaries 1980–1997. Kingston upon Hull: Biteback Publishing. 2023. ISBN 978-1-78590-815-6.

== Notes ==
Parliament of the United Kingdom
Preceded by George Perry	Member of Parliament for Nottingham South; 1970–1974	Constituency abolished
Preceded by Geoffrey Lloyd	Member of Parliament for Sutton Coldfield; 1974–2001	Succeeded by Andrew Mitchell
Preceded by The Baroness D'Souza	Lord Speaker; 2016–2021	Succeeded by The Lord McFall of Alcluith
Political offices
Preceded by Bill Rodgers as Secretary of State for Transport	Minister of State for Transport; 1979–1981	Succeeded by Himself as Secretary of State for Transport
Preceded by Himself as Minister of State for Transport	Secretary of State for Transport; 1981	Succeeded by David Howell
Preceded by Patrick Jenkin	Secretary of State for Social Services; 1981–1987	Succeeded by John Moore
Preceded by The Lord Young of Graffham	Secretary of State for Employment; 1987–1990	Succeeded by Michael Howard
Preceded by The Lord Young of Graffham	Minister without Portfolio; 1992–1994	Succeeded by Jeremy Hanley
Preceded by John Gummer as Shadow Secretary of State for Environment	Shadow Secretary of State for the Environment, Transport and the Regions; 1997–1998	Succeeded by Gillian Shephard
Preceded by George Young as Shadow Secretary of State for Transport	Shadow Secretary of State for the Environment, Transport and the Regions; 1997–1998	Succeeded by Gillian Shephard
Preceded by Brian Mawhinney	Shadow Home Secretary; 1998–1999	Succeeded by Ann Widdecombe
Party political offices
Preceded by Chris Patten	Chairman of the Conservative Party; 1992–1994	Succeeded by Jeremy Hanley
Orders of precedence in the United Kingdom
Preceded by The Lord Clark of Windermere	Gentlemen; Baron Fowler	Followed by The Lord Campbell-Savours
