= Secretary of State for Social Services =

The secretary of state for social services was a position in the UK cabinet with responsibility for the Department of Health and Social Security between 1968 and 1988. Although the department was titled 'Department of Health and Social Security', the title of the cabinet minister with responsibility for the department was 'secretary of state for social services'.

It was created by an Order in Council which came into operation on 1 November 1968. It transferred the functions of the Minister of Health and the Minister of Social Security to the new Secretary of State, and dissolved those respective ministries.

It continued until 25 July 1988 when the Department of Health and the Department of Social Security were created.

Though when created the position had responsibility for the National Health Service throughout England and Wales, responsibility for the NHS in Wales was transferred to the secretary of state for Wales in 1969.

== Secretaries of state ==
Colour key (for political parties):
Labour Conservative

Secretary of State	Term of office		Political party	Cabinet
Richard Crossman	1 November 1968	19 June 1970	Labour	Wilson II
Keith Joseph	20 June 1970	4 March 1974	Conservative	Heath
Barbara Castle	5 March 1974	8 April 1976	Labour	Wilson III
Barbara Castle	5 March 1974	8 April 1976	Labour	Wilson IV
David Ennals	8 April 1976	4 May 1979	Labour	Callaghan
Patrick Jenkin	5 May 1979	13 September 1981	Conservative	Thatcher I
Norman Fowler	14 September 1981	13 June 1987	Conservative	Thatcher II
John Moore	13 June 1987	24 July 1988	Conservative	Thatcher III
Post split into the Secretary of State for Social Security and the Secretary of State for Health in 1988.
