= List of ministers under Margaret Thatcher =

This article lists government ministers who served under Margaret Thatcher, who was Prime Minister of the United Kingdom from 1979 to 1990, during which time she led a Conservative majority government and was the first woman to hold the office.

== Ministers ==
Note: Prime Minister's row is highlighted in green. Other Cabinet members' rows are highlighted in yellow.

Office	Name	Date
Prime Minister of the United Kingdom	Margaret Thatcher	4 May 1979 – 28 November 1990
First Lord of the Treasury	Margaret Thatcher	4 May 1979 – 28 November 1990
Minister for the Civil Service	Margaret Thatcher	4 May 1979 – 28 November 1990
Minister of State, Civil Service Department	Paul Channon	7 May 1979 – 5 January 1981
Minister of State, Civil Service Department	Barney Hayhoe	5 January 1981 – 12 November 1981
Lord Chancellor	The Lord Hailsham of St Marylebone	5 May 1979
Lord Chancellor	Michael Havers, Baron Havers	13 June 1987
Lord Chancellor	James Mackay, Baron Mackay of Clashfern	26 October 1987
Lord President of the Council	Christopher Soames, Baron Soames	5 May 1979
Lord President of the Council	Francis Pym	14 September 1981
Lord President of the Council	John Biffen	5 April 1982
Lord President of the Council	William Whitelaw, 1st Viscount Whitelaw	11 June 1983
Lord President of the Council	John Wakeham	10 January 1988
Lord President of the Council	Sir Geoffrey Howe	24 July 1989
Lord President of the Council	John MacGregor	2 November 1990
Minister of State for the Privy Council Office	Grey Ruthven, 2nd Earl of Gowrie	11 June 1983 – 11 September 1984
Minister of State for the Privy Council Office	Richard Luce	2 September 1985 – 24 July 1990
Minister of State for the Privy Council Office	David Mellor	24 July 1990 – 28 November 1990
Lord Privy Seal	Sir Ian Gilmour	5 May 1979
Lord Privy Seal	Humphrey Atkins	14 September 1981
Lord Privy Seal	Janet Young, Baroness Young	6 April 1982
Lord Privy Seal	John Biffen	11 June 1983
Lord Privy Seal	John Wakeham	13 June 1987
Lord Privy Seal	John Ganzoni, 2nd Baron Belstead	10 January 1988
Chancellor of the Exchequer	Sir Geoffrey Howe	5 May 1979
Chancellor of the Exchequer	Nigel Lawson	11 June 1983
Chancellor of the Exchequer	John Major	26 October 1989
Chief Secretary to the Treasury	John Biffen	5 May 1979
Chief Secretary to the Treasury	Leon Brittan	5 January 1981
Chief Secretary to the Treasury	Peter Rees	11 June 1983
Chief Secretary to the Treasury	John MacGregor	2 September 1985
Chief Secretary to the Treasury	John Major	13 June 1987
Chief Secretary to the Treasury	Norman Lamont	24 July 1989
Minister of State for Treasury	Peter Rees	6 May 1979 – 14 September 1981
Minister of State for Treasury	Arthur Cockfield, Baron Cockfield	6 May 1979 – 6 April 1982
Minister of State for Treasury	Jock Bruce-Gardyne	15 September 1981 – 11 November 1981
Minister of State for Treasury	Barney Hayhoe	11 November 1981 – 2 September 1985
Minister of State for Treasury	John Wakeham	6 April 1982 – 13 June 1983
Minister of State for Treasury	Ian Gow	2 September 1985 – 19 November 1985
Minister of State for Treasury	Peter Brooke	19 November 1985 – 13 June 1987
Parliamentary Secretary to the Treasury	Michael Jopling	5 May 1979
Parliamentary Secretary to the Treasury	John Wakeham	11 June 1983
Parliamentary Secretary to the Treasury	David Waddington	13 June 1987
Parliamentary Secretary to the Treasury	Timothy Renton	28 October 1989
Financial Secretary to the Treasury	Nigel Lawson	6 May 1979
Financial Secretary to the Treasury	Nicholas Ridley	30 September 1981
Financial Secretary to the Treasury	John Moore	18 October 1983
Financial Secretary to the Treasury	Norman Lamont	21 May 1986
Financial Secretary to the Treasury	Peter Lilley	24 July 1989
Financial Secretary to the Treasury	Francis Maude	14 July 1990
Lords of the Treasury	John MacGregor	7 May 1979 – 5 January 1981
Lords of the Treasury	Peter Morrison	7 May 1979 – 5 January 1981
Lords of the Treasury	Lord James Douglas-Hamilton	7 May 1979 – 1 October 1981
Lords of the Treasury	Carol Mather	7 May 1979 – 1 October 1981
Lords of the Treasury	David Waddington	16 May 1979 – 5 January 1981
Lords of the Treasury	John Wakeham	9 January 1981 – 15 September 1981
Lords of the Treasury	Robert Boscawen	9 January 1981 – 17 February 1983
Lords of the Treasury	John Cope	9 January 1981 – 13 June 1983
Lords of the Treasury	Tony Newton	1 October 1981 – 5 March 1982
Lords of the Treasury	John Gummer	1 October 1981 – 6 January 1983
Lords of the Treasury	Peter Brooke	1 October 1981 – 13 June 1983
Lords of the Treasury	Alastair Goodlad	16 February 1982 – 10 September 1984
Lords of the Treasury	Donald Thompson	14 January 1983 – 10 September 1986
Lords of the Treasury	David Hunt	23 February 1983 – 10 September 1984
Lords of the Treasury	Ian Lang	11 June 1983 – 1 February 1986
Lords of the Treasury	Tristan Garel-Jones	11 June 1983 – 16 October 1986
Lords of the Treasury	John Major	3 October 1984 – 1 November 1985
Lords of the Treasury	Archie Hamilton	3 October 1984 – 10 September 1986
Lords of the Treasury	Tim Sainsbury	7 October 1985 – 23 June 1987
Lords of the Treasury	Michael Neubert	10 February 1986 – 26 July 1988
Lords of the Treasury	Peter Lloyd	16 October 1986 – 24 July 1988
Lords of the Treasury	Mark Lennox-Boyd	16 October 1986 – 25 July 1988
Lords of the Treasury	Tony Durant	16 October 1986 – 19 December 1988
Lords of the Treasury	David Lightbown	26 July 1987 – 24 July 1990
Lords of the Treasury	Alan Howarth	27 July 1988 – 24 July 1989
Lords of the Treasury	David Maclean	27 July 1988 – 24 July 1989
Lords of the Treasury	Kenneth Carlisle	27 July 1988 – 22 July 1990
Lords of the Treasury	Stephen Dorrell	20 December 1988 – 3 May 1990
Lords of the Treasury	David Heathcoat-Amory	26 July 1989 – 28 October 1989
Lords of the Treasury	John Taylor	26 July 1989 – 29 November 1990
Lords of the Treasury	Tom Sackville	30 October 1989 – 28 November 1990
Lords of the Treasury	Michael Fallon	10 May 1990 – 22 July 1990
Lords of the Treasury	Sydney Chapman	25 July 1990 – 28 November 1990
Lords of the Treasury	Greg Knight	25 July 1990 – 28 November 1990
Lords of the Treasury	Irvine Patnick	25 July 1990 – 28 November 1990
Foreign Secretary	Peter Carington, 6th Baron Carrington	5 May 1979
Foreign Secretary	Francis Pym	5 April 1982
Foreign Secretary	Sir Geoffrey Howe	11 June 1983
Foreign Secretary	John Major	14 June 1989
Foreign Secretary	Douglas Hurd	26 October 1989
Minister of State for Foreign and Commonwealth Affairs	Peter Blaker	5 May 1979 – 29 May 1981
Minister of State for Foreign and Commonwealth Affairs	Nicholas Ridley	6 May 1979 – 29 September 1981
Minister of State for Foreign and Commonwealth Affairs	Douglas Hurd	6 May 1979 – 11 June 1983
Minister of State for Foreign and Commonwealth Affairs	Richard Luce	30 September 1981 – 5 April 1982
Minister of State for Foreign and Commonwealth Affairs	Cranley Onslow	5 April 1982 – 13 June 1983
Minister of State for Foreign and Commonwealth Affairs	John Ganzoni, 2nd Baron Belstead	5 April 1982 – 13 June 1983
Minister of State for Foreign and Commonwealth Affairs	Timothy Raison	6 January 1983 – 10 September 1986 (Note: Raison was also Minister of Overseas Development.)
Minister of State for Foreign and Commonwealth Affairs	Richard Luce	11 June 1983 – 2 September 1985
Minister of State for Foreign and Commonwealth Affairs	Malcolm Rifkind	13 June 1983 – 11 January 1986
Minister of State for Foreign and Commonwealth Affairs	Janet Young, Baroness Young	13 June 1983 – 13 June 1987
Minister of State for Foreign and Commonwealth Affairs	Tim Renton	2 September 1985 – 13 June 1987
Minister of State for Foreign and Commonwealth Affairs	Lynda Chalker	11 January 1986 – 28 November 1990 (Note: Chalker was also Minister of Overseas Development from 24 July 1989.)
Minister of State for Foreign and Commonwealth Affairs	Chris Patten	10 September 1986 – 24 July 1989 (Note: Patten was also Minister of Overseas Development.)
Minister of State for Foreign and Commonwealth Affairs	David Mellor	13 June 1987 – 26 July 1988
Minister of State for Foreign and Commonwealth Affairs	Simon Arthur, 4th Baron Glenarthur	13 June 1987 – 24 July 1989
Minister of State for Foreign and Commonwealth Affairs	William Waldegrave	26 July 1988 – 2 November 1990
Minister of State for Foreign and Commonwealth Affairs	Francis Maude	24 July 1989 – 14 July 1990
Minister of State for Foreign and Commonwealth Affairs	Ivon Moore-Brabazon, 3rd Baron Brabazon of Tara	24 July 1989 – 24 July 1990
Minister of State for Foreign and Commonwealth Affairs	Malcolm Sinclair, 20th Earl of Caithness	14 July 1990 – 28 November 1990
Minister of State for Foreign and Commonwealth Affairs	Tristan Garel-Jones	14 July 1990 – 28 November 1990
Minister of State for Foreign and Commonwealth Affairs	Douglas Hogg	2 November 1990 – 28 November 1990
Under-Secretary of State for Foreign and Commonwealth Affairs	Richard Luce	6 May 1979
Under-Secretary of State for Foreign and Commonwealth Affairs	David Trefgarne, 2nd Baron Trefgarne	14 September 1981
Under-Secretary of State for Foreign and Commonwealth Affairs	Malcolm Rifkind	6 April 1982
Under-Secretary of State for Foreign and Commonwealth Affairs	Ray Whitney	13 June 1983
Under-Secretary of State for Foreign and Commonwealth Affairs	Tim Renton	11 September 1984
Under-Secretary of State for Foreign and Commonwealth Affairs	Timothy Eggar	2 September 1985
Under-Secretary of State for Foreign and Commonwealth Affairs	Tim Sainsbury	24 July 1989
Under-Secretary of State for Foreign and Commonwealth Affairs	Mark Lennox-Boyd	24 July 1990
Minister for Overseas Development	Timothy Raison	6 January 1983
Minister for Overseas Development	Chris Patten	10 September 1986 (Note: Patten was also Minister of State for Foreign and Commonwealth Affairs.)
Minister for Overseas Development	Lynda Chalker	24 July 1989 (Note: Chalker was also Minister of State for Foreign and Commonwealth Affairs.)
Home Secretary	William Whitelaw	5 May 1979
Home Secretary	Leon Brittan	11 June 1983
Home Secretary	Douglas Hurd	2 September 1985
Home Secretary	David Waddington	26 October 1989
Minister of State for Home Affairs	Leon Brittan	6 May 1979 – 5 January 1981
Minister of State for Home Affairs	Timothy Raison	6 May 1979 – 6 January 1983
Minister of State for Home Affairs	Patrick Mayhew	5 January 1981 – 13 June 1983
Minister of State for Home Affairs	David Waddington	6 January 1983 – 13 June 1987
Minister of State for Home Affairs	Rodney Elton, 2nd Baron Elton	11 September 1984 – 25 March 1985
Minister of State for Home Affairs	Giles Shaw	11 September 1984 – 10 September 1986
Minister of State for Home Affairs	David Mellor	10 September 1986 – 13 June 1987
Minister of State for Home Affairs	Malcolm Sinclair, 20th Earl of Caithness	10 September 1986 – 10 January 1988
Minister of State for Home Affairs	John Patten	13 June 1987 – 28 November 1990
Minister of State for Home Affairs	Robert Shirley, 13th Earl Ferrers	10 January 1988 – 28 November 1990
Minister of State for Home Affairs	David Mellor	27 October 1989 – 22 June 1990
Minister of State for Home Affairs	Angela Rumbold	23 July 1990 – 28 November 1990
Under-Secretary of State for Home Affairs	John Ganzoni, 2nd Baron Belstead	7 May 1979 – 6 April 1982
Under-Secretary of State for Home Affairs	Rodney Elton, 2nd Baron Elton	6 April 1982 – 11 September 1984
Under-Secretary of State for Home Affairs	David Mellor	6 January 1983 – 10 September 1986
Under-Secretary of State for Home Affairs	Simon Arthur, 4th Baron Glenarthur	27 March 1984 – 10 September 1986
Under-Secretary of State for Home Affairs	Douglas Hogg	10 September 1986 – 26 July 1989
Under-Secretary of State for Home Affairs	Peter Lloyd	25 July 1989 – 28 November 1990
Minister of Agriculture, Fisheries and Food	Peter Walker	5 May 1979
Minister of Agriculture, Fisheries and Food	Michael Jopling	11 June 1983
Minister of Agriculture, Fisheries and Food	John MacGregor	13 June 1987
Minister of Agriculture, Fisheries and Food	John Gummer	24 July 1989
Minister of State for Agriculture, Fisheries and Food	Robert Shirley, 13th Earl Ferrers	7 May 1979 – 13 June 1983
Minister of State for Agriculture, Fisheries and Food	Alick Buchanan-Smith	7 May 1979 – 13 June 1983
Minister of State for Agriculture, Fisheries and Food	John MacGregor	13 June 1983 – 2 September 1985
Minister of State for Agriculture, Fisheries and Food	John Ganzoni, 2nd Baron Belstead	13 June 1983 – 13 June 1987
Minister of State for Agriculture, Fisheries and Food	John Gummer	2 September 1985 – 26 July 1988
Minister of State for Agriculture, Fisheries and Food	Jean Barker, Baroness Trumpington	28 September 1989 – 14 April 1992
Under-Secretary of State for Agriculture, Fisheries and Food	Jerry Wiggin	7 May 1979 – 29 September 1981
Under-Secretary of State for Agriculture, Fisheries and Food	Peggy Fenner	14 September 1981 – 10 September 1986
Under-Secretary of State for Agriculture, Fisheries and Food	Donald Thompson	10 September 1986 – 25 September 1987
Under-Secretary of State for Agriculture, Fisheries and Food	Jean Barker, Baroness Trumpington	13 June 1987 – 28 September 1989
Under-Secretary of State for Agriculture, Fisheries and Food	Richard Ryder	25 July 1988 – 14 July 1989
Under-Secretary of State for Agriculture, Fisheries and Food	David Curry	26 July 1989 – 28 November 1990
Under-Secretary of State for Agriculture, Fisheries and Food	David Maclean	26 July 1989 – 28 November 1990
Minister for the Arts	Norman St John-Stevas	5 May 1979
Minister for the Arts	Paul Channon	5 January 1981
Minister for the Arts	Grey Gowrie	13 June 1983
Minister for the Arts	Richard Luce	2 September 1985
Minister for the Arts	David Mellor	26 July 1990
Secretary of State for Defence	Francis Pym	5 May 1979
Secretary of State for Defence	John Nott	5 January 1981
Secretary of State for Defence	Michael Heseltine	8 January 1983
Secretary of State for Defence	George Younger	9 January 1986
Secretary of State for Defence	Tom King	24 July 1989
Minister of State for Defence	Euan Howard, 4th Baron Strathcona and Mount Royal	6 May 1979 – 5 January 1981
Minister of State for Defence	Thomas Trenchard, 2nd Viscount Trenchard	5 January 1981 – 29 May 1981 (Note: Office abolished on 29 May 1981. Trenchard was appointed Minister of State for Defence Procurement.)
Minister of State for the Armed Forces	Peter Blaker	29 May 1981
Minister of State for the Armed Forces	John Stanley	13 June 1983
Minister of State for the Armed Forces	Ian Stewart	13 June 1987
Minister of State for the Armed Forces	Archie Hamilton	25 July 1988
Minister of State for Defence Procurement	Thomas Trenchard, 2nd Viscount Trenchard	29 May 1981
Minister of State for Defence Procurement	Geoffrey Pattie	6 January 1983
Minister of State for Defence Procurement	Adam Butler	11 September 1984
Minister of State for Defence Procurement	Norman Lamont	2 September 1985
Minister of State for Defence Procurement	David Trefgarne, 2nd Baron Trefgarne	21 May 1986
Minister of State for Defence Procurement	Alan Clark	24 July 1989
Minister of State for Defence Support	David Trefgarne, 2nd Baron Trefgarne	2 September 1985 – 21 May 1986
Under-Secretary of State for the Army	Barney Hayhoe	6 May 1979 – 5 January 1981
Under-Secretary of State for the Army	Philip Goodhart	5 January 1981 – 19 May 1981 (Note: Office abolished on 29 May 1981. Goodhart was appointed Under-Secretary of State for the Armed Forces.)
Under-Secretary of State for the Navy	Keith Speed	6 May 1979 – 18 May 1981 (Note: Office abolished on 29 May 1981.)
Under-Secretary of State for the Air Force	Geoffrey Pattie	6 May 1979 – 29 May 1981 (Note: Office abolished on 29 May 1981. Pattie appointed Under-Secretary of State for Defence Procurement.)
Under-Secretary of State for the Armed Forces	Philip Goodhart	29 May 1981 – 30 September 1981
Under-Secretary of State for the Armed Forces	Jerry Wiggin	15 September 1981 – 11 June 1983
Under-Secretary of State for the Armed Forces	David Trefgarne, 2nd Baron Trefgarne	13 June 1983 – 1 September 1985
Under-Secretary of State for the Armed Forces	Roger Freeman	21 May 1986 – 15 December 1988
Under-Secretary of State for the Armed Forces	Michael Neubert	19 December 1988 – 23 July 1990
Under-Secretary of State for Defence Procurement	Geoffrey Pattie	29 May 1981 – 6 January 1983
Under-Secretary of State for Defence Procurement	Ian Stewart	6 January 1983 – 18 October 1983
Under-Secretary of State for Defence Procurement	John Lee	18 October 1983 – 10 September 1986
Under-Secretary of State for Defence Procurement	Archie Hamilton	10 September 1986 – 13 June 1987
Under-Secretary of State for Defence Procurement	Tim Sainsbury	13 June 1987 – 25 July 1989
Under-Secretary of State for Defence Procurement	Arthur Gore, 9th Earl of Arran	25 July 1989 – 26 July 1990
Under-Secretary of State for Defence Procurement	Kenneth Carlisle	26 July 1990 – 28 November 1990
Secretary of State for Education and Science	Mark Carlisle	5 May 1979
Secretary of State for Education and Science	Sir Keith Joseph	14 September 1981
Secretary of State for Education and Science	Kenneth Baker	21 May 1986
Secretary of State for Education and Science	John MacGregor	24 July 1989
Secretary of State for Education and Science	Kenneth Clarke	2 November 1990
Minister of State, Education and Science	Janet Young, Baroness Young	7 May 1979 – 14 September 1981
Minister of State, Education and Science	Paul Channon	5 January 1981 – 13 June 1983
Minister of State, Education and Science	Chris Patten	5 September 1985 – 10 September 1986
Minister of State, Education and Science	Angela Rumbold	10 September 1986 – 24 July 1990
Minister of State, Education and Science	Tim Eggar	24 July 1990 – 28 November 1990
Under-Secretary of State, Education and Science	Rhodes Boyson	7 May 1979 – 13 June 1983
Under-Secretary of State, Education and Science	Neil Macfarlane	7 May 1979 – 15 September 1981
Under-Secretary of State, Education and Science	William Shelton	15 September 1981 – 13 June 1983
Under-Secretary of State, Education and Science	William Waldegrave	15 September 1981 – 13 June 1983
Under-Secretary of State, Education and Science	Peter Brooke	13 June 1983 – 19 November 1985
Under-Secretary of State, Education and Science	Bob Dunn	13 June 1983 – 26 July 1988
Under-Secretary of State, Education and Science	George Walden	19 November 1985 – 13 June 1987
Under-Secretary of State, Education and Science	Gloria Hooper, Baroness Hooper	13 June 1987 – 26 July 1988
Under-Secretary of State, Education and Science	Robert Jackson	13 June 1987 – 24 July 1990
Under-Secretary of State, Education and Science	John Butcher	26 July 1988 – 24 July 1989
Under-Secretary of State, Education and Science	Alan Howarth	24 July 1989 – 28 November 1990
Under-Secretary of State, Education and Science	Michael Fallon	24 July 1990 – 28 November 1990
Secretary of State for Employment	Jim Prior	5 May 1979
Secretary of State for Employment	Norman Tebbit	14 September 1981
Secretary of State for Employment	Tom King	16 October 1983
Secretary of State for Employment	David Young, Baron Young of Graffham	2 September 1985
Secretary of State for Employment	Norman Fowler	13 June 1987
Secretary of State for Employment	Michael Howard	3 January 1990
Minister of State, Employment	Grey Gowrie	7 May 1979 – 15 September 1981
Minister of State, Employment	Michael Alison	15 September 1981 – 13 June 1983
Minister of State, Employment	Peter Morrison	13 June 1983 – 2 September 1985
Minister of State, Employment	John Gummer	18 October 1985 – 11 September 1984
Minister of State, Employment	Kenneth Clarke	2 September 1985 – 13 June 1987
Minister of State, Employment	John Cope	13 June 1987 – 25 July 1989
Minister of State, Employment	Tim Eggar	25 July 1989 – 23 July 1990
Under-Secretary of State, Employment	Jim Lester	7 May 1979 – 5 January 1981
Under-Secretary of State, Employment	Patrick Mayhew	7 May 1979 – 5 January 1981
Under-Secretary of State, Employment	David Waddington	5 January 1981 – 6 January 1983
Under-Secretary of State, Employment	Peter Morrison	5 January 1981 – 13 June 1983
Under-Secretary of State, Employment	John Gummer	6 January 1983 – 18 October 1983
Under-Secretary of State, Employment	Alan Clark	13 June 1983 – 24 January 1986
Under-Secretary of State, Employment	Peter Bottomley	11 September 1984 – 23 January 1986
Under-Secretary of State, Employment	David Trippier	2 September 1985 – 13 June 1987
Under-Secretary of State, Employment	Ian Lang	31 January 1986 – 10 September 1986
Under-Secretary of State, Employment	John Lee	10 September 1986 – 26 July 1989
Under-Secretary of State, Employment	Patrick Nicholls	13 June 1987 – 28 July 1989
Under-Secretary of State, Employment	Thomas Galbraith, 2nd Baron Strathclyde	26 July 1989 – 24 July 1990
Under-Secretary of State, Employment	Robert Jackson	24 July 1990 – 28 November 1990
Under-Secretary of State, Employment	Eric Forth	24 July 1990 – 14 April 1992
Under-Secretary of State, Employment	Nicholas Lowther, 2nd Viscount Ullswater	24 July 1990 – 16 September 1993
Secretary of State for Energy	David Howell	5 May 1979
Secretary of State for Energy	Nigel Lawson	14 September 1981
Secretary of State for Energy	Peter Walker	11 June 1983
Secretary of State for Energy	Cecil Parkinson	13 June 1987
Secretary of State for Energy	John Wakeham	24 July 1989
Minister of State, Energy	Hamish Gray	7 May 1979 – 13 June 1983
Minister of State, Energy	Alick Buchanan-Smith	13 June 1983 – 13 June 1987
Minister of State, Energy	Peter Morrison	13 June 1987 – 26 July 1990
Under-Secretary of State, Energy	Norman Lamont	7 May 1979 – 5 September 1981
Under-Secretary of State, Energy	John Moore	7 May 1979 – 13 June 1983
Under-Secretary of State, Energy	David Mellor	15 September 1981 – 6 January 1983
Under-Secretary of State, Energy	Nicholas Eden, 2nd Earl of Avon	6 January 1983 – 11 September 1984
Under-Secretary of State, Energy	Giles Shaw	13 June 1983 – 11 September 1984
Under-Secretary of State, Energy	David Hunt	11 September 1984 – 13 June 1987
Under-Secretary of State, Energy	Alastair Goodlad	11 September 1984 – 13 June 1987
Under-Secretary of State, Energy	Michael Spicer	13 June 1987 – 3 January 1990
Under-Secretary of State, Energy	Gloria Hooper, Baroness Hooper	26 July 1988 – 28 July 1989
Under-Secretary of State, Energy	Tony Baldry	3 January 1990 – 28 November 1990
Under-Secretary of State, Energy	Colin Moynihan	24 July 1990 – 28 November 1990
Secretary of State for the Environment	Michael Heseltine	5 May 1979
Secretary of State for the Environment	Tom King	6 January 1983
Secretary of State for the Environment	Patrick Jenkin	11 June 1983
Secretary of State for the Environment	Kenneth Baker	23 September 1985
Secretary of State for the Environment	Nicholas Ridley	21 May 1986
Secretary of State for the Environment	Chris Patten	24 July 1989
Minister of State for Local Government	Tom King	6 May 1979
Minister of State for Local Government	Irwin Bellwin, Baron Bellwin	6 January 1983
Minister of State for Local Government	Kenneth Baker	11 September 1984
Minister of State for Local Government	William Waldegrave	2 September 1985
Minister of State for Local Government	Rhodes Boyson	10 September 1986
Minister of State for Local Government	Michael Howard	13 June 1987
Minister of State for Local Government	John Gummer	25 July 1988
Minister of State for Local Government	David Hunt	25 July 1989
Minister of State for Local Government	Michael Portillo	4 May 1990
Minister of State for Housing	John Stanley	7 May 1979
Minister of State for Housing	Ian Gow	13 June 1983
Minister of State for Housing	John Patten	2 September 1985
Minister of State for Housing	William Waldegrave	13 June 1987
Minister of State for Housing	Malcolm Sinclair, 20th Earl of Caithness	25 July 1988
Minister of State for Housing	Michael Howard	25 July 1989
Minister of State for Housing	Michael Spicer	3 January 1990
Minister of State, Environment	Rodney Elton, 2nd Baron Elton	27 March 1985 – 10 September 1986
Minister of State, Environment	William Waldegrave	10 September 1986 – 13 June 1987
Minister of State, Environment	John Ganzoni, 2nd Baron Belstead	13 June 1987 – 10 January 1988
Minister of State, Environment	Malcolm Sinclair, 20th Earl of Caithness	10 January 1988 – 25 July 1988
Minister of State, Environment	Michael Howard	25 July 1988 – 24 July 1989
Minister of State, Environment	David Trippier	24 July 1989 – 28 November 1990
Under-Secretary of State for Sport	Hector Monro	7 May 1979 – 30 September 1981
Under-Secretary of State for Sport	Neil Macfarlane	15 September 1981 – 2 September 1985
Under-Secretary of State for Sport	Richard Tracey	7 September 1985 – 13 June 1987
Under-Secretary of State for Sport	Colin Moynihan	22 June 1987 – 26 July 1990
Under-Secretary of State for Sport	Robert Atkins	26 July 1990 – 28 November 1990 (Note: Was attached to the Office of Education thereafter.)
Under-Secretary of State, Environment	Marcus Fox	7 May 1979 – 5 January 1981
Under-Secretary of State, Environment	Geoffrey Finsberg	7 May 1979 – 15 September 1981
Under-Secretary of State, Environment	Irwin Bellow, Baron Bellwin	7 May 1979 – 6 January 1983
Under-Secretary of State, Environment	Giles Shaw	5 January 1981 – 13 June 1983
Under-Secretary of State, Environment	Sir George Young	15 September 1981 – 10 September 1986
Under-Secretary of State, Environment	William Waldegrave	13 June 1983 – 2 September 1985
Under-Secretary of State, Environment	Nicholas Eden, 2nd Earl of Avon	11 September 1984 – 27 March 1985
Under-Secretary of State, Environment	Angela Rumbold	2 September 1985 – 10 September 1986
Under-Secretary of State, Environment	Roger Bootle-Wilbraham, 7th Baron Skelmersdale	10 September 1986 – 13 June 1987
Under-Secretary of State, Environment	Christopher Chope	10 September 1986 – 22 July 1990
Under-Secretary of State, Environment	Marion Roe	13 June 1987 – 26 July 1988
Under-Secretary of State, Environment	David Trippier	13 June 1987 – 23 July 1989
Under-Secretary of State, Environment	Virginia Bottomley	25 July 1988 – 28 October 1989
Under-Secretary of State, Environment	Alexander Fermor-Hesketh, 3rd Baron Hesketh	31 January 1989 – 2 November 1990
Under-Secretary of State, Environment	David Heathcoat-Amory	28 October 1989 – 28 November 1990
Under-Secretary of State, Environment	Patrick Nicholls	26 July 1990 – 12 October 1990
Under-Secretary of State, Environment	Thomas Galbraith, 2nd Baron Strathclyde	26 July 1990 – 7 September 1990
Under-Secretary of State, Environment	Emily Blatch, Baroness Blatch	7 September 1990 – 28 November 1990
Under-Secretary of State, Environment	Robert Key	12 October 1990 – 28 November 1990
Secretary of State for Social Services	Patrick Jenkin	5 May 1979
Secretary of State for Social Services	Norman Fowler	14 September 1981
Secretary of State for Social Services	John Moore	13 June 1987
Secretary of State for Health	Kenneth Clarke	25 July 1988
Secretary of State for Health	William Waldegrave	2 November 1990
Minister of State, Health	Gerard Vaughan	7 May 1979
Minister of State, Health	Kenneth Clarke	5 March 1982
Minister of State, Health	Barney Hayhoe	2 September 1985
Minister of State, Health	Tony Newton	10 September 1986
Minister of State, Health	David Mellor	25 July 1988 (Note: Mellor served under a separate Office of Health.)
Minister of State, Health	Anthony Trafford, Baron Trafford	29 July 1989
Minister of State, Health	Virginia Bottomley	28 October 1989
Under-Secretary of State, Health and Social Security	Sir George Young	7 May 1979 – 15 September 1981
Under-Secretary of State, Health and Social Security	Lynda Chalker	7 May 1979 – 5 March 1982
Under-Secretary of State, Health and Social Security	Geoffrey Finsberg	15 September 1981 – 14 June 1983
Under-Secretary of State, Health and Social Security	Rodney Elton, 2nd Baron Elton	15 September 1981 – 6 April 1982
Under-Secretary of State, Health and Social Security	Tony Newton	5 March 1982 – 11 September 1984
Under-Secretary of State, Health and Social Security	David Trefgarne, 2nd Baron Trefgarne	6 April 1982 – 14 June 1983
Under-Secretary of State, Health and Social Security	John Patten	14 June 1983 – 2 September 1985
Under-Secretary of State, Health and Social Security	Simon Arthur, 4th Baron Glenarthur	14 June 1983 – 26 March 1985
Under-Secretary of State, Health and Social Security	Ray Whitney	11 September 1984 – 10 September 1986
Under-Secretary of State, Health and Social Security	Jean Barker, Baroness Trumpington	30 March 1985 – 13 June 1987
Under-Secretary of State, Health and Social Security	John Major	2 September 1985 – 10 September 1986
Under-Secretary of State, Health and Social Security	Nicholas Lyell	10 September 1986 – 13 June 1987
Under-Secretary of State, Health and Social Security	Edwina Currie	10 September 1986 – 25 July 1988
Under-Secretary of State, Health and Social Security	Michael Portillo	13 June 1987 – 25 July 1988
Under-Secretary of State, Health and Social Security	Roger Bootle-Wilbraham, 7th Baron Skelmersdale	13 June 1987 – 25 July 1988
Under-Secretary of State, Health	Edwina Currie	25 July 1988 – 16 December 1988
Under-Secretary of State, Health	Roger Freeman	16 December 1988 – 4 May 1990
Under-Secretary of State, Health	Gloria Hooper, Baroness Hooper	29 September 1989 – 28 November 1990
Under-Secretary of State, Health	Stephen Dorrell	4 May 1990 – 28 November 1990
Secretary of State for Social Security	John Moore	25 July 1988
Secretary of State for Social Security	Tony Newton	23 July 1989
Minister of State, Social Security	Reginald Prentice	7 May 1979 – 5 January 1981
Minister of State, Social Security	Hugh Rossi	5 January 1981 – 12 June 1983
Minister of State, Social Security	Rhodes Boyson	12 June 1983 – 11 September 1984
Minister of State, Social Security	Tony Newton	11 September 1984 – 10 September 1986
Minister of State, Social Security	John Major	10 September 1986 – 13 June 1987
Minister of State, Social Security	Nicholas Scott	13 June 1987 (Note: Scott served under a separate Office of Social Security from 25 July 1988.) – 28 November 1990
Under-Secretary of State, Social Security	Roger Bootle-Wilbraham, 7th Baron Skelmersdale	25 July 1988 – 26 July 1989
Under-Secretary of State, Social Security	Peter Lloyd	25 July 1988 – 28 July 1989
Under-Secretary of State, Social Security	Oliver Eden, 8th Baron Henley	25 July 1989 – 16 September 1993
Under-Secretary of State, Social Security	Gillian Shephard	25 July 1989 – 28 November 1990
Secretary of State for Industry	Sir Keith Joseph	7 May 1979
Secretary of State for Industry	Patrick Jenkin	14 September 1981
Minister of State, Industry	Adam Butler	6 May 1979 – 5 January 1981
Minister of State, Industry	Thomas Trenchard, 2nd Viscount Trenchard	6 May 1979 – 5 January 1981
Minister of State, Industry	Norman Tebbit	5 January 1981 – 14 September 1981
Minister of State, Industry	Norman Lamont	14 September 1981 – 12 June 1983
Minister of State, Industry and Information Technology	Kenneth Baker	5 January 1981 (Note: Baker served under the Office of Trade and Industry from 12 June 1983.)
Minister of State, Industry and Information Technology	Geoffrey Pattie	11 September 1984 (Note: Office abolished on 13 June 1987.)
Under-Secretary of State, Industry	David Mitchell	6 May 1979 – 5 January 1981
Under-Secretary of State, Industry	Michael Marshall	6 May 1979 – 15 September 1981
Under-Secretary of State, Industry	John MacGregor	5 January 1981 – 12 June 1983
Under-Secretary of State, Industry	John Wakeham	15 September 1981 – 6 April 1982
Under-Secretary of State, Industry	John Butcher	6 April 1982 – 12 June 1983
Chancellor of the Duchy of Lancaster	Norman St John-Stevas	5 May 1979
Chancellor of the Duchy of Lancaster	Francis Pym	5 January 1981
Chancellor of the Duchy of Lancaster	Janet Young, Baroness Young	14 September 1981
Chancellor of the Duchy of Lancaster	Cecil Parkinson	6 April 1982
Chancellor of the Duchy of Lancaster	Arthur Cockfield, Baron Cockfield	11 June 1983
Chancellor of the Duchy of Lancaster	Grey Gowrie	11 September 1984
Chancellor of the Duchy of Lancaster	Norman Tebbit	3 September 1985
Chancellor of the Duchy of Lancaster	Kenneth Clarke	13 June 1987
Chancellor of the Duchy of Lancaster	Tony Newton	25 July 1988
Chancellor of the Duchy of Lancaster	Kenneth Baker	24 July 1989
Secretary of State for Northern Ireland	Humphrey Atkins	5 May 1979
Secretary of State for Northern Ireland	James Prior	14 September 1981
Secretary of State for Northern Ireland	Douglas Hurd	11 September 1984
Secretary of State for Northern Ireland	Tom King	3 September 1985
Secretary of State for Northern Ireland	Peter Brooke	24 July 1989
Minister of State, Northern Ireland	Michael Alison	7 May 1979 – 15 September 1981
Minister of State, Northern Ireland	Hugh Rossi	7 May 1979 – 5 January 1981
Minister of State, Northern Ireland	Adam Butler	5 January 1981 – 11 September 1984
Minister of State, Northern Ireland	Grey Gowrie	15 September 1981 – 10 June 1983
Minister of State, Northern Ireland	William Murray, 8th Earl of Mansfield	13 June 1983 – 12 April 1984
Minister of State, Northern Ireland	Rhodes Boyson	11 September 1984 – 10 September 1986
Minister of State, Northern Ireland	Nicholas Scott	10 September 1986 – 13 June 1987
Minister of State, Northern Ireland	John Stanley	13 June 1987 – 25 July 1988
Minister of State, Northern Ireland	Ian Stewart	25 July 1988 – 25 July 1989
Minister of State, Northern Ireland	John Cope	25 July 1989 – 28 November 1990
Under-Secretary of State, Northern Ireland	Rodney Elton, 2nd Baron Elton	7 May 1979 – 15 September 1981
Under-Secretary of State, Northern Ireland	Philip Goodhart	7 May 1979 – 5 January 1981
Under-Secretary of State, Northern Ireland	Giles Shaw	7 May 1979 – 5 January 1981
Under-Secretary of State, Northern Ireland	David Mitchell	5 January 1981 – 13 June 1983
Under-Secretary of State, Northern Ireland	John Patten	5 January 1981 – 13 June 1983
Under-Secretary of State, Northern Ireland	Nicholas Scott	15 September 1981 – 11 September 1986
Under-Secretary of State, Northern Ireland	Chris Patten	14 June 1983 – 2 September 1985
Under-Secretary of State, Northern Ireland	Charles Lyell, 3rd Baron Lyell	12 April 1984 – 25 July 1989
Under-Secretary of State, Northern Ireland	Richard Needham, 6th Earl of Kilmorey	3 September 1985 – 28 November 1990
Under-Secretary of State, Northern Ireland	Peter Viggers	10 September 1986 – 26 July 1989
Under-Secretary of State, Northern Ireland	Brian Mawhinney	10 September 1986 – 28 November 1990
Under-Secretary of State, Northern Ireland	Peter Bottomley	4 July 1989 – 28 July 1990
Under-Secretary of State, Northern Ireland	Roger Bootle-Wilbraham, 7th Baron Skelmersdale	24 July 1989 – 28 November 1990
Paymaster General	Angus Maude	5 May 1979
Paymaster General	Francis Pym	5 January 1981
Paymaster General	Cecil Parkinson	14 September 1981
Paymaster General	vacant	11 June 1983
Paymaster General	John Gummer	11 September 1984
Paymaster General	Kenneth Clarke	2 September 1985
Paymaster General	Peter Brooke	13 June 1987
Paymaster General	The Earl of Caithness	24 July 1989
Paymaster General	Richard Ryder	14 July 1990
Minister without Portfolio	David Young, Baron Young of Graffham	11 September 1984 – 3 September 1985
Secretary of State for Scotland	George Younger	5 May 1979
Secretary of State for Scotland	Malcolm Rifkind	11 January 1986
Secretary of State for Scotland	Ian Lang	28 November 1990
Secretary of State for Scotland	Michael Forsyth	5 July 1995
Minister of State for Scotland	William Murray, 8th Earl of Mansfield	7 May 1979 – 13 June 1983
Minister of State for Scotland	Hamish Gray, Baron Gray of Contin	13 June 1983 – 11 September 1986
Minister of State for Scotland	Simon Arthur, 4th Baron Glenarthur	10 September 1986 – 13 June 1987
Minister of State for Scotland	Ian Lang	13 June 1987 – 28 November 1990
Minister of State for Scotland	Charles Sanderson, Baron Sanderson of Bowden	13 June 1987 – 7 September 1990
Minister of State for Scotland	Michael Forsyth	7 September 1990 – 28 November 1990
Under-Secretary of State for Scotland	Alexander Fletcher	7 May 1979 – 14 June 1983
Under-Secretary of State for Scotland	Russell Fairgrieve	7 May 1979 – 15 September 1981
Under-Secretary of State for Scotland	Malcolm Rifkind	7 May 1979 – 6 April 1982
Under-Secretary of State for Scotland	Allan Stewart	15 September 1981 – 10 September 1986
Under-Secretary of State for Scotland	John MacKay	6 April 1982 – 14 June 1987
Under-Secretary of State for Scotland	Michael Ancram, Earl of Ancram	13 June 1983 – 14 June 1987
Under-Secretary of State for Scotland	Ian Lang	10 September 1986 – 13 June 1987
Under-Secretary of State for Scotland	Lord James Douglas-Hamilton	13 June 1987 – 28 November 1990
Under-Secretary of State for Scotland	Michael Forsyth	13 June 1987 – 7 September 1990
Under-Secretary of State for Scotland	Thomas Galbraith, 2nd Baron Strathclyde	7 September 1990 – 28 November 1990
Secretary of State for Trade	John Nott	5 May 1979
Secretary of State for Trade	John Biffen	5 January 1981
Secretary of State for Trade	Arthur Cockfield, Baron Cockfield	6 April 1982
Minister for Consumer Affairs	Sally Oppenheim-Barnes	5 May 1979
Minister for Consumer Affairs	Gerald Vaughan	5 March 1982
Minister for Consumer Affairs	vacant	13 June 1983 (Note: Role assigned under the Office of Trade and Industry.)
Minister for Trade	Cecil Parkinson	7 May 1979
Minister for Trade	Peter Rees	14 September 1981
Minister for Trade	Paul Channon	13 June 1983 (Note: Channon served under the Office of Trade and Industry.)
Minister for Trade	Alan Clark	24 January 1986
Minister for Trade	David Trefgarne, 2nd Baron Trefgarne	25 July 1989
Minister for Trade	Tim Sainsbury	23 July 1990
Under-Secretary of State for Trade	Norman Tebbit	5 May 1979 – 5 January 1981
Under-Secretary of State for Trade	Reginald Eyre	7 May 1979 – 5 March 1982
Under-Secretary of State for Trade	David Trefgarne, 2nd Baron Trefgarne	5 January 1981 – 15 September 1981
Under-Secretary of State for Trade	Iain Sproat	15 September 1981 – 12 June 1983
Secretary of State for Trade and Industry	Cecil Parkinson	12 June 1983
Secretary of State for Trade and Industry	Norman Tebbit	16 October 1983
Secretary of State for Trade and Industry	Leon Brittan	2 September 1985
Secretary of State for Trade and Industry	Paul Channon	24 January 1986
Secretary of State for Trade and Industry	David Young, Baron Young of Graffham	13 June 1987
Secretary of State for Trade and Industry	Nicholas Ridley	24 July 1989
Secretary of State for Trade and Industry	Peter Lilley	14 July 1990
Minister for Industry	Douglas Hogg	24 July 1989
Minister for Industry	Alexander Fermor-Hesketh, 3rd Baron Hesketh	2 November 1990
Minister for Corporate Affairs	John Redwood	2 November 1990
Minister of State for Trade and Industry	Norman Lamont	13 June 1983 – 2 September 1985
Minister of State for Trade and Industry	Peter Morrison	2 September 1985 – 10 September 1986
Minister of State for Trade and Industry	Giles Shaw	10 September 1986 – 13 June 1987
Under-Secretary of State for Trade and Industry	John Butcher	14 June 1983 – 26 July 1988
Under-Secretary of State for Trade and Industry	Alexander Fletcher	14 June 1983 – 2 September 1985
Under-Secretary of State for Trade and Industry	David Trippier	14 June 1983 – 2 September 1985
Under-Secretary of State for Trade and Industry	Michael Lucas, 2nd Baron Lucas of Chilworth	11 September 1984 – 13 June 1987
Under-Secretary of State for Trade and Industry	Michael Howard	2 September 1985 – 13 June 1987
Under-Secretary of State for Trade and Industry	Robert Atkins	13 June 1987 – 26 July 1989
Under-Secretary of State for Trade and Industry	Francis Maude	13 June 1987 – 26 July 1989
Under-Secretary of State for Trade and Industry	Eric Forth	26 July 1988 – 24 July 1990
Under-Secretary of State for Trade and Industry	John Redwood	26 July 1989 – 2 November 1990
Under-Secretary of State for Trade and Industry	Edward Leigh	2 November 1990 – 28 November 1990
Minister of Transport	Norman Fowler	11 May 1979 – 5 January 1981 (Note: Fowler then became Secretary of State for Transport.)
Secretary of State for Transport	Norman Fowler	5 January 1981
Secretary of State for Transport	David Howell	14 September 1981
Secretary of State for Transport	Tom King	11 June 1983
Secretary of State for Transport	Nicholas Ridley	16 October 1983
Secretary of State for Transport	John Moore	21 May 1986
Secretary of State for Transport	Paul Channon	13 June 1987
Secretary of State for Transport	Cecil Parkinson	24 July 1989
Minister of State, Transport	Lynda Chalker	18 October 1983 – 10 January 1986
Minister of State, Transport	David Mitchell	23 January 1986 – 25 July 1988
Minister of State, Transport	Michael Portillo	25 July 1988 – 4 May 1990
Minister of State, Transport	Roger Freeman	4 May 1990 – 28 November 1990
Minister of State, Transport	Ivon Moore-Brabazon, 3rd Baron Brabazon of Tara	23 July 1990 – 28 November 1990
Parliamentary Secretary for Transport	Kenneth Clarke	7 May 1979 – 5 January 1981 (Note: Clarke then became Under-Secretary of State for Transport.)
Under-Secretary of State for Transport	Kenneth Clarke	5 January 1981 – 5 March 1982
Under-Secretary of State for Transport	Lynda Chalker	5 March 1982 – 18 October 1983
Under-Secretary of State for Transport	Reginald Eyre	5 March 1982 – 11 June 1983
Under-Secretary of State for Transport	David Mitchell	11 June 1983 – 23 January 1986
Under-Secretary of State for Transport	Michael Spicer	11 September 1984 – 13 June 1987
Under-Secretary of State for Transport	Malcolm Sinclair, 20th Earl of Caithness	2 September 1985 – 10 September 1986
Under-Secretary of State for Transport	Peter Bottomley	23 January 1986 – 24 July 1989
Under-Secretary of State for Transport	Ivon Moore-Brabazon, 3rd Baron Brabazon of Tara	10 September 1986 – 23 July 1989
Under-Secretary of State for Transport	Robert Atkins	25 July 1989 – 22 July 1990
Under-Secretary of State for Transport	Patrick McLoughlin	25 July 1989 – 28 November 1990
Under-Secretary of State for Transport	Christopher Chope	23 July 1990 – 28 November 1990
Secretary of State for Wales	Nicholas Edwards	5 May 1979
Secretary of State for Wales	Peter Walker	13 June 1987
Secretary of State for Wales	David Hunt	4 May 1990
Minister of State for Wales	John Stradling Thomas	17 February 1983 – 2 September 1985
Minister of State for Wales	Wyn Roberts	15 June 1987 – 28 November 1990
Under-Secretary of State for Wales	Michael Roberts	7 May 1979 – 6 January 1983
Under-Secretary of State for Wales	Wyn Roberts	7 May 1979 – 13 June 1987
Under-Secretary of State for Wales	Mark Robinson	3 October 1985 – 15 June 1987
Under-Secretary of State for Wales	Ian Grist	15 June 1987 – 28 November 1990
Attorney General	Michael Havers	5 May 1979
Attorney General	Sir Patrick Mayhew	11 June 1987
Solicitor General	Sir Ian Percival	5 May 1979
Solicitor General	Sir Patrick Mayhew	13 June 1983
Solicitor General	Sir Nicholas Lyell	13 June 1987
Lord Advocate	James Mackay, Baron Mackay of Clashfern	5 May 1979
Lord Advocate	Kenneth Cameron, Baron Cameron of Lochbroom	16 May 1984
Lord Advocate	Peter Fraser, Baron Fraser of Carmyllie	4 January 1989
Solicitor General for Scotland	Nicholas Fairbairn	7 May 1979
Solicitor General for Scotland	Peter Fraser	28 January 1982
Solicitor General for Scotland	Alan Rodger (Note: Rodger was not a Member of the House of Commons.)	14 January 1989
Treasurer of the Household	John Stradling Thomas	6 May 1979
Treasurer of the Household	Anthony Berry	17 February 1983
Treasurer of the Household	John Cope	11 June 1983
Treasurer of the Household	David Hunt	15 June 1987
Treasurer of the Household	Tristan Garel-Jones	25 July 1989
Treasurer of the Household	Alastair Goodlad	22 July 1990
Comptroller of the Household	Spencer Le Marchant	7 May 1979
Comptroller of the Household	Anthony Berry	30 September 1981
Comptroller of the Household	Carol Mather	17 February 1983
Comptroller of the Household	Robert Boscawen	16 October 1986
Comptroller of the Household	Tristan Garel-Jones	26 July 1988
Comptroller of the Household	Alastair Goodlad	25 July 1989
Comptroller of the Household	Sir George Young	23 July 1990
Vice-Chamberlain of the Household	Anthony Berry	7 May 1979
Vice-Chamberlain of the Household	Carol Mather	30 September 1981
Vice-Chamberlain of the Household	Robert Boscawen	17 February 1983
Vice-Chamberlain of the Household	Tristan Garel-Jones	16 October 1986
Vice-Chamberlain of the Household	Michael Neubert	26 July 1988
Vice-Chamberlain of the Household	Tony Durant	20 December 1988
Vice-Chamberlain of the Household	David Lightbown	25 July 1990
Captain of the Gentlemen-at-Arms	Bertram Bowyer, 2nd Baron Denham	6 May 1979
Captain of the Yeomen of the Guard	Richard Hill, 7th Baron Sandys	6 May 1979
Captain of the Yeomen of the Guard	David Cunliffe-Lister, 2nd Earl of Swinton	20 October 1982
Captain of the Yeomen of the Guard	Andrew Davidson, 2nd Viscount Davidson	10 September 1986
Lords-in-Waiting	Richard Long, 4th Viscount Long	9 May 1979 – 2 May 1997
Lords-in-Waiting	Charles Stourton, 26th Baron Mowbray	9 May 1979 – 22 September 1980
Lords-in-Waiting	Charles Lyell, 3rd Baron Lyell	9 May 1979 – 12 April 1984
Lords-in-Waiting	Edmund Cokayne, 2nd Baron Cullen of Ashbourne	9 May 1979 – 27 May 1982
Lords-in-Waiting	David Trefgarne, 2nd Baron Trefgarne	9 May 1979 – 5 January 1981
Lords-in-Waiting	Nicholas Eden, 2nd Earl of Avon	22 September 1980 – 6 January 1983
Lords-in-Waiting	Roger Bootle-Wilbraham, 7th Baron Skelmersdale	9 January 1981 – 10 September 1986
Lords-in-Waiting	Simon Arthur, 4th Baron Glenarthur	27 May 1982 – 10 June 1983
Lords-in-Waiting	Michael Lucas, 2nd Baron Lucas of Chilworth	6 January 1983 – 9 September 1984
Lords-in-Waiting	James Mackay, Baron Mackay of Clashfern	11 June 1983 – 25 March 1985
Lords-in-Waiting	Malcolm Sinclair, 20th Earl of Caithness	8 May 1984 – 2 September 1985
Lords-in-Waiting	Ivon Moore-Brabazon, 3rd Baron Brabazon of Tara	19 September 1984 – 10 September 1986
Lords-in-Waiting	Caroline Cox, Baroness Cox	3 April 1985 – 2 August 1985
Lords-in-Waiting	Andrew Davidson, 2nd Viscount Davidson	17 September 1985 – 10 September 1986
Lords-in-Waiting	Gloria Hooper, Baroness Hooper	17 September 1985 – 14 June 1987
Lords-in-Waiting	Alexander Fermor-Hesketh, 3rd Baron Hesketh	10 September 1986 – 31 January 1987
Lords-in-Waiting	Maxwell Aitken, 3rd Baron Beaverbrook	10 September 1986 – 28 July 1988
Lords-in-Waiting	Alexander Scrymgeour, 12th Earl of Dundee	3 October 1986 – 26 July 1989
Lords-in-Waiting	Arthur Gore, 9th Earl of Arran	18 June 1987 – 24 July 1989
Lords-in-Waiting	Thomas Galbraith, 2nd Baron Strathclyde	12 August 1988 – 24 July 1989
Lords-in-Waiting	Oliver Eden, 8th Baron Henley	13 February 1989 – 24 July 1989
Lords-in-Waiting	Nicholas Lowther, 2nd Viscount Ullswater	26 July 1989 – 22 July 1990
Lords-in-Waiting	Hugh Mackay, 14th Lord Reay	2 August 1989 – 28 November 1990
Lords-in-Waiting	Michael Bowes-Lyon, 18th Earl of Strathmore and Kinghorne	2 August 1989 – 28 November 1990
Lords-in-Waiting	Emily Blatch, Baroness Blatch	15 January 1990 – 7 September 1990
Lords-in-Waiting	Hugh Cavendish, Baron Cavendish of Furness	14 September 1990 – 28 November 1990
Lords-in-Waiting	William Astor, 4th Viscount Astor	11 October 1990 – 28 November 1990

== Cabinets ==
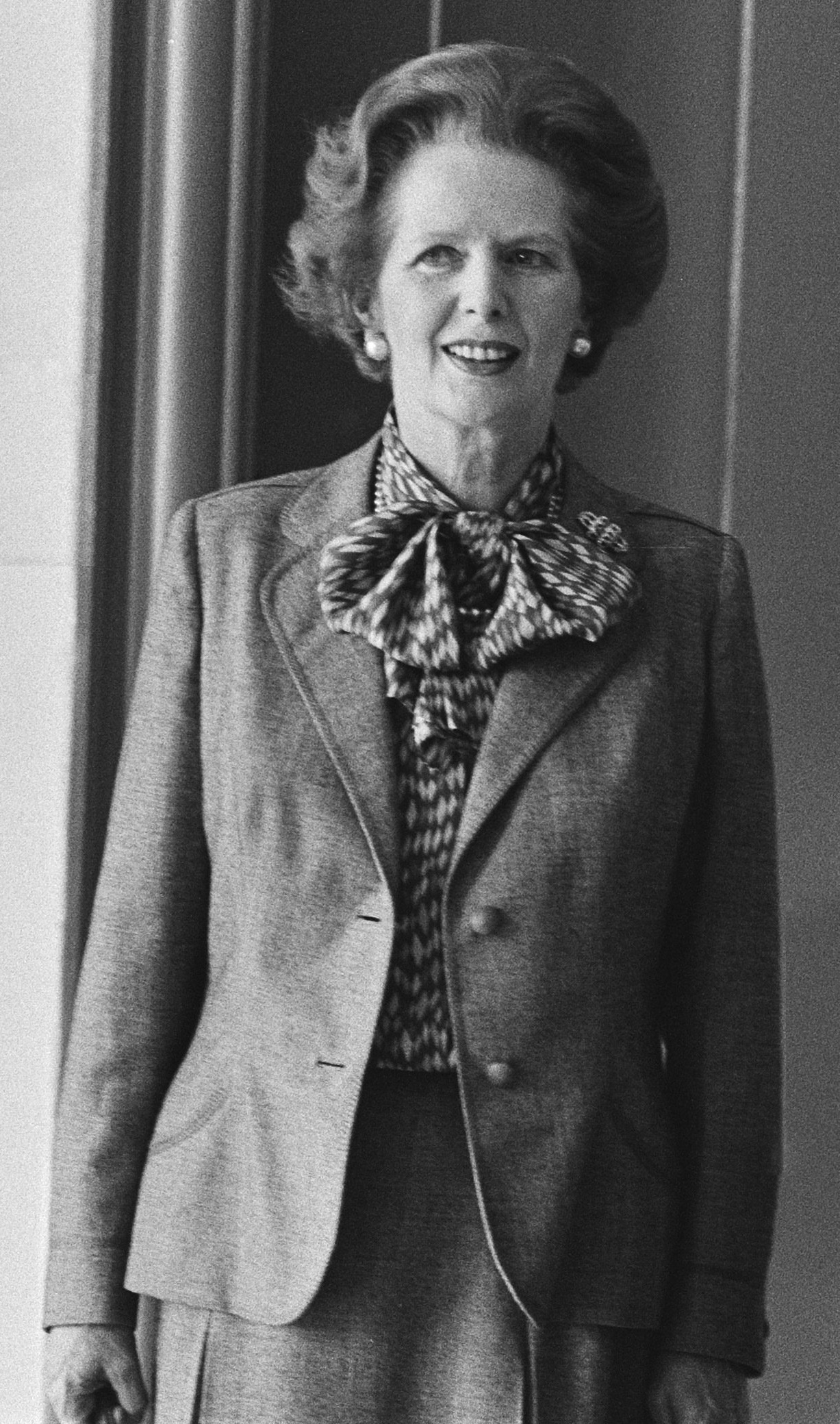
Margaret Thatcher, Prime Minister of the United Kingdom (1979–1990)

=== May 1979 to September 1981 ===
- Margaret Thatcher – Prime Minister
- William Whitelaw – Home Secretary and Deputy Prime Minister
- Christopher Soames, Baron Soames – Leader of the House of Lords and Lord President of the Council
- Quintin Hogg, Baron Hailsham of St Marylebone – Lord High Chancellor of Great Britain
- Sir Geoffrey Howe – Chancellor of the Exchequer
- Peter Carington, 6th Baron Carrington – Foreign Secretary
- Sir Ian Gilmour, 3rd Baronet – Lord Keeper of the Privy Seal
- John Biffen – Chief Secretary to the Treasury
- Peter Walker – Minister of Agriculture, Fisheries and Food
- Norman St John-Stevas – Leader of the House of Commons and Minister of State for the Arts and Chancellor of the Duchy of Lancaster
- Francis Pym – Secretary of State for Defence
- Mark Carlisle – Secretary of State for Education
- James Prior – Secretary of State for Employment
- David Howell – Secretary of State for Energy
- Michael Heseltine – Secretary of State for the Environment
- Patrick Jenkin – Secretary of State for Social Services
- Keith Joseph – Secretary of State for Industry
- Humphrey Atkins – Secretary of State for Northern Ireland
- Angus Maude – Paymaster General
- George Younger – Secretary of State for Scotland
- John Nott – Secretary of State for Trade and President of the Board of Trade
- Nicholas Edwards – Secretary of State for Wales

==== Changes ====
- January 1981 –
  - Francis Pym succeeded Norman St John-Stevas as Chancellor of the Duchy of Lancaster and Leader of the House of Commons. Pym succeeded Angus Maude as Paymaster-General.
  - John Nott succeeded Francis Pym as Secretary of State for Defence. John Biffen succeeded Nott as Secretary of State for Trade and President of the Board of Trade.
  - Leon Brittan succeeded John Biffen as Chief Secretary to the Treasury.
  - Norman St John-Stevas resigned as Minister for the Arts. His successor was not in the Cabinet.
  - the post of Secretary of State for Transport was brought into the Cabinet and Norman Fowler was given the post.

=== September 1981 to June 1983 ===
In September 1981, a substantial reshuffle took place.

- Margaret Thatcher – Prime Minister
- William Whitelaw – Home Secretary and Deputy Prime Minister
- Francis Pym – Leader of the House of Commons and Lord President of the Council
- Quintin Hogg, Baron Hailsham of St Marylebone – Lord High Chancellor of Great Britain
- Sir Geoffrey Howe – Chancellor of the Exchequer
- Peter Carrington, 6th Baron Carrington – Foreign Secretary
- Humphrey Atkins – Lord Keeper of the Privy Seal
- Leon Brittan – Chief Secretary to the Treasury
- Peter Walker – Minister of Agriculture, Fisheries and Food
- John Nott – Secretary of State for Defence
- Keith Joseph – Secretary of State for Education
- Norman Tebbit – Secretary of State for Employment
- Nigel Lawson – Secretary of State for Energy
- Michael Heseltine – Secretary of State for the Environment
- Norman Fowler – Secretary of State for Social Services
- Patrick Jenkin – Secretary of State for Industry
- Janet Young, Baroness Young – Leader of the House of Lords and Chancellor of the Duchy of Lancaster
- James Prior – Secretary of State for Northern Ireland
- Cecil Parkinson – Paymaster General
- George Younger – Secretary of State for Scotland
- John Biffen – Secretary of State for Trade and President of the Board of Trade
- David Howell – Secretary of State for Transport
- Nicholas Edwards – Secretary of State for Wales

==== Changes ====
- April 1982 –
  - Francis Pym succeeded Lord Carrington as Foreign Secretary. John Biffen succeeded Pym as Lord President of the Council.
  - Baroness Young succeeded Humphrey Atkins as Lord Keeper of the Privy Seal. Cecil Parkinson succeeded Young as Chancellor of the Duchy of Lancaster.
  - Lord Cockfield succeeded John Biffen as Secretary of State for Trade.
- January 1983 – Michael Heseltine succeeded John Nott as Secretary of State for Defence. Tom King succeeded Heseltine as Secretary of State for the Environment.

=== June 1983 to June 1987 ===
- Margaret Thatcher – Prime Minister
- William Whitelaw – Leader of the House of Lords and Lord President of the Council
- Quintin Hogg, Baron Hailsham of St Marylebone – Lord High Chancellor of Great Britain
- John Biffen – Leader of the House of Commons and Lord Keeper of the Privy Seal
- Nigel Lawson – Chancellor of the Exchequer
- Peter Rees – Chief Secretary to the Treasury
- Sir Geoffrey Howe – Foreign Secretary
- Leon Brittan – Home Secretary
- Michael Jopling – Minister of Agriculture, Fisheries and Food
- Michael Heseltine – Secretary of State for Defence
- Sir Keith Joseph – Secretary of State for Education
- Norman Tebbit – Secretary of State for Employment
- Peter Walker – Secretary of State for Energy
- Patrick Jenkin – Secretary of State for the Environment
- Norman Fowler – Secretary of State for Health
- Arthur Cockfield, Baron Cockfield – Chancellor of the Duchy of Lancaster
- Jim Prior – Secretary of State for Northern Ireland
- George Younger – Secretary of State for Scotland
- Cecil Parkinson – Secretary of State for Trade and Industry and President of the Board of Trade
- Tom King – Secretary of State for Transport
- Nicholas Edwards – Secretary of State for Wales
- John Wakeham – Chief Whip of the House of Commons and Parliamentary Secretary to the Treasury

==== Changes ====
- October 1983 –
  - Tom King succeeded Norman Tebbit as Secretary of State for Employment.
  - Norman Tebbit succeeded Cecil Parkinson as Secretary of State for Trade and Industry.
  - Nicholas Ridley succeeded Tom King as Secretary of State for Transport.
- September 1984 –
  - Grey Gowrie succeeded Lord Cockfield as Chancellor of the Duchy of Lancaster.
  - Douglas Hurd succeeded Jim Prior as Secretary of State for Northern Ireland.
  - David Young, Baron Young of Graffham enters the Cabinet as Minister without Portfolio.
- September 1985 –
  - Lord Young of Graffham succeeded Tom King as Secretary of State for Employment.
  - Kenneth Baker succeeded Patrick Jenkin as Secretary of State for the Environment.
  - Norman Tebbit succeeded Earl of Gowrie as Chancellor of the Duchy of Lancaster.
  - Tom King succeeded Douglas Hurd as Secretary of State for Northern Ireland.
  - Kenneth Clarke enters the Cabinet as Paymaster-General.
  - Leon Brittan succeeded Norman Tebbit as Secretary of State for Trade and Industry.
  - John MacGregor succeeded Peter Rees as Chief Secretary to the Treasury.
  - Douglas Hurd succeeded Leon Brittan as Home Secretary.
- early January 1986 – Malcolm Rifkind succeeded George Younger as Secretary of State for Scotland. Younger succeeded Michael Heseltine as Secretary of State for Defence.
- late January 1986 – Paul Channon succeeded Leon Brittan as Secretary of State for Trade and Industry.
- May 1986 –
  - Nicholas Ridley succeeded Kenneth Baker as Secretary of State for the Environment. John Moore succeeded Ridley as Secretary of State for Transport.
  - Kenneth Baker succeeded Keith Joseph as Secretary of State for Education and Science.

=== June 1987 to July 1989 ===
- Margaret Thatcher – Prime Minister
- William Whitelaw – Deputy Prime Minister and Leader of the House of Lords and Lord President of the Council
- Michael Havers, Baron Havers – Lord High Chancellor of Great Britain
- John Wakeham – Leader of the House of Commons and Lord Keeper of the Privy Seal
- Nigel Lawson – Chancellor of the Exchequer
- John Major – Chief Secretary to the Treasury
- Geoffrey Howe – Foreign Secretary
- Douglas Hurd – Home Secretary
- John MacGregor – Minister of Agriculture, Fisheries and Food
- George Younger – Secretary of State for Defence
- Kenneth Baker – Secretary of State for Education
- Norman Fowler – Secretary of State for Employment
- Cecil Parkinson – Secretary of State for Energy
- Nicholas Ridley – Secretary of State for the Environment
- John Moore – Secretary of State for Health
- David Young, Baron Young of Graffham – Secretary of State for Trade and Industry and President of the Board of Trade
- Kenneth Clarke – Chancellor of the Duchy of Lancaster
- Tom King – Secretary of State for Northern Ireland
- Malcolm Rifkind – Secretary of State for Scotland
- Paul Channon – Secretary of State for Transport
- Peter Walker – Secretary of State for Wales
- David Waddington – Chief Whip of the House of Commons and Parliamentary Secretary to the Treasury
- Sir Patrick Mayhew – Attorney General for England and Wales

==== Changes ====
- October 1987 – Lord Mackay of Clashfern succeeds Lord Havers as Lord High Chancellor of Great Britain.
- January 1988 – Viscount Whitelaw retires and is succeeded by John Wakeham as Lord President of the Council. Lord Belstead succeeds Wakeham as Lord Keeper of the Privy Seal. Lord Belstead succeeds Viscount Whitelaw as Leader of the House of Lords.
- July 1988 – Department of Health and Social Security broken up into component parts:
  - John Moore continues on as Secretary of State for Social Security.
  - Kenneth Clarke becomes Secretary of State for Health. Tony Newton succeeds Clarke as Chancellor of the Duchy of Lancaster.

=== July 1989 to November 1990 ===
- Margaret Thatcher – Prime Minister
- Sir Geoffrey Howe – Deputy Prime Minister and Leader of the House of Commons and Lord President of the Council
- James Mackay, Baron Mackay of Clashfern – Lord High Chancellor of Great Britain
- John Ganzoni, 2nd Baron Belstead – Leader of the House of Lords and Lord Keeper of the Privy Seal
- Nigel Lawson – Chancellor of the Exchequer
- Norman Lamont – Chief Secretary to the Treasury
- John Major – Foreign Secretary
- Douglas Hurd – Home Secretary
- John Gummer – Minister of Agriculture, Fisheries and Food
- Tom King – Secretary of State for Defence
- John MacGregor – Secretary of State for Education
- Norman Fowler – Secretary of State for Employment
- John Wakeham – Secretary of State for Energy
- Chris Patten – Secretary of State for the Environment
- Kenneth Clarke – Secretary of State for Health
- Kenneth Baker – Chancellor of the Duchy of Lancaster
- Peter Brooke – Secretary of State for Northern Ireland
- Malcolm Rifkind – Secretary of State for Scotland
- Tony Newton – Secretary of State for Social Security
- Nicholas Ridley – Secretary of State for Trade and Industry and President of the Board of Trade
- Cecil Parkinson – Secretary of State for Transport
- Peter Walker – Secretary of State for Wales

==== Changes ====
- October 1989 –
  - John Major succeeds Nigel Lawson as Chancellor of the Exchequer.
  - Douglas Hurd succeeds John Major as Foreign Secretary.
  - David Waddington succeeds Douglas Hurd as Home Secretary.
  - Tim Renton succeeds David Waddington as Chief Whip.
- January 1990 – Norman Fowler resigns as Secretary of State for Employment and is succeeded by Michael Howard.
- May 1990 – Peter Walker resigns as Secretary of State for Wales, having announced his intention in March. David Hunt succeeds him.
- July 1990 – Nicholas Ridley resigns as Secretary of State for Trade and Industry. Peter Lilley succeeds him.
- November 1990 – At the start of the month, Geoffrey Howe resigns and the title of Deputy Prime Minister is not reallocated. John MacGregor succeeds him as Lord President of the Council and is in turn succeeded by Kenneth Clarke as Secretary of State for Education and Science, who is succeeded by William Waldegrave as Secretary of State for Health.
