= Third Thatcher ministry =

Government of the United Kingdom from 1987 to 1990

- Cabinet of the United Kingdom
- 1987–1990
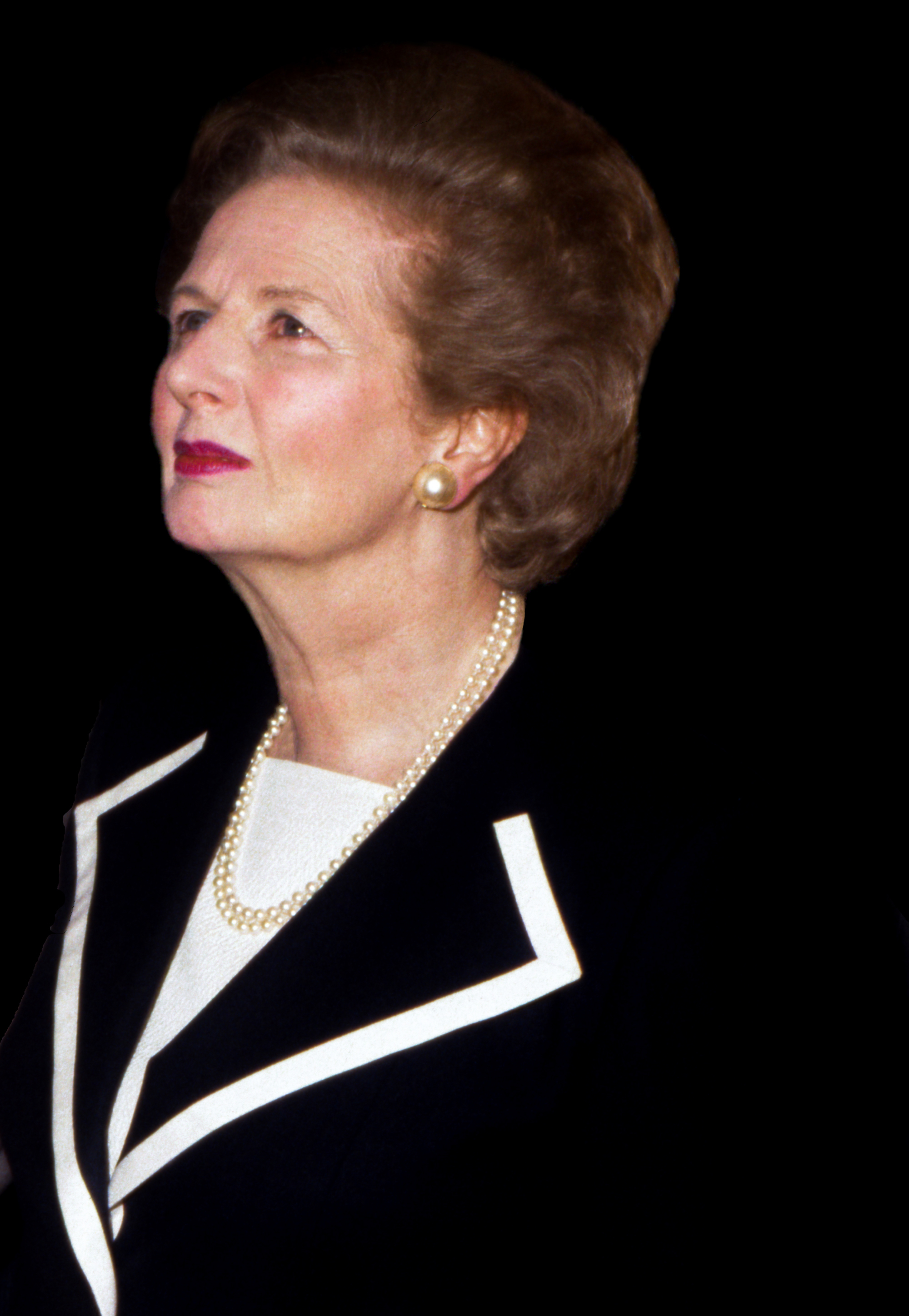
- Thatcher in 1990
- Date formed: 12 June 1987
- Date dissolved: 28 November 1990

People and organisations
- Monarch: Elizabeth II
- Prime Minister: Margaret Thatcher
- Prime Minister's history: Premiership of Margaret Thatcher
- Deputy Prime Minister: Geoffrey Howe (1989–1990)
- Total no. of members: 245 appointments
- Member party: Conservative Party
- Status in legislature: Majority
- Opposition cabinet: Kinnock shadow cabinet
- Opposition party: Labour Party
- Opposition leader: Neil Kinnock

History
- Outgoing formation: 1990 Conservative leadership election
- Election: 1987 general election
- Legislature terms: 50th UK Parliament
- Budgets: 1988 budget; 1989 budget; 1990 budget
- Predecessor: Second Thatcher ministry
- Successor: First Major ministry

Margaret Thatcher was Prime Minister of the United Kingdom from 4 May 1979 to 28 November 1990, during which time she led a Conservative majority government. She was the first woman to hold that office. During her premiership, Thatcher moved to liberalise the British economy through deregulation, privatisation, and the promotion of entrepreneurialism.

This article details the third Thatcher ministry which she led at the invitation of Queen Elizabeth II from 1987 to 1990.

== Election ==
The Conservatives were elected for a third successive term in June 1987, with a majority of 102 seats. It enabled Margaret Thatcher to become the longest-serving prime minister of the 20th century, as Britain's economic recovery continued.

== Section 28 ==
In October 1987, Thatcher during her speech at Conservative Party Conference said, "Children who need to be taught to respect traditional moral values are being taught that they have an inalienable right to be gay. All of those children are being cheated of a sound start in life."

In May 1988, Margaret Thatcher's Conservative government introduced Section 28. The law stopped councils and schools "promoting the teaching of the acceptability of homosexuality as a pretended family relationship." The law also effectively encouraged overt discrimination against LGBT people in the UK.

== Fate ==
Then, on 1 November 1990, came the first of a series of events which would spell the end of Margaret Thatcher's years in power. Geoffrey Howe, the Deputy Prime Minister, long resentful of being ousted as Foreign Secretary, resigned from the cabinet over its European policy. Soon afterward, in his resignation speech in the House of Commons, he publicly denounced Thatcher, having once been one of her closest allies, personally and for her hostility towards the programmes of the European Economic Community. On 14 November, former cabinet minister Michael Heseltine challenged Thatcher's leadership. Thatcher polled higher than him in the first round of the leadership contest, but failed to gain an outright victory in the first round of voting.

Within minutes of the result being announced, Thatcher informed reporters that she intended to let her name go forward for the second ballot. However, on 22 November, before a second round of the contest could take place, Thatcher announced her resignation as prime minister and Leader of the Conservative Party after more than 11 years, explaining that she was resigning to make way for a leader more likely to win the next general election.

Her successor was the Chancellor of the Exchequer, John Major, who was elected on 27 November 1990, and who at 47 became the youngest Conservative Prime Minister of the 20th century.

== Cabinets ==
=== June 1987 to July 1989 ===
Office	Name
Prime Minister; First Lord of the Treasury; Minister for the Civil Service	Margaret Thatcher
Deputy Prime Minister; Leader of the House of Lords; Lord President of the Council	William Whitelaw
Lord High Chancellor of Great Britain	Michael Havers, Baron Havers
Leader of the House of Commons; Lord Keeper of the Privy Seal	John Wakeham
Chancellor of the Exchequer	Nigel Lawson
Chief Secretary to the Treasury	John Major
Secretary of State for Foreign and Commonwealth Affairs	Geoffrey Howe
Secretary of State for the Home Department	Douglas Hurd
Minister of Agriculture, Fisheries and Food	John MacGregor
Secretary of State for Defence	George Younger
Secretary of State for Education and Science	Kenneth Baker
Secretary of State for Employment	Norman Fowler
Secretary of State for Energy	Cecil Parkinson
Secretary of State for the Environment	Nicholas Ridley
Secretary of State for Health	John Moore
Secretary of State for Trade and Industry; President of the Board of Trade	David Young, Baron Young of Graffham
Chancellor of the Duchy of Lancaster	Kenneth Clarke
Secretary of State for Transport	Paul Channon
Secretary of State for Northern Ireland	Tom King
Secretary of State for Scotland	Malcolm Rifkind
Secretary of State for Wales	Peter Walker
Chief Whip of the House of Commons; Parliamentary Secretary to the Treasury	David Waddington
Attorney General for England and Wales	Patrick Mayhew

==== Changes ====
- October 1987 – Lord Mackay of Clashfern succeeds Lord Havers as Lord High Chancellor of Great Britain
- January 1988 – Viscount Whitelaw retires and is succeeded by John Wakeham as Lord President of the Council. Lord Belstead succeeds Wakeham as Lord Keeper of the Privy Seal. Lord Belstead succeeds Viscount Whitelaw as Leader of the House of Lords
- July 1988 – Department of Health and Social Security broken up into component parts:
  - John Moore continues on as Secretary of State for Social Security
  - Kenneth Clarke becomes Secretary of State for Health
- Tony Newton succeeds Clarke as Chancellor of the Duchy of Lancaster

=== July 1989 to November 1990 ===
Office	Name
Prime Minister; First Lord of the Treasury; Minister for the Civil Service	Margaret Thatcher
Deputy Prime Minister; Leader of the House of Commons; Lord President of the Council	Geoffrey Howe
Lord High Chancellor of Great Britain	James Mackay, Baron Mackay of Clashfern
Leader of the House of Lords; Lord Keeper of the Privy Seal	John Ganzoni, 2nd Baron Belstead
Chancellor of the Exchequer	Nigel Lawson
Chief Secretary to the Treasury	Norman Lamont
Secretary of State for Foreign and Commonwealth Affairs	John Major
Secretary of State for the Home Department	Douglas Hurd
Minister of Agriculture, Fisheries and Food	John Gummer
Secretary of State for Defence	Tom King
Secretary of State for Education and Science	John MacGregor
Secretary of State for Employment	Norman Fowler
Secretary of State for Energy	John Wakeham
Secretary of State for the Environment	Chris Patten
Secretary of State for Health	Kenneth Clarke
Chancellor of the Duchy of Lancaster	Kenneth Baker
Secretary of State for Social Security	Tony Newton
Secretary of State for Trade and Industry; President of the Board of Trade	Nicholas Ridley
Secretary of State for Transport	Cecil Parkinson
Secretary of State for Northern Ireland	Peter Brooke
Secretary of State for Scotland	Malcolm Rifkind
Secretary of State for Wales	Peter Walker

==== Changes ====
- October 1989 –
  - John Major succeeds Nigel Lawson as Chancellor of the Exchequer
  - Douglas Hurd succeeds John Major as Foreign Secretary
  - David Waddington succeeds Douglas Hurd as Home Secretary
  - Tim Renton succeeds David Waddington as Chief Whip
- January 1990 – Norman Fowler resigns as Secretary of State for Employment and is succeeded by Michael Howard
- May 1990 – Peter Walker resigns as Secretary of State for Wales, having announced his intention in March. David Hunt succeeds him
- July 1990 – Nicholas Ridley resigns as Secretary of State for Trade and Industry. Peter Lilley succeeds him
- November 1990 – At the start of the month, Geoffrey Howe resigns and the title of Deputy Prime Minister is not reallocated. John MacGregor succeeds him as Lord President of the Council and is in turn succeeded by Kenneth Clarke as Secretary of State for Education and Science, who is succeeded by William Waldegrave as Secretary of State for Health

== List of ministers ==
Members of the Cabinet are in bold face

Office	Name	Dates	Notes
Prime Minister; First Lord of the Treasury; Minister for the Civil Service	**Margaret Thatcher**	June 1987 – 28 November 1990	
Deputy Prime Minister	**William Whitelaw**	June 1987 – January 1988	also Leader of the House of Lords and Lord President of the Council
Lord High Chancellor of Great Britain	**Michael Havers**	13 June 1987	
Lord High Chancellor of Great Britain	**James Mackay**	26 October 1987	
Leader of the House of Commons	**John Wakeham**	13 June 1987	also Lord Privy Seal from June 1987 – January 1988, Lord President of the Council from January 1988 – July 1989
Leader of the House of Commons	**Geoffrey Howe**	24 July 1989	also Lord President of the Council
Leader of the House of Commons	**John MacGregor**	2 November 1990	also Lord President of the Council
Leader of the House of Lords	**William Whitelaw**	June 1987	also Lord President of the Council
Leader of the House of Lords	**John Ganzoni**	January 1988	also Lord Privy Seal
Lord President of the Council	**Willie Whitelaw**	June 1987	also Deputy Leader of the Conservative Party and Leader of the House of Lords
Lord President of the Council	**John Wakeham**	10 January 1988	also Leader of the House of Commons
Lord President of the Council	**Geoffrey Howe**	24 July 1989	also Deputy Prime Minister and Leader of the House of Commons
Lord President of the Council	**John MacGregor**	2 November 1990	also Leader of the House of Commons
Minister of State for the Privy Council Office	Richard Luce	June 1987 – 24 July 1990	
Minister of State for the Privy Council Office	David Mellor	24 July 1990 – 28 November 1990	
Lord Keeper of the Privy Seal	**John Wakeham**	13 June 1987	also Leader of the House of Commons
Lord Keeper of the Privy Seal	**John Ganzoni**	10 January 1988	also Leader of the House of Lords
Chancellor of the Exchequer	**Nigel Lawson**	June 1987	
Chancellor of the Exchequer	**John Major**	26 October 1989	
Chief Secretary to the Treasury	**John Major**	13 June 1987	
Chief Secretary to the Treasury	**Norman Lamont**	24 July 1989	
Parliamentary Secretary to the Treasury	David Waddington	13 June 1987	
Parliamentary Secretary to the Treasury	Tim Renton	28 October 1989	
Financial Secretary to the Treasury	Norman Lamont	June 1987	
Financial Secretary to the Treasury	Peter Lilley	24 July 1989	
Financial Secretary to the Treasury	Francis Maude	23 July 1990	
Economic Secretary to the Treasury	Peter Lilley	June 1987	
Economic Secretary to the Treasury	Richard Ryder	25 July 1989	
Economic Secretary to the Treasury	John Maples	23 July 1990	
Lords Commissioners of the Treasury	Michael Neubert	June 1987 – 26 July 1988	
Lords Commissioners of the Treasury	Peter Lloyd	June 1987 – 24 July 1988	
Lords Commissioners of the Treasury	Mark Lennox-Boyd	June 1987 – 25 July 1988	
Lords Commissioners of the Treasury	Tony Durant	June 1987 – 19 December 1988	
Lords Commissioners of the Treasury	David Lightbown	26 July 1987 – 24 July 1990	
Lords Commissioners of the Treasury	Alan Howarth	27 July 1988 – 24 July 1989	
Lords Commissioners of the Treasury	David Maclean	27 July 1988 – 24 July 1989	
Lords Commissioners of the Treasury	Kenneth Carlisle	27 July 1988 – 22 July 1990	
Lords Commissioners of the Treasury	Stephen Dorrell	20 December 1988 – 3 May 1990	
Lords Commissioners of the Treasury	David Heathcoat-Amory	26 July 1989 – 28 October 1989	
Lords Commissioners of the Treasury	John Taylor	26 July 1989 – 29 November 1990	
Lords Commissioners of the Treasury	Tom Sackville	30 October 1989 – November 1990	
Lords Commissioners of the Treasury	Michael Fallon	10 May 1990 – 22 July 1990	
Lords Commissioners of the Treasury	Sydney Chapman	25 July 1990 – November 1990	
Lords Commissioners of the Treasury	Greg Knight	25 July 1990 – November 1990	
Lords Commissioners of the Treasury	Irvine Patnick	25 July 1990 – November 1990	
Assistant Whips	Richard Ryder	June 1987 – July 1988	
Assistant Whips	Kenneth Carlisle	June 1987 – July 1988	
Assistant Whips	Stephen Dorrell	June 1987 – December 1988	
Assistant Whips	Alan Howarth	June 1987 – July 1988	
Assistant Whips	David Maclean	June 1987 – July 1988	
Assistant Whips	Tom Sackville	July 1988 – October 1989	
Assistant Whips	John Taylor	July 1988 – July 1989	
Assistant Whips	Michael Fallon	July 1988 – May 1990	
Assistant Whips	David Heathcoat-Amory	July 1988 – July 1989	
Assistant Whips	Sydney Chapman	December 1988 – July 1990	
Assistant Whips	Greg Knight	July 1989 – July 1990	
Assistant Whips	Irvine Patnick	July 1989 – July 1990	
Assistant Whips	Nicholas Baker	November 1989 -November 1990	
Assistant Whips	Timothy Wood	May 1990 – November 1990	
Assistant Whips	Timothy Kirkhope	July 1990 – November 1990	
Assistant Whips	Tim Boswell	July 1990 – November 1990	
Assistant Whips	Neil Hamilton	July 1990 – November 1990	
Foreign Secretary	**Geoffrey Howe**	June 1987	
Foreign Secretary	**John Major**	14 June 1989	
Foreign Secretary	**Douglas Hurd**	26 October 1989	
Minister of State for Foreign and Commonwealth Affairs	Lynda Chalker	June 1987 – November 1990	also Minister of Overseas Development from 24 July 1989
Minister of State for Foreign and Commonwealth Affairs	Chris Patten	June 1987 – 24 July 1989	also Minister of Overseas Development
Minister of State for Foreign and Commonwealth Affairs	David Mellor	13 June 1987 – 26 July 1988	
Minister of State for Foreign and Commonwealth Affairs	Simon Arthur	13 June 1987 – 24 July 1989	
Minister of State for Foreign and Commonwealth Affairs	William Waldegrave	26 July 1988 – 2 November 1990	
Minister of State for Foreign and Commonwealth Affairs	Francis Maude	24 July 1989 – 14 July 1990	
Minister of State for Foreign and Commonwealth Affairs	Ivon Moore-Brabazon	24 July 1989 – 24 July 1990	
Minister of State for Foreign and Commonwealth Affairs	Malcolm Sinclair	14 July 1990 – November 1990	
Minister of State for Foreign and Commonwealth Affairs	Tristan Garel-Jones	14 July 1990 – November 1990	
Minister of State for Foreign and Commonwealth Affairs	Douglas Hogg	2 November 1990 – November 1990	
Under-Secretary of State for Foreign and Commonwealth Affairs	Timothy Eggar	June 1987	
Under-Secretary of State for Foreign and Commonwealth Affairs	Tim Sainsbury	24 July 1989	
Under-Secretary of State for Foreign and Commonwealth Affairs	Mark Lennox-Boyd	24 July 1990	
Minister for Overseas Development	Chris Patten	June 1987	also Minister of State for Foreign and Commonwealth Affairs
Minister for Overseas Development	Lynda Chalker	24 July 1989	also Minister of State for Foreign and Commonwealth Affairs
Home Secretary	**Douglas Hurd**	June 1987	
Home Secretary	**David Waddington**	26 October 1989	
Minister of State for Home Affairs	Malcolm Sinclair	June 1987 – 10 January 1988	
Minister of State for Home Affairs	Tim Renton	15 June 1987 – October 1989	
Minister of State for Home Affairs	John Patten	13 June 1987 – November 1990	
Minister of State for Home Affairs	Robert Shirley	10 January 1988 – November 1990	
Minister of State for Home Affairs	David Mellor	27 October 1989 – 22 July 1990	
Minister of State for Home Affairs	Angela Rumbold	23 July 1990 – November 1990	
Under-Secretary of State for Home Affairs	Douglas Hogg	June 1987 – 26 July 1989	
Under-Secretary of State for Home Affairs	Peter Lloyd	25 July 1989 – November 1990	
Minister of Agriculture, Fisheries and Food	**John MacGregor**	13 June 1987	
Minister of Agriculture, Fisheries and Food	**John Gummer**	24 July 1989	
Minister of State for Agriculture, Fisheries and Food	John Gummer	June 1987 – 26 July 1988	
Minister of State for Agriculture, Fisheries and Food	Baroness Trumpington	28 September 1989 – November 1990	
Under-Secretary of State for Agriculture, Fisheries and Food	Donald Thompson	June 1987 – 25 July 1989	
Under-Secretary of State for Agriculture, Fisheries and Food	Baroness Trumpington	13 June 1987 – 28 September 1989	
Under-Secretary of State for Agriculture, Fisheries and Food	Richard Ryder	25 July 1988 – 14 July 1989	
Under-Secretary of State for Agriculture, Fisheries and Food	David Curry	26 July 1989 – November 1990	
Under-Secretary of State for Agriculture, Fisheries and Food	David Maclean	26 July 1989 – November 1990	
Minister for the Arts	Richard Luce	June 1987	
Minister for the Arts	David Mellor	26 July 1990	
Secretary of State for Defence	**George Younger**	June 1987	
Secretary of State for Defence	**Tom King**	24 July 1989	
Minister of State for the Armed Forces	Ian Stewart	13 June 1987	
Minister of State for the Armed Forces	Archie Hamilton	25 July 1988	
Minister of State for Defence Procurement	David Trefgarne	June 1987	
Minister of State for Defence Procurement	Alan Clark	24 July 1989	
Under-Secretary of State for the Armed Forces	Roger Freeman	June 1987 – 15 December 1988	
Under-Secretary of State for the Armed Forces	Michael Neubert	19 December 1988 – 23 July 1990	
Under-Secretary of State for Defence Procurement	Tim Sainsbury	13 June 1987 – 25 July 1989	
Under-Secretary of State for Defence Procurement	Arthur Gore	25 July 1989 – 26 July 1990	
Under-Secretary of State for Defence Procurement	Kenneth Carlisle	26 July 1990 – 28 November 1990	
Secretary of State for Education	**Kenneth Baker**	June 1987	
Secretary of State for Education	**John MacGregor**	24 July 1989	
Secretary of State for Education	**Kenneth Clarke**	2 November 1990	
Minister of State, Education and Science	Angela Rumbold	June 1987 – 24 July 1990	
Minister of State, Education and Science	Tim Eggar	24 July 1990	
Under-Secretary of State, Education and Science	Bob Dunn	June 1987 – 26 July 1988	
Under-Secretary of State, Education and Science	Gloria Hooper	13 June 1987 – 26 July 1988	
Under-Secretary of State, Education and Science	Robert Jackson	13 June 1987 – 24 July 1990	
Under-Secretary of State, Education and Science	John Butcher	26 July 1988 – 24 July 1989	
Under-Secretary of State, Education and Science	Alan Howarth	24 July 1989 – November 1990	
Under-Secretary of State, Education and Science	Michael Fallon	24 July 1990 – November 1990	
Secretary of State for Employment	**Norman Fowler**	13 June 1987	
Secretary of State for Employment	**Michael Howard**	3 January 1990	
Minister of State, Employment	John Cope	13 June 1987 – 25 July 1989	
Minister of State, Employment	Timothy Eggar	25 July 1989 – 23 July 1990	
Under-Secretary of State, Employment	John Lee	June 1987 – 26 July 1989	
Under-Secretary of State, Employment	Patrick Nicholls	13 June 1987 – 24 July 1990	
Under-Secretary of State, Employment	Thomas Galbraith	26 July 1989 – 24 July 1990	
Under-Secretary of State, Employment	Robert Jackson	24 July 1990 – November 1990	
Under-Secretary of State, Employment	Eric Forth	24 July 1990 – November 1990	
Under-Secretary of State, Employment	Nicholas Lowther	24 July 1990 – November 1990	
Secretary of State for Energy	**Cecil Parkinson**	13 June 1987	
Secretary of State for Energy	**John Wakeham**	24 July 1989	
Minister of State, Energy	Peter Morrison	13 June 1987 – 26 July 1990	
Under-Secretary of State, Energy	Michael Spicer	13 June 1987 – 3 January 1990	
Under-Secretary of State, Energy	Gloria Hooper	26 July 1988 – 28 July 1989	
Under-Secretary of State, Energy	Tony Baldry	3 January 1990 – 28 November 1990	
Under-Secretary of State, Energy	Colin Moynihan	24 July 1990 – November 1990	
Secretary of State for the Environment	**Nicholas Ridley**	June 1987	
Secretary of State for the Environment	**Chris Patten**	24 July 1989	
Minister of State for Local Government	Michael Howard	13 June 1987	
Minister of State for Local Government	John Gummer	25 July 1988	
Minister of State for Local Government	David Hunt	25 July 1989	
Minister of State for Local Government	Michael Portillo	4 May 1990	
Minister of State for Housing	William Waldegrave	13 June 1987	
Minister of State for Housing	Malcolm Sinclair	25 July 1988	
Minister of State for Housing	Michael Howard	25 July 1989	
Minister of State for Housing	Michael Spicer	3 January 1990	
Minister of State, Environment	John Ganzoni	13 June 1987 – 10 January 1988	
Minister of State, Environment	Malcolm Sinclair	10 January 1988 – 25 July 1988	
Minister of State, Environment	Michael Howard	25 July 1988 – 24 July 1989	
Minister of State, Environment	David Trippier	24 July 1989 – 28 November 1990	
Under-Secretary of State for Sport	Colin Moynihan	22 June 1987 – 26 July 1990	
Under-Secretary of State for Sport	Robert Atkins	26 July 1990 – 28 November 1990	
Under-Secretary of State, Environment	Christopher Chope	June 1987 – 22 July 1990	
Under-Secretary of State, Environment	Marion Roe	13 June 1987 – 26 July 1988	
Under-Secretary of State, Environment	David Trippier	13 June 1987 – 23 July 1989	
Under-Secretary of State, Environment	Virginia Bottomley	25 July 1988 – 28 October 1989	
Under-Secretary of State, Environment	Alexander Fermor-Hesketh	31 January 1989 – 2 November 1990	
Under-Secretary of State, Environment	David Heathcoat-Amory	28 October 1989 – 28 November 1990	
Under-Secretary of State, Environment	Patrick Nicholls	26 July 1990 – 12 October 1990	
Under-Secretary of State, Environment	Thomas Galbraith	26 July 1990 – 7 September 1990	
Under-Secretary of State, Environment	Emily Blatch	7 September 1990 – November 1990	
Under-Secretary of State, Environment	Robert Key	12 October 1990 – November 1990	
Secretary of State for Social Services	**John Moore**	13 June 1987	Reorganised into Office of Health and Office of Social Security 25 July 1988
Secretary of State for Health	**Kenneth Clarke**	25 July 1988	
Secretary of State for Health	**William Waldegrave**	2 November 1990	
Minister of State, Health	Tony Newton	June 1987	
Minister of State, Health	David Mellor	25 July 1988	under separate Office of Health
Minister of State, Health	Anthony Trafford	29 July 1989 – September 1989	
Minister of State, Health	Virginia Bottomley	28 October 1989	
Under-Secretary of State, Health and Social Security	Edwina Currie	June 1987 – 25 July 1988	
Under-Secretary of State, Health and Social Security	Michael Portillo	13 June 1987 – 25 July 1988	
Under-Secretary of State, Health and Social Security	Roger Bootle-Wilbraham	13 June 1987 – 25 July 1988	
Under-Secretary of State, Health	Edwina Currie	25 July 1988 – 16 December 1988	
Under-Secretary of State, Health	Roger Freeman	16 December 1988 – 4 May 1990	
Under-Secretary of State, Health	Gloria Hooper	29 September 1989 – November 1990	
Under-Secretary of State, Health	Stephen Dorrell	4 May 1990 – November 1990	
Secretary of State for Social Security	**John Moore**	25 July 1988	
Secretary of State for Social Security	**Tony Newton**	23 July 1989	
Minister of State, Social Security	Nicholas Scott	13 June 1987	under separate Office of Social Security 25 July 1988
Under-Secretary of State, Social Security	Roger Bootle-Wilbraham	25 July 1988 – 26 July 1989	
Under-Secretary of State, Social Security	Peter Lloyd	25 July 1988 – 28 July 1989	
Under-Secretary of State, Social Security	Oliver Eden	25 July 1989 – November 1990	
Under-Secretary of State, Social Security	Gillian Shephard	25 July 1989 – 28 November 1990	
Chancellor of the Duchy of Lancaster	**Kenneth Clarke**	13 June 1987	
Chancellor of the Duchy of Lancaster	**Tony Newton**	25 July 1988	
Chancellor of the Duchy of Lancaster	**Kenneth Baker**	24 July 1989	also Chairman of the Conservative Party
Secretary of State for Northern Ireland	**Tom King**	June 1987	
Secretary of State for Northern Ireland	**Peter Brooke**	24 July 1989	
Minister of State, Northern Ireland	John Stanley	13 June 1987 – 25 July 1988	
Minister of State, Northern Ireland	Ian Stewart	25 July 1988 – 25 July 1989	
Minister of State, Northern Ireland	John Cope	25 July 1989 – 28 November 1990	
Under-Secretary of State, Northern Ireland	Charles Lyell	June 1987 – 25 July 1989	
Under-Secretary of State, Northern Ireland	Richard Needham	June 1987 – April 1992	
Under-Secretary of State, Northern Ireland	Peter Viggers	June 1987 – 26 July 1989	
Under-Secretary of State, Northern Ireland	Brian Mawhinney	June 1987 – 28 November 1990	
Under-Secretary of State, Northern Ireland	Peter Bottomley	4 July 1989 – 28 July 1990	
Under-Secretary of State, Northern Ireland	Roger Bootle-Wilbraham	24 July 1989 – 28 November 1990	
Paymaster General	Peter Brooke	13 June 1987	also Chairman of the Conservative Party
Paymaster General	Malcolm Sinclair	24 July 1989	
Paymaster General	Richard Ryder	14 July 1990	
Secretary of State for Scotland	**Malcolm Rifkind**	June 1987	
Minister of State for Scotland	Ian Lang	13 June 1987 – 28 November 1990	
Minister of State for Scotland	Charles Sanderson	13 June 1987 – 7 September 1990	
Minister of State for Scotland	Michael Forsyth	7 September 1990 – November 1990	
Under-Secretary of State for Scotland	Lord James Douglas-Hamilton	13 June 1987 – 6 July 1995	
Under-Secretary of State for Scotland	Michael Forsyth	13 June 1987 – 7 September 1990	
Under-Secretary of State for Scotland	Thomas Galbraith	7 September 1990 – November 1990	
Minister for Trade	Alan Clark	June 1987	
Minister for Trade	David Trefgarne	25 July 1989	
Minister for Trade	Tim Sainsbury	23 July 1990	
Secretary of State for Trade and Industry	**David Young**	13 June 1987	
Secretary of State for Trade and Industry	**Nicholas Ridley**	24 July 1989	
Secretary of State for Trade and Industry	**Peter Lilley**	14 July 1990	
Minister for Industry	Douglas Hogg	24 July 1989	
Minister for Industry	Alexander Fermor-Hesketh	2 November 1990	
Minister for Corporate Affairs	John Redwood	2 November 1990	
Under-Secretary of State for Trade and Industry	John Butcher	June 1987 – 26 July 1988	
Under-Secretary of State for Trade and Industry	Robert Atkins	13 June 1987 – 26 July 1989	
Under-Secretary of State for Trade and Industry	Francis Maude	13 June 1987 – 26 July 1989	
Under-Secretary of State for Trade and Industry	Eric Forth	26 July 1988 – 24 July 1990	
Under-Secretary of State for Trade and Industry	John Redwood	26 July 1989 – 2 November 1990	
Under-Secretary of State for Trade and Industry	Edward Leigh	2 November 1990 – November 1990	
Secretary of State for Transport	**Paul Channon**	13 June 1987	
Secretary of State for Transport	**Cecil Parkinson**	24 July 1989	
Minister of State, Transport	David Mitchell	June 1987 – 25 July 1988	
Minister of State, Transport	Michael Portillo	25 July 1988 – 4 May 1990	
Minister of State, Transport	Roger Freeman	4 May 1990 – 28 November 1990	
Minister of State, Transport	Ivon Moore-Brabazon	23 July 1990 – November 1990	
Under-Secretary of State for Transport	Peter Bottomley	June 1987 – 24 July 1989	
Under-Secretary of State for Transport	Ivon Moore-Brabazon	June 1987 – 23 July 1989	
Under-Secretary of State for Transport	Robert Atkins	25 July 1989 – 22 July 1990	
Under-Secretary of State for Transport	Patrick McLoughlin	25 July 1989 – November 1990	
Under-Secretary of State for Transport	Christopher Chope	23 July 1990 – November 1990	
Secretary of State for Wales	**Peter Walker**	13 June 1987	
Secretary of State for Wales	**David Hunt**	4 May 1990	
Minister of State for Wales	Wyn Roberts	15 June 1987	
Under-Secretary of State for Wales	Ian Grist	15 June 1987 – 28 November 1990	
Attorney General	Patrick Mayhew	11 June 1987	
Solicitor General	Nicholas Lyell	13 June 1987	
Lord Advocate	Kenneth Cameron	June 1987	
Lord Advocate	Peter Fraser	4 January 1989	
Solicitor General for Scotland	Peter Fraser	June 1987	
Solicitor General for Scotland	Alan Rodger	14 January 1989	Not an MP
Treasurer of the Household	David Hunt	15 June 1987	
Treasurer of the Household	Tristan Garel-Jones	25 July 1989	
Treasurer of the Household	Alastair Goodlad	22 July 1990	
Comptroller of the Household	Robert Boscawen	June 1987	
Comptroller of the Household	Tristan Garel-Jones	26 July 1988	
Comptroller of the Household	Alastair Goodlad	25 July 1989	
Comptroller of the Household	Sir George Young	23 July 1990	
Vice-Chamberlain of the Household	Tristan Garel-Jones	June 1987	
Vice-Chamberlain of the Household	Michael Neubert	26 July 1988	
Vice-Chamberlain of the Household	Tony Durant	20 December 1988	
Vice-Chamberlain of the Household	David Lightbown	25 July 1990	
Captain of the Gentlemen-at-Arms	Bertram Bowyer	June 1987	
Captain of the Yeomen of the Guard	Andrew Davidson	June 1987	
Lords-in-Waiting	Richard Long	June 1987 – November 1990	
Lords-in-Waiting	Alexander Fermor-Hesketh	June 1987 – January 1989	
Lords-in-Waiting	Maxwell Aitken	June 1987 – 28 July 1988	
Lords-in-Waiting	Alexander Scrymgeour	June 1987 – 26 July 1989	
Lords-in-Waiting	Arthur Gore	18 June 1987 – 24 July 1989	
Lords-in-Waiting	Thomas Galbraith	12 August 1988 – 24 July 1989	
Lords-in-Waiting	Oliver Eden	13 February 1989 – 24 July 1989	
Lords-in-Waiting	Nicholas Lowther	26 July 1989 – 22 July 1990	
Lords-in-Waiting	Hugh Mackay	2 August 1989 – November 1990	
Lords-in-Waiting	Michael Bowes-Lyon	2 August 1989 – November 1990	
Lords-in-Waiting	Emily Blatch	15 January 1990 – 7 September 1990	
Lords-in-Waiting	Hugh Cavendish	14 September 1990 – November 1990	
Lords-in-Waiting	William Astor	11 October 1990 – November 1990	

== Notes ==
Preceded by Second Thatcher ministry	Government of the United Kingdom; 1987–1990	Succeeded by First Major ministry
