= Minister of State for Work and Pensions =

British government minister

United Kingdom Minister of State for Work and Pensions
- Royal Arms of His Majesty's Government

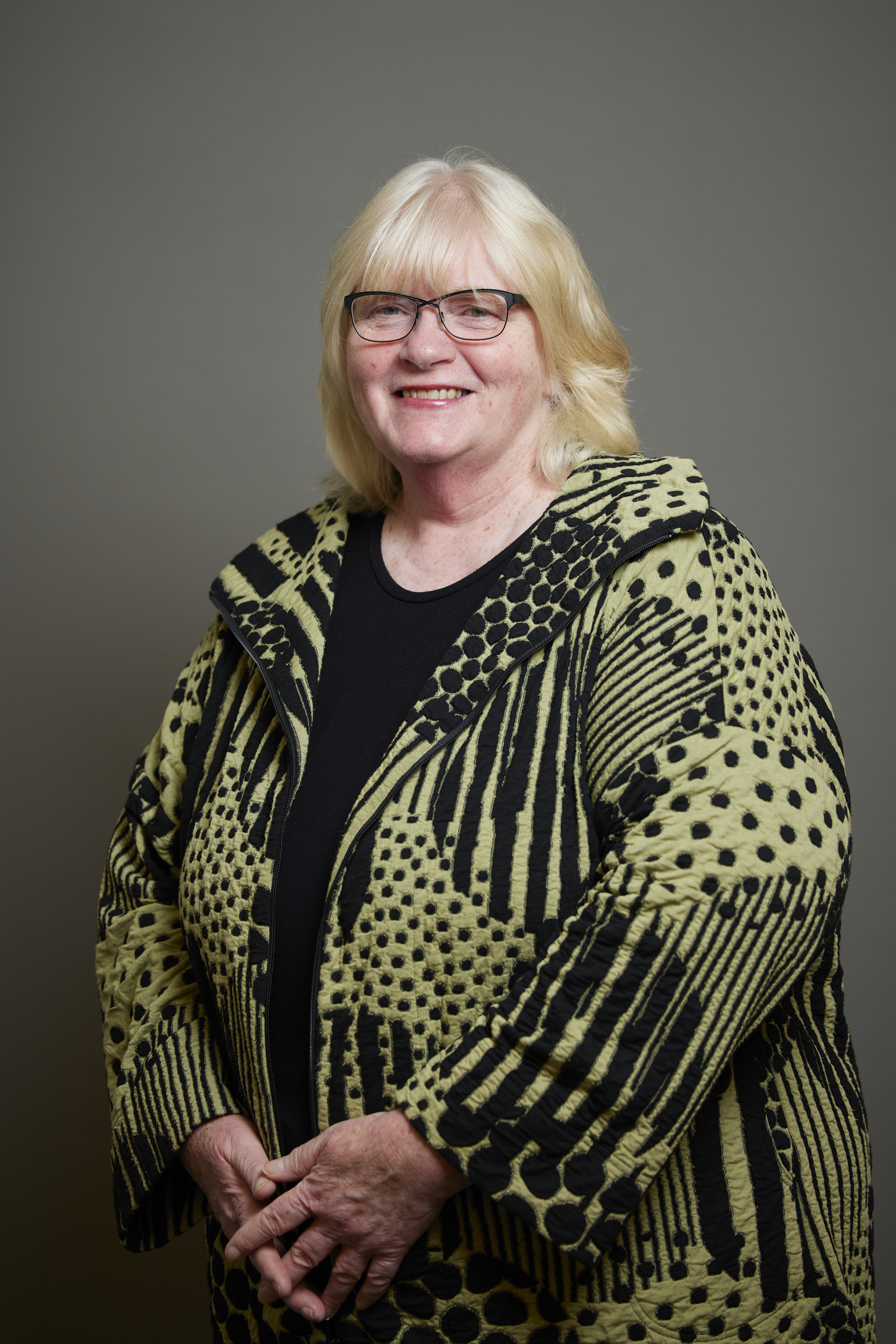
- Incumbent; Maeve Sherlock, Baroness Sherlock since 9 July 2024
- Department for Work and Pensions
- Style: Minister
- Nominator: Prime Minister of the United Kingdom
- Appointer: The Monarch; on advice of the Prime Minister
- Term length: At His Majesty's pleasure
- Website: www.gov.uk/dwp

The Minister for Work and Pensions, or Minister of State for Work and Pensions in the House of Lords, is a junior position in the Department for Work and Pensions in the British government. It is currently held by Maeve Sherlock, Baroness Sherlock, who took the office on 9 July 2024.

== Responsibilities ==
The minister's responsibilities include:

- Poverty (including Child Poverty Strategy, Crisis and Resilience Fund (CRF))
- Child Maintenance Service
- Parental Leave and Pay Review
- Disadvantaged Groups
- Maternity and Bereavement Benefits
- Oversight of the Social Security Advisory Committee
- Family Policy
- Research (including Star Chamber)
- Oversight of departmental activity including People and Capability, Non-Executive Directors, Ministerial Correspondence and Freedom of Information (FOI) processes.
- Commercial functions
- Legislation coordination, including Statutory Instruments

== Ministers for Work and Pensions ==
Name	Portrait	Entered office	Left office	Political party	Ministry
Parliamentary Under-Secretary of State, Health and Social Security
Reginald Wells-Pestell, Baron Wells-Pestell		3 January 1979	4 May 1979	Labour	Callaghan
George Young		7 May 1979	15 September 1981	Conservative	Thatcher I
Rodney Elton, 2nd Baron Elton		15 September 1981	6 April 1982	Conservative	Thatcher I
David Trefgarne, 2nd Baron Trefgarne		6 April 1982	14 June 1983	Conservative	Thatcher I
Simon Arthur, 4th Baron Glenarthur		14 June 1983	26 March 1985	Conservative	Thatcher II
Jean Barker, Baroness Trumpington		30 March 1985	13 June 1987	Conservative	Thatcher II
Roger Bootle-Wilbraham, 7th Baron Skelmersdale		13 June 1987	25 July 1988	Conservative	Thatcher III
Parliamentary Under-Secretary of State, Social Security
Roger Bootle-Wilbraham, 7th Baron Skelmersdale		25 July 1988	26 July 1989	Conservative	Thatcher III
Oliver Eden, 8th Baron Henley		25 July 1989	16 September 1993	Conservative	Thatcher III
Oliver Eden, 8th Baron Henley		25 July 1989	16 September 1993	Conservative	Major I
Oliver Eden, 8th Baron Henley		25 July 1989	16 September 1993	Conservative	Major II
William Astor, 4th Viscount Astor		16 September 1993	20 July 1994	Conservative	Major II
Minister of State for Social Security
John MacKay, Baron MacKay of Ardbrecknish		5 July 1995	4 May 1997	Conservative	Major II
Parliamentary Under-Secretary of State for Social Security
Patricia Hollis, Baroness Hollis of Heigham		6 May 1997	11 June 2001	Labour	Blair I
Parliamentary Under-Secretary of State for Work and Pensions
Patricia Hollis, Baroness Hollis of Heigham		11 June 2001	10 May 2005	Labour	Blair II
Philip Hunt, Baron Hunt of Kings Heath		10 May 2005	4 January 2007	Labour	Blair III
Bill McKenzie, Baron McKenzie of Luton		8 January 2007	6 May 2010	Labour	Brown
Minister of State for Welfare Reform
David Freud, Baron Freud		11 May 2010	21 December 2016	Conservative	Cameron–Clegg
David Freud, Baron Freud		11 May 2010	21 December 2016	Conservative	Cameron II
Parliamentary Under-Secretary of State for Work and Pensions
Oliver Eden, 8th Baron Henley		21 December 2016	15 June 2017	Conservative	May I
Peta Buscombe, Baroness Buscombe		11 June 2017	30 July 2019	Conservative	May II
Deborah Stedman-Scott, Baroness Stedman-Scott		30 July 2019	1 January 2023	Conservative	Johnson I & II; Truss; Sunak
James Younger, 5th Viscount Younger of Leckie		1 January 2023	5 July 2024	Conservative	Sunak
Maeve Sherlock, Baroness Sherlock		9 July 2024	17 December 2024	Labour	Starmer
Minister of State for Work and Pensions
Maeve Sherlock, Baroness Sherlock		17 December 2024	Incumbent	Labour	Starmer; Burnham
