= Lionel Bootle-Wilbraham, 6th Baron Skelmersdale =

British Army officer and peer

Brigadier The Right Honourable The Lord Skelmersdale DSO MC
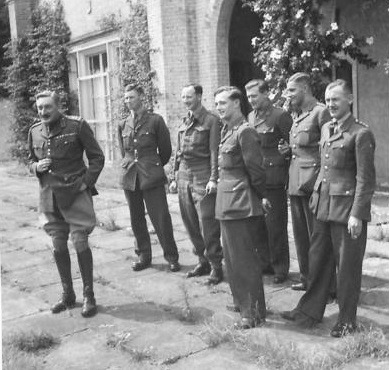
- Brigadier Lionel Bootle-Wilbraham and some members of his staff from the 126th Infantry Brigade, 7 August 1941.
- Born: 23 September 1896
- Died: 21 July 1973 (aged 76)
- Military career
- Allegiance: United Kingdom
- Branch: British Army
- Service years: 1914–1949
- Rank: Brigadier
- Service number: 13520
- Units: Hampshire Regiment; Coldstream Guards
- Commands: 137th Infantry Brigade; 32nd Guards Brigade; 215th Independent Infantry Brigade (Home); 126th Infantry Brigade; 2nd Battalion, Coldstream Guards
- Conflicts: First World War; Second World War
- Awards: Distinguished Service Order; Military Cross
- Other work: Director Associated British Oil Engine Company

Brigadier Lionel Bootle-Wilbraham, 6th Baron Skelmersdale, DSO, MC (23 September 1896 – 21 July 1973) was a British Army officer and peer who served in both the First and Second World War.

== Early life ==
Lionel Bootle-Wilbraham was born on 23 September 1896, the son of Major Lionel Bootle-Wilbraham, Royal Irish Fusiliers, and Lavinia, daughter of Abraham Wilson. The older Lionel was himself a grandson of Edward Bootle-Wilbraham, 1st Baron Skelmersdale. The younger Lionel was educated at Wellington College and Cheltenham College.

== Military career ==
On the outbreak of the First World War in August 1914, Bootle-Wilbraham joined the 3rd (Special Reserve) Battalion of the Hampshire Regiment. He then entered the Royal Military College, Sandhurst, as a wartime cadet in 1915 and passed out the same year, being commissioned into the Coldstream Guards in August 1915. He served with the regiment for the rest of the war, being awarded a Military Cross in 1917. The citation for the medal reads:

For conspicuous gallantry and devotion to duty. He remained on duty without break for forty hours, in spite of hostile barrages and heavy shell fire. It was entirely due to his courage, coolness, and untiring energy by day and night that the bridges were maintained during a difficult and important period. A few days later he displayed similar qualities of coolness and ability when working on pontoon approaches with his company.

Postwar, Bootle-Wilbraham saw service in Turkey during the Chanak Crisis of 1922, and then went to India to serve as Aide-de-Camp to the Governor of Madras (1924–1927). He was promoted to captain on 17 September 1924 and went to China during the Shanghai crisis of 1927, later returning to Madras as the Governor's Military Secretary (1929–1932). He also served in Egypt and Sudan in 1932.

Early in the Second World War, Bootle-Wilbraham commanded the 2nd Battalion, Coldstream Guards, in the Battle of France, which played an important part in holding the Dunkirk perimeter. He was acting commander of the 1st Guards Brigade during the final evacuation and for which he was later awarded the Distinguished Service Order (DSO).

On 20 September 1940, Bootle-Wilbraham took command of the 126th Infantry Brigade, part of the 42nd (East Lancashire) Infantry Division, a Territorial Army (TA) formation which had fought in France and been evacuated at Dunkirk. A year later the division was converted to armour, and Bootle-Wilbraham briefly transferred to command the 215th Independent Infantry Brigade (Home), and then to form and command a new 32nd Guards Brigade in October 1941. This formation was part of London District, charged with guarding some of the most vital locations in the capital; later it became the infantry component of the Guards Armoured Division.

Bootle-Wilbraham attended the Staff College, Camberley, in 1942 and was then appointed Brigadier, General Staff, in Eastern Command in 1943. In April 1945, Bootle-Wilbraham formed a new 137th Brigade headquarters to administer reception camps, selection and training battalions for wounded and temporarily unfit troops returning from overseas.

== Postwar career ==
Bootle-Wilbraham served as a regimental lieutenant colonel of the Coldstream Guards 1946–1949, and then retired with the rank of brigadier.

After retiring from the army, Bootle-Wilbraham joined the Associated British Oil Engine Company (later Brush Export Ltd) as a director and became its representative in the Caribbean and Latin America 1949–1959.

== Family ==
On 1 October 1936, he married Ann Quilter, daughter of Percy Cuthbert Quilter and granddaughter of Sir Cuthbert Quilter, 1st Baronet. She was born 19 May 1913 and died in 1974. They had four children:

- Hon. Lavinia, b 1 August 1937, married (1969) Robert Brian Noel Massey, and has issue.
- Hon. Olivia, b 31 December 1938, married (1961, divorced 1975) Anthony John Hoole Lowsley-Williams, and has issue
- Hon. Roger, later 7th Baron Skelmersdale (2 April 1945 – 31 October 2018)
- Hon. Daphne b 14 October 1946, married (1980, divorced 1992) Jocelyn Peter Gore Graham, and has issue

Lionel Bootle-Wilbraham succeeded as 6th Baron Skelmersdale in 1969 on the death of his cousin. He died on 21 July 1973 and was succeeded by his son Roger as 7th Baron Skelmersdale.

== Notes ==
Peerage of the United Kingdom
Preceded by Arthur Bootle-Wilbraham	Baron Skelmersdale; 1969–1973	Succeeded by Roger Bootle-Wilbraham
