= Emily Blatch, Baroness Blatch =

British peer (1937–2005)

The Right Honourable The Baroness Blatch CBE PC FRSA
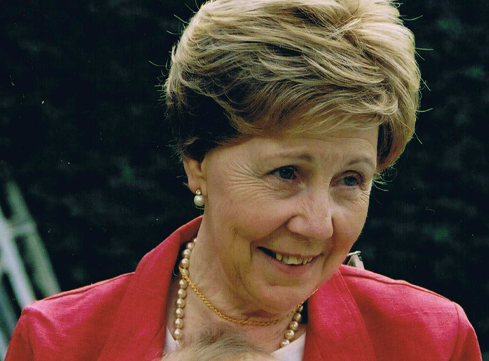
- Blatch in 2004

Minister of State for Immigration
- In office 20 July 1994 – 2 May 1997
- Prime Minister: John Major
- Preceded by: Charles Wardle
- Succeeded by: Mike O'Brien

Minister of State for Education
- In office 14 April 1992 – 20 July 1994
- Prime Minister: John Major
- Preceded by: Tim Eggar
- Succeeded by: Eric Forth

Minister of State for Environment (Note: As Parliamentary Under-Secretary of State from 7 September 1990 to 21 May 1991.)
- In office 7 September 1990 – 14 April 1992
- Prime Minister: John Major
- Preceded by: The Lord Strathclyde
- Succeeded by: David Maclean

Baroness-in-waiting Government whip
- In office 15 January 1990 – 7 September 1990
- Prime Minister: Margaret Thatcher
- Preceded by: Office established
- Succeeded by: The Lord Cavendish of Furness

Member of the House of Lords
- Lord Temporal
- Life peerage 7 April 1987 – 31 May 2005

Personal details
- Born: 24 July 1937
- Died: 31 May 2005 (aged 67)
- Party: Conservative
- Education: Prenton High School for Girls; Huntingdonshire Regional College

Emily May Blatch, Baroness Blatch, CBE, PC, FRSA (née Triggs; 24 July 1937 – 31 May 2005) was a British Conservative politician.

Born in Birkenhead, the daughter of Stephen and Sarah Triggs, she was educated at Prenton High School for Girls and at Huntingdonshire Regional College. At the age of 18, she joined the Women's Royal Air Force and served as an air traffic control assistant between 1955 and 1959.

Blatch entered politics in 1976 at the age of 39, as an elected councillor to Cambridgeshire County Council. Within a year she had been elected leader of the Conservative group and therefore leader of the council as the party enjoyed a majority at the time. She served as leader until 1989, during which time she helped pioneer reforming policies in education such as direct funding for schools from central government, a predecessor policy to the Academy (English school) programme introduced by the Labour government of 1997-2010 and later extended by the Conservative/Liberal Democrat coalition Government.

Blatch was appointed a Commander of the Order of the British Empire (CBE) in the 1983 Birthday Honours. She was created a life peeress as Baroness Blatch, of Hinchingbrooke in the County of Cambridgeshire on 4 July 1987.

From 1991 to 1994, she was Minister of State for Education and Immigration minister from 1994 to 1997. In 1997 she was given an honorary doctorate of Law from the University of Teesside.

Blatch was Deputy Leader of the Opposition in the House of Lords from 2001 until her death.

== Family ==
On 7 September 1963, she married John Richard Blatch AFC (a RAF test pilot) and they had four children: David (1965–1979), Hon. James Richard (b. 1967) and twins, Hon. Andrew Edward (b. 1968) and Hon. Elizabeth Anne (b. 1968). John Blatch died in 2024.

== Death ==
Lady Blatch was diagnosed with pancreatic cancer on 23 December 2003 and died in London on 31 May 2005, aged 67.
