= Huntingdonshire Regional College =

Coordinates: 52.339°N 0.177°W

Cambridge Regional College Huntingdon Campus

Location
- California Road; Huntingdon, Cambridgeshire, PE29 1BL; England

Information
- Type: Further Education
- Principal: Mark Robertson
- Gender: Mixed
- Website: http://www.camre.ac.uk/

Huntingdon Campus of Cambridge Regional College, formerly Huntingdonshire Regional College is a further education college located in the Huntingdonshire district of Cambridgeshire and Cambridge, England. The college has campuses in the town of Huntingdon and Cambridge.

The Huntingdon Campus of Cambridge Regional College offers a range of qualifications including GCSEs, apprenticeships, BTECs, and access courses. Study subjects include art and design, business, computing, construction, photography, travel and tourism and hair and beauty.

The college also offers a range of professional career courses including Association of Accounting Technicians (AAT), Chartered Management Institute (CMI) and CISCO. Specialist courses are run for adults with learning difficulties or disabilities.

The campus offers a range of services to the public, including a hair and beauty salon, a plant centre and a nursery.

Following an Ofsted grade of inadequate in October 2016, the governors decided to remove the college's senior management team. The governors decided that the college should merge with Cambridge Regional College and so the senior team from Cambridge Regional College took over the running of the college. The merger took place on 1 August 2017 and Huntingdonshire Regional College is now known as Cambridge Regional College Huntingdon Campus.
