= Prenton High School for Girls =

Location
- Hesketh Avenue; Birkenhead, WIRRAL, CH42 6RR; England
- Coordinates: 53°22′08″N 3°01′32″W

Information
- Type: Academy
- Established: 20th century
- Specialist: Science College, Arts College
- Department for Education URN: 137130 Tables
- Ofsted: Reports
- Headteacher: Lisa Ayling
- Gender: Girls
- Age: 11 to 16
- Enrolment: 750
- Houses: Bedford, Hesketh, Riviera
- Website: http://www.prentonhighschool.co.uk

Prenton High School for Girls is an academy school for girls between the ages of 11 and 16 in Rock Ferry, Birkenhead, Wirral, England.

== Overview ==
This school is smaller than average and serves approximately 750 female students in an area of significant social and economic disadvantage. About one-third of students are selected for grammar school education. The school became a specialist college for science, maths and the visual arts in July 2007. The school converted to academy status in August 2011.

The school is divided into three houses, each defined by its own colour: Bedford (green), Hesketh (yellow) and Riviera (red).

== Performance ==
In October 2007 and 2010/2011 the school was described as "an outstanding school" and received ratings of good or excellent in all areas rated by the Ofsted inspection team.
