= Simon Arthur, 4th Baron Glenarthur =

Peer, pilot and businessman

Major The Right Honourable The Lord Glenarthur DL
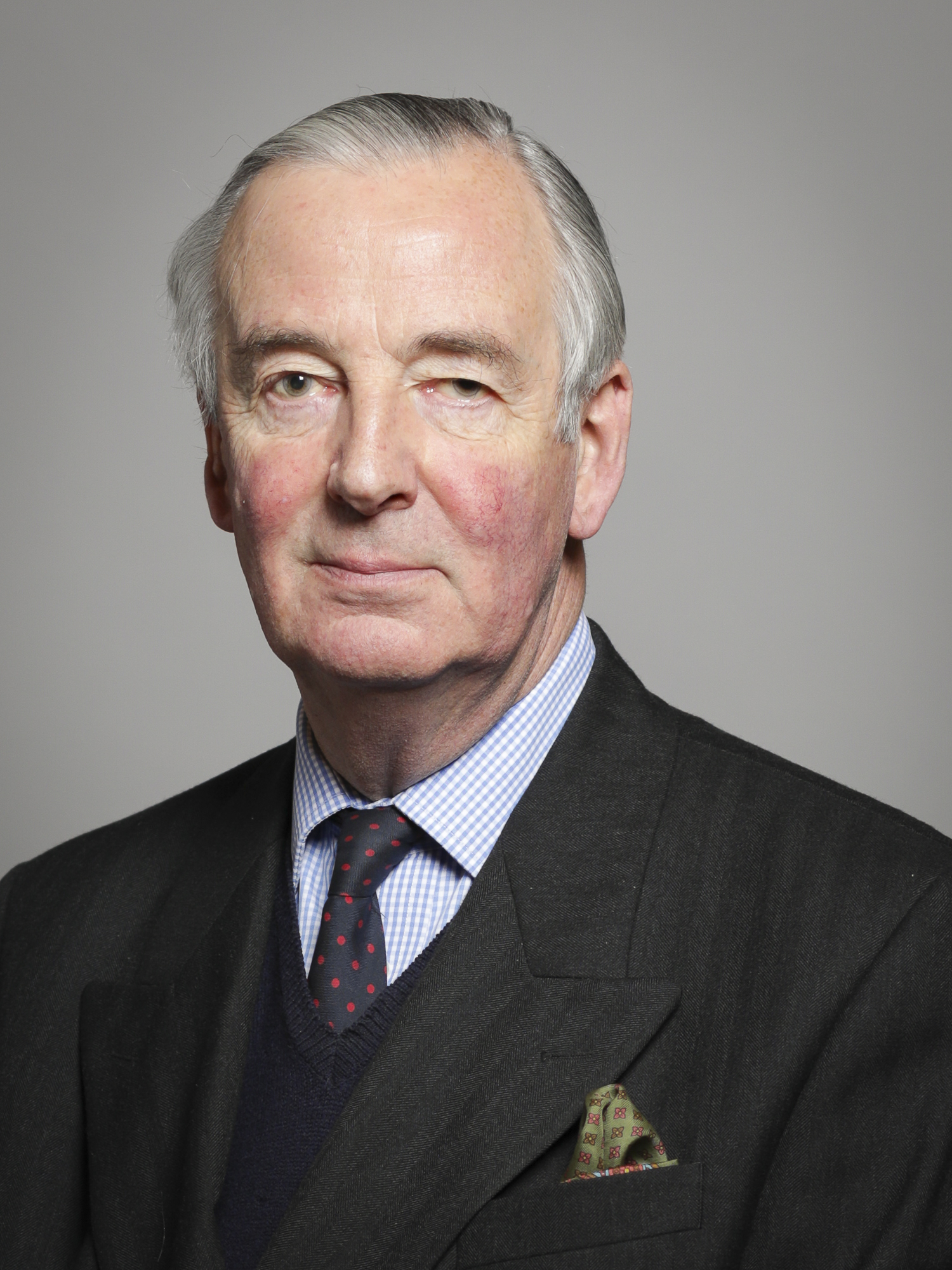
- Parliamentary portrait, 2019

Minister of State for Foreign and Commonwealth Affairs
- In office 13 June 1987 – 24 July 1989
- Prime Minister: Margaret Thatcher
- Preceded by: The Baroness Young
- Succeeded by: William Waldegrave

Minister of State for Scotland
- In office 10 September 1986 – 13 June 1987
- Prime Minister: Margaret Thatcher
- Preceded by: The Lord Gray of Contin
- Succeeded by: Ian Lang

Parliamentary Under-Secretary of state for Home Affairs
- In office 27 March 1985 – 10 September 1986
- Prime Minister: Margaret Thatcher
- Preceded by: The Lord Elton
- Succeeded by: Douglas Hogg

Parliamentary Under-Secretary of State for Health and Social Security
- In office 14 June 1983 – 26 March 1985
- Prime Minister: Margaret Thatcher
- Preceded by: Geoffrey Finsberg
- Succeeded by: The Baroness Trumpington

Lord-in-waiting Government Whip
- In office 27 May 1982 – 10 June 1983
- Prime Minister: Margaret Thatcher
- Preceded by: The Lord Cullen of Ashbourne
- Succeeded by: The Baroness Trumpington

Member of the House of Lords
- Lord Temporal
- Hereditary peerage 21 June 1977 – 11 November 1999
- Preceded by: The 3rd Baron Glenarthur
- Succeeded by: Seat abolished
- Elected Hereditary Peer; 11 November 1999 – 29 April 2026
- Election: 1999
- Preceded by: Seat established
- Succeeded by: Seat abolished

Personal details
- Born: Simon Mark Arthur; 7 October 1944 (age 81)
- Party: Conservative
- Spouse: Susan Barry

Simon Mark Arthur, 4th Baron Glenarthur (born 7 October 1944), is a British peer, pilot and businessman. Having succeeded to his father's titles in 1976, he was one of the ninety hereditary peers elected to remain in the House of Lords after the House of Lords Act 1999, and sat as a Conservative.

== Career ==
The son of the 3rd Baron Glenarthur, he was born into a Scottish mercantile family and was educated at Eton College. Commissioned to the 10th Royal Hussars in 1963, Glenarthur was Aide-de-Camp to the High Commissioner of Aden in 1964 and 1965. Between 1976 and 1980, he served as a Major in The Royal Hussars, Territorial and Army Volunteer Reserve, and was Captain for British Airways Helicopters between 1976 and 1982.

Lord Glenarthur served in the government of Margaret Thatcher in the House of Lords, and in 1982 became a Lord-in-waiting (Government Whip) and became Parliamentary Under Secretary of State at the Department of Health and Social Security (DHSS) in 1983. He then moved to the Home Office before being promoted to Minister of State for Scotland in 1986. His last ministerial appointment was as Minister of State for Foreign and Commonwealth Affairs from 1987 to 1989. Amongst his particular responsibilities were Hong Kong and the United Kingdom's relationship with China.

From 1977 to 1982, Lord Glenarthur was director of Aberdeen and Texas Corporate Finance Ltd and from 1979 to 1982 for ABTEX Computer Systems Ltd. He was Senior Executive of Hanson plc from 1989 to 1996, Deputy Chairman of Hanson Pacific Ltd from 1994 to 1998 and director of Whirly Bird Services Ltd from 1995 to 2004. He was further consultant to British Aerospace from 1989 to 1999 and President of the National Council for Civil Protection from 1991 to 2003. For the British Helicopter Advisory Board, he was chairman between 1992 and 2004, and is its president since 2004. Lord Glenarthur was director of Lewis Group in 1993 and 1994, was consultant to Chevron UK Ltd from 1994 to 1997 and director of Millennium Chemicals from 1996 to 2004. He was also consultant to Hanson plc from 1996 to 1999 and to the Imperial Tobacco Group plc from 1996 to 1998, chairman of the European Helicopter Association from 1996 to 2003 and of the International Federation of Helicopter Associations from 1997 to 2004, and is governor of the Nuffield Hospitals since 2000. Between 2001 and 2002, he was consultant to Audax Trading Ltd, and director between 2003 and 2005. Since 2001, he has been Commissioner of the Royal Hospital Chelsea, since 2002 director of The Medical Defence Union and since 2005 director of Andax Global.

Glenarthur has been council member of The Air League since 1994 and was member of the National Employers Liaison Committee for Her Majesty's Reserve Forces from 1996 to 2002. Since 2002, he is also chairman of the National Employer Advisory Board for Britain's Reserve Forces. He is Lieutenant of the Royal Company of Archers, since 2002 Honorary Colonel of the 306 Field Hospital and since 2004 Honorary Air Commodore of the 612 (County of Aberdeen) Squadron, Royal Auxiliary Air Force. In 1992, Glenarthur became a Freeman of the Guild of Air Pilots and Air Navigators and in 1996 a Liveryman. Having been a member of the Chartered Institute of Logistics and Transport since 1978, he was made a Fellow in 1999. He is further a Fellow of the Royal Aeronautical Society since 1992, and a Freeman of the City of London since 1996.

On 1 August 2008, Glenarthur was awarded the Grand Cross of the Order of the Crown of Tonga by the King of Tonga in the Coronation honours list.

Since 2010, Lord Glenarthur has been governor and a trustee of King Edward VII's Hospital Sister Agnes. In his role as governor, he wrote to the Australian radio station 2Day FM in the wake of their hoax call to the King Edward VII's Hospital concerning the pregnancy of the Duchess of Cambridge, and the subsequent death of nurse Jacintha Saldanha who took the call. Glenarthur wrote that it was 'truly appalling' that the call was approved by radio management before broadcast.

== Personal life ==
Glenarthur has been married to Susan Barry since 1969; they have two children.

Glenarthur is a member of the Scottish Episcopal Church.

Coat of arms of Simon Arthur, 4th Baron Glenarthur
Crest On a rock a pelican in her piety Proper. Escutcheon Sable an escarbuncle Or within an orle of bezants. Supporters Dexter a bay horse Proper, sinister a lion rampant Gules. Motto Fac Et Spera

== Honours ==
- Tonga:
  - 1 August 2008: Grand Cross of the Order of the Crown of Tonga.

== Notes ==
Peerage of the United Kingdom
Preceded by Matthew Arthur	Baron Glenarthur; 1976–present Member of the House of Lords (1977–1999)	Incumbent; Heir apparent: Hon. Edward Arthur
Parliament of the United Kingdom
New office created by the House of Lords Act 1999	Elected hereditary peer to the House of Lords under the House of Lords Act 1999; 1999–2026	Position abolished under the House of Lords (Hereditary Peers) Act 2026
