= Kenneth Carlisle =

British politician

Sir Kenneth Carlisle Kt

Lord Commissioner of the Treasury
- In office 27 July 1988 – 22 July 1990
- Prime Minister: Margaret Thatcher
- Preceded by: Michael Neubert
- Succeeded by: Sydney Chapman

Member of Parliament for Lincoln
- In office 3 May 1979 – 8 April 1997
- Preceded by: Margaret Jackson
- Succeeded by: Gillian Merron

Personal details
- Born: Kenneth Melville Carlisle; 25 March 1941 (age 85) Hiraethog Rural District
- Party: Conservative
- Spouse: Lady Carla Cooper Carlisle
- Education: Harrow School
- Alma mater: Magdalen College, Oxford

Sir Kenneth Melville Carlisle (born 25 March 1941) is a politician in the United Kingdom. He was the Conservative Member of Parliament for Lincoln from 1979 to 1997.

== Early life ==
Born in Hiraethog, Denbighshire, Wales, he is the son of Kenneth Ralph Malcolm Peter Carlisle and Elizabeth Mary McLaren. His father was a Director then Chairman of Liebig Extract of Meat Company which owned the brands of Oxo and Fray Bentos. The company was bought by Brooke Bond in 1970 and Unilever in 1984, and Kenneth Carlisle worked at the company for eight years from 1966 to 1974. He was educated at Harrow School and Magdalen College, Oxford, where he gained a BA in Law. He became a barrister at the Inner Temple in 1965. In 1974, he took over running of an arable farm on his father's 1,100-acre (4.5 km^{2}) Wyken estate near Stanton in Suffolk.

== Parliamentary career ==
Carlisle was elected as MP for Lincoln at the 1979 general election, becoming the first Conservative to win the seat in 50 years. The Almanac of British Politics noted that his win was helped by the presence of a candidate for the Democratic Labour Party, Freddie Stockdale, who drew votes away from the incumbent Labour MP Margaret Jackson. In the 1980s he substantially increased his majority, thanks in part to the addition of several middle-class suburbs to the north of Lincoln before the 1983 general election.

He was a Parliamentary Under-Secretary of State at the Ministry of Defence from October 1990 - March 1992 and the Minister for Roads and Traffic at the Department of Transport from May 1992 - May 1993. He is on the Council of the Royal Horticultural Society.

He retired as an MP at the 1997 general election. His successor as Conservative candidate in Lincoln lost the seat to Labour's Gillian Merron by over 11,000 votes. New boundaries introduced for the election contributed to this defeat, as it was projected that had Lincoln been fought on these boundaries in 1992, it would have had a Labour majority of about 1,000 (whereas Carlisle had won by just over 2,000 votes on the old boundaries).

== Farming ==
His farm has a 7-acre (28,000 m^{2}) vineyard, shop and the Leaping Hare restaurant. The vineyard which has the Bacchus grape produces about 14,000 bottles of wine a year. He is interested in conservation via the Countryside Stewardship Scheme, notably that of the grey partridge.

== Personal life ==
He married Carla from Mississippi in 1986. They have a son, Sam. From 1996 to 1998 and 2000–12, his wife wrote the weekly Spectator column for Country Life magazine.

== Honours ==
- He was knighted in the 1994 Queen's Birthday Honours List "For political service". This allowed him to be called "Sir Kenneth Carlisle".

Parliament of the United Kingdom
Preceded by Margaret Jackson	Member of Parliament for Lincoln; 1979–1997	Succeeded by Gillian Merron
