= Roger Bootle-Wilbraham, 7th Baron Skelmersdale =

British politician

The Right Honourable The Lord Skelmersdale
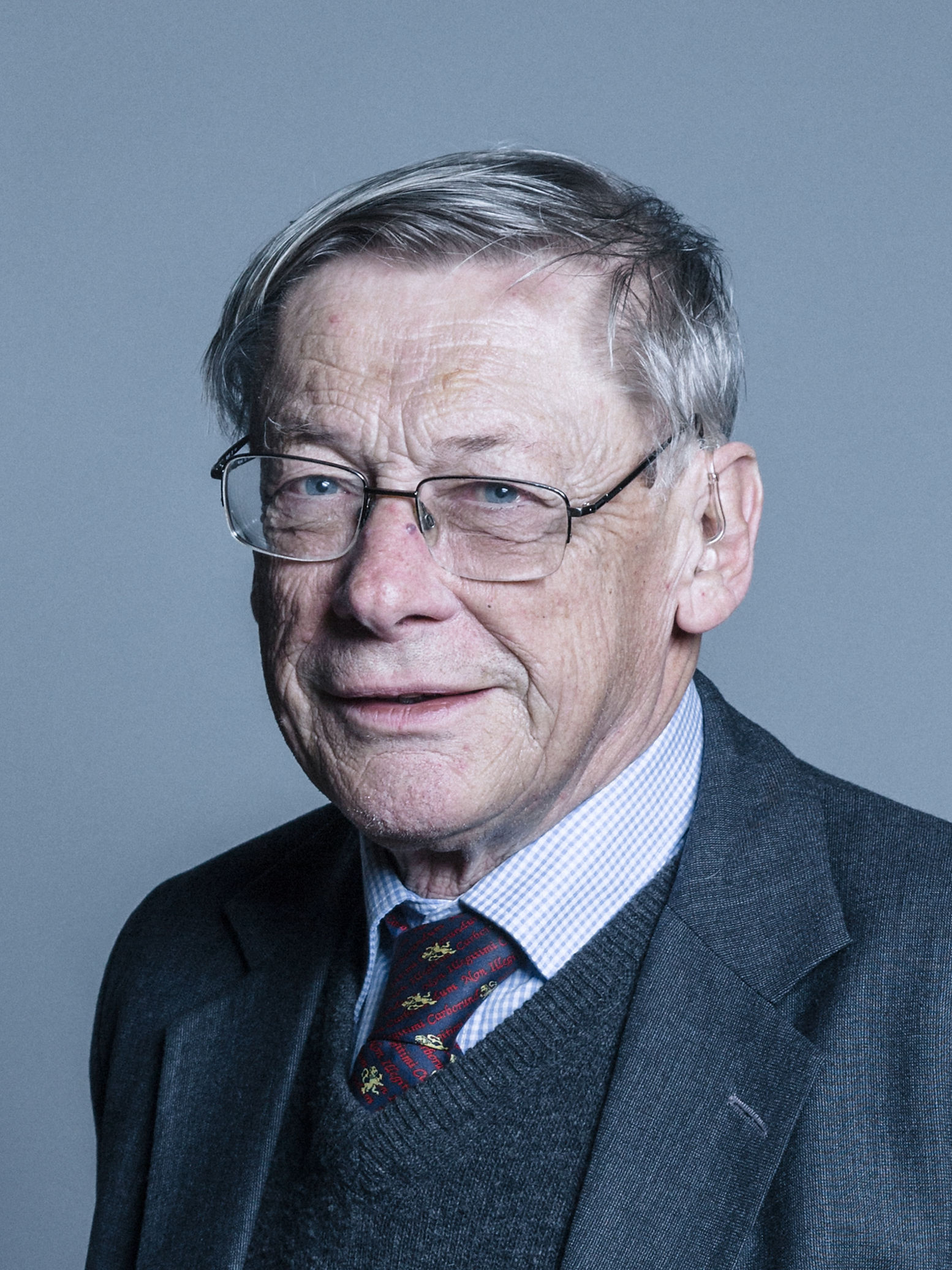

Parliamentary Under-Secretary of State for Northern Ireland
- In office 26 July 1989 – 28 November 1990
- Prime Minister: Margaret Thatcher
- Preceded by: The Lord Lyell
- Succeeded by: Jeremy Hanley
Junior ministerial offices 1981–1989
Parliamentary Under-Secretary of State for Social Security
In office 25 July 1988 – 26 July 1989
Prime Minister	Margaret Thatcher
Preceded by	Office established
Succeeded by	The Lord Henley
Parliamentary Under-Secretary of State for Health and Social Security
In office 13 June 1987 – 25 July 1988
Prime Minister	Margaret Thatcher
Preceded by	Michael Portillo
Succeeded by	Edwina Currie
Parliamentary Under-Secretary of State for Environment
In office 10 September 1986 – 13 June 1987
Prime Minister	Margaret Thatcher
Preceded by	Angela Rumbold
Succeeded by	Christopher Chope
Lord-in-waiting Government Whip
In office 9 January 1981 – 10 September 1986
Prime Minister	Margaret Thatcher
Preceded by	The Lord Trefgarne
Succeeded by	The Lord Hesketh

Member of the House of Lords
- Lord Temporal
- Hereditary peerage 8 July 1974 – 11 November 1999
- Preceded by: The 6th Baron Skelmersdale
- Succeeded by: Seat abolished
- Elected Hereditary Peer; 11 November 1999 – 31 October 2018
- Election: 1999
- Preceded by: Seat established
- Succeeded by: The 15th Lord Reay

Personal details
- Born: 2 April 1945
- Died: 31 October 2018 (aged 73)
- Party: Conservative
- Education: Eton College

Roger Bootle-Wilbraham, 7th Baron Skelmersdale (2 April 1945 – 31 October 2018), was a British politician and Conservative member of the House of Lords.

He was educated at Eton College and Lord Wandsworth College.

From 1972, Lord Skelmersdale and his wife Christine owned and operated Broadleigh Gardens, a horticultural centre at Barr House, Bishops Hull, Taunton, Somerset.

Lord Skelmersdale succeeded to the peerage in 1973 on the death of his father Lionel Bootle-Wilbraham, 6th Baron Skelmersdale. He was made a House of Lords whip in Margaret Thatcher's government in 1981, holding that position until 1986. He then moved to the Department of Environment as a Parliamentary Under Secretary of State and then to the Department of Health and Social Security in 1987 before that department was split in 1988.

Lord Skelmersdale continued at the Department of Social Security until 1989 when he was assigned to the Northern Ireland Office, serving until the end of Thatcher's premiership in November 1990. He was not reappointed by John Major.

With the passage of the House of Lords Act 1999, Lord Skelmersdale, along with almost all other hereditary peers, lost his automatic right to sit in the House of Lords. He was, however, among the ninety elected hereditary peers to remain in the House of Lords pending completion of House of Lords reform.

Lord Skelmersdale was, as of 2006, a Conservative Shadow Minister for the Department for Work and Pensions as a member of David Cameron's front bench team, however, he did not become a minister in the coalition Cameron ministry starting in 2010.

He served as a Deputy Chairman of Committees from 1991 to 2003 (and Deputy Speaker from 1995), and again from 2010 to 2014.

Lord Skelmersdale was a bridge player and a member of the all-party parliamentary bridge group.

Lord Skelmersdale died on 31 October 2018 at the age of 73.

== Notes ==
Political offices
Preceded by The Lord Trefgarne	Lord-in-waiting; 1981–1986	Succeeded by The Lord Hesketh
Peerage of the United Kingdom
Preceded by Lionel Bootle-Wilbraham	Baron Skelmersdale; 1973–2018; Member of the House of Lords (1974–1999)	Succeeded by Andrew Bootle-Wilbraham
Parliament of the United Kingdom
New office created by the House of Lords Act 1999	Elected hereditary peer to the House of Lords under the House of Lords Act 1999; 1999–2018	Succeeded by The Lord Reay
