= David Trefgarne, 2nd Baron Trefgarne =

British politician (born 1941)

The Right Honourable The Lord Trefgarne PC
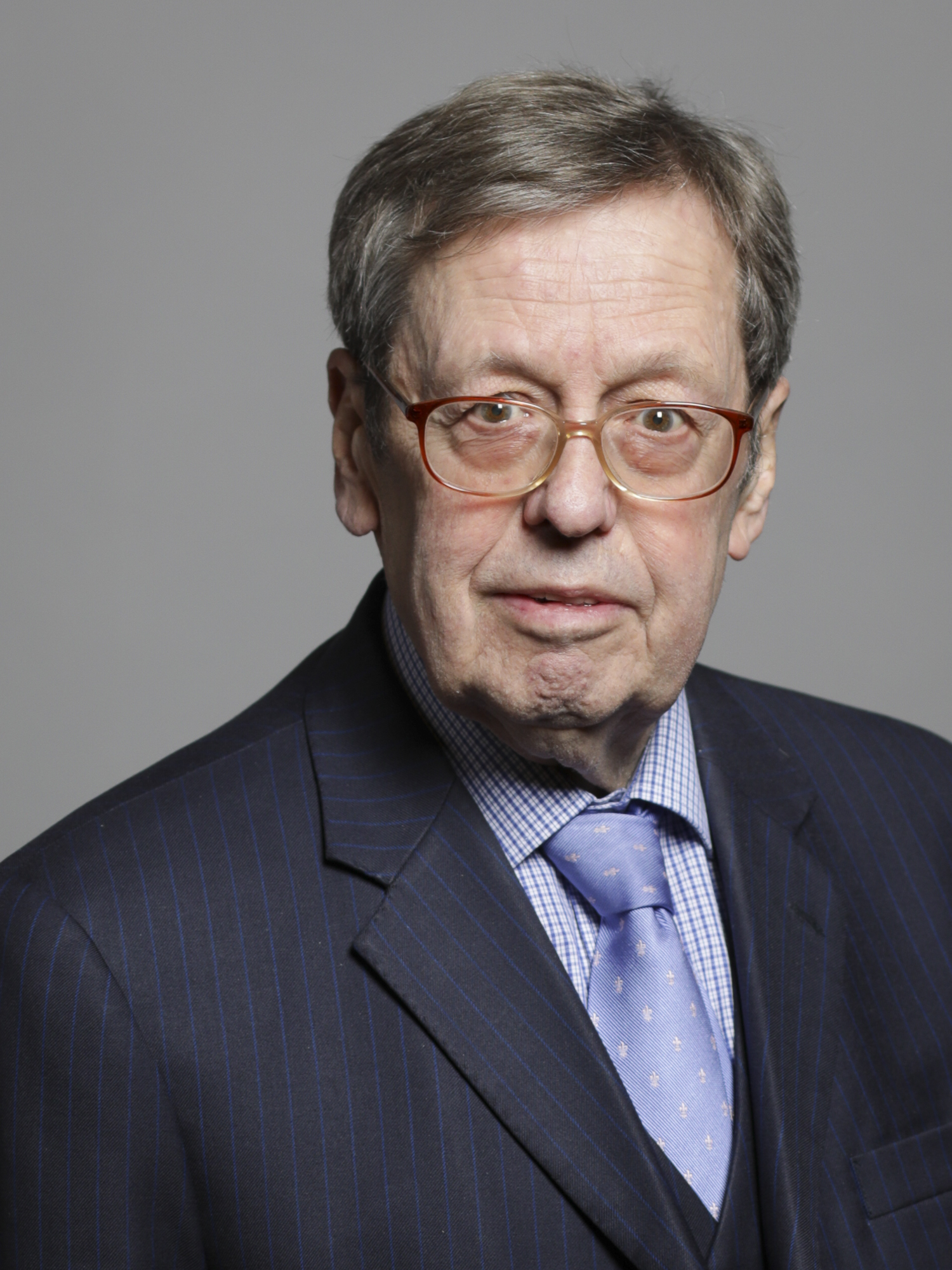
- Official portrait, 2020

Minister of State for Trade
- In office 25 July 1989 – 23 July 1990
- Prime Minister: Margaret Thatcher
- Preceded by: Alan Clark
- Succeeded by: Tim Sainsbury
Ministerial offices 1979–1989
Minister of State for Defence Procurement
In office 21 May 1986 – 24 July 1989
Prime Minister	Margaret Thatcher
Preceded by	Norman Lamont
Succeeded by	Alan Clark
Minister of State for Defence Support
In office 2 September 1985 – 21 May 1986
Prime Minister	Margaret Thatcher
Preceded by	Office created
Succeeded by	Office abolished
Parliamentary Under-Secretary of State for Armed Forces
In office 14 June 1983 – 1 September 1985
Prime Minister	Margaret Thatcher
Preceded by	Jerry Wiggin
Succeeded by	Roger Freeman
Parliamentary Under-Secretary of State for Health and Social Security
In office 6 April 1982 – 14 June 1983
Prime Minister	Margaret Thatcher
Preceded by	The Lord Elton
Succeeded by	John Patten
Parliamentary Under-Secretary of State for Foreign and Commonwealth Affairs
In office 14 September 1981 – 6 April 1982
Prime Minister	Margaret Thatcher
Preceded by	Richard Luce
Succeeded by	Malcolm Rifkind
Parliamentary Under-Secretary of State for Trade
In office 5 January 1981 – 15 September 1981
Prime Minister	Margaret Thatcher
Preceded by	Norman Tebbit
Succeeded by	Iain Sproat
Lord-in-waiting Government Whip
In office 9 May 1979 – 5 January 1981
Prime Minister	Margaret Thatcher
Preceded by	The Lord Wallace of Coslany
Succeeded by	The Lord Skelmersdale

Member of the House of Lords
- Lord Temporal
- Hereditary peerage 29 June 1962 – 11 November 1999
- Preceded by: The 1st Baron Trefgarne
- Succeeded by: Seat abolished
- Elected Hereditary Peer; 11 November 1999 – 27 March 2026
- Election: 1999
- Preceded by: Seat established
- Succeeded by: Seat abolished

Personal details
- Born: 31 March 1941 (age 85)
- Party: Conservative
- Education: Haileybury
- Alma mater: Princeton University

David Garro Trefgarne, 2nd Baron Trefgarne (born 31 March 1941), is a British Conservative politician. He was the longest-serving member of the House of Lords from 2021 to 2026.

== Biography ==
The son of George Trefgarne, 1st Baron Trefgarne, Trefgarne succeeded his father as 2nd Baron Trefgarne in 1960 at the age of 19, having attended Haileybury and Imperial Service College. He took his seat in the House of Lords on his 21st birthday in 1962. In contrast to his father, who was a Liberal and later Labour politician, he chose to sit on the Conservative benches.

Trefgarne was an opposition Whip from 1977 to 1979 and then served in the Conservative administration of Margaret Thatcher as a Government Whip from 1979 to 1981 and as Parliamentary Under-Secretary of State at the Department of Trade in 1981, at the Foreign and Commonwealth Office from 1981 to 1982, at the Department of Health and Social Security from 1982 to 1983 and at the Ministry of Defence from 1983 to 1985. The latter year he was promoted to Minister of State for Defence Support, a post he held until 1986, and then served as Minister of State for Defence Procurement from 1986 to 1989 and as a Minister of State at the Department of Trade and Industry from 1989 to 1990. In 1989 he was admitted to the Privy Council.

Trefgarne was a qualified commercial pilot. Immediately prior to Thatcher's election victory he had been working as a First Officer on the Handley Page Dart Herald for British Island Airways, which company had provided her with a personal jet during the election campaign. After the election he resigned from his flying job to join the government.

Trefgarne was president of the Institution of Incorporated Engineers when they merged with the Institution of Electrical Engineers in 2006.

Lord Trefgarne was a member of the House of Lords as one of the ninety hereditary peers elected by their colleagues to remain after the passing of the House of Lords Act of 1999 until 2026. According to the Electoral Reform Society, he has since blocked further reform of the Lords, tabling 'wrecking' amendments to a draft Bill to abolish by-elections for hereditary peers, proposed by Lord Grocott in 2018.

Trefgarne became the longest-serving member of the House of Lords on 26 April 2021 after the retirement of Lord Denham. He retired from the House on 27 March 2026.

== Arms ==
Coat of arms of David Trefgarne, 2nd Baron Trefgarne
Coronet That of a British Baron. Crest On a mount Vert a tree Proper suspended therefrom an escutcheon Or charged with a portcullis Gules. Escutcheon Or a dragon rampant Gules over all on a bend Azure a leek of the first between two thistles Proper. Supporters On either side a Herefordshire bull charged on the shoulder with an escutcheon Or thereon a portcullis Azure. Motto Ratione Et Concillio

== Notes ==
Peerage of the United Kingdom
Preceded by George Trefgarne	Baron Trefgarne; 1960–present Member of the House of Lords (1962–1999)	Incumbent; Heir apparent: Hon. George Trefgarne
Parliament of the United Kingdom
New office created by the House of Lords Act 1999	Elected hereditary peer to the House of Lords under the House of Lords Act 1999; 1999–2026	Vacant
Honorary titles
Preceded by The Lord Denham	Longest-serving member in the House of Lords; 2021–2026	Succeeded by The Earl of Liverpool
