= André Zirnheld =

French soldier (1913–1942)

- Born: 13 March 1913; Paris, France
- Died: 27 July 1942 (aged 29) near Sidi Haneish Airfield, Egypt
- Military career
- Allegiance: France; Free French Forces
- Branch: French Army (1939); Free French Forces (1940–1941)
- Service years: 1939–1941
- Rank: Aspirant
- Units: 1^{re} Compagnie Chasseurs Parachutistes; 3rd French Special Air Service or French 3rd Parachute Chasseur Regiment
- Conflicts: Second World War: North African Campaign; Western Desert Campaign; Operation Compass; Battle of Sidi Barrani; Raid on Berka 3; Raid on Sidi Haneish Airfield (DOW)
- Awards: Médaille militaire Croix de guerre 1939–1945 avec deux palmes

André Louis Arthur Zirnheld (March 7, 1913 – July 27, 1942) was a French paratrooper, a member of the Free French Air Force, and a member of the French Squadron, Special Air Service during World War II. He is famous for being the first French paratrooper officer killed in action and the author of the poem "The Paratrooper's Prayer".

== Personal life ==
According to the family grave family in Batignolles Cemetery, Zirnheld was born in Paris to Alsatian Catholic parents.

Zirnheld had been a pupil at the Pensionnat diocésain de Passy, a private Catholic school. A graduating with a degree in philosophy, he became a college professor before the war. In 1937, he was appointed professor of philosophy at the Lycee Carnot de Tunis in Tunis, Tunisia. In October 1938, Zirnheld served as professor at the French Secular Mission in Tartus, Syria.

== Involvement in the Second World War ==
At the outbreak of the war in 1939, Zirnheld was assigned to a Défense Contre Avions (DCA) unit in Lebanon. Zirnheld tried to transfer to serve in the Metropolitan Army in France, but the Armistice was signed before he could do so. Zirnheld then escaped to British-held Palestine to join the Free French forces. He was assigned to the 1st Colonial Infantry Battalion as a private and served at the Battle of Sidi Barani. Because of his education, he was reassigned as the deputy director of the Department of Information and Propaganda in Cairo. Although this was a "safe" position, he requested a frontline posting. He was then sent to the Officer Candidates' School in Brazzaville, French Congo, where he graduated fifth in his class as an Aspirant (Brevet-Lieutenant).

He was airborne trained and was assigned to the Middle East in February 1942 to the 1^{er} Compagnie de Chasseurs Parachutistes, assigned to the Forces Aériennes Françaises Libres (FAFL, Free French Air Force). This was later folded into the 3rd French Special Air Service or French 3rd Parachute Chasseur Regiment. Although an officer in the Free French forces, Zirnheld was rated as a corporal in the SAS. This was because no officer slots were open at the time, Zirnheld had just joined the unit, and had no seniority. The SAS, originally conceived as an airborne formation, had at this point been converted to a raiding force equipped with machine-gun-armed jeeps.

On his first mission, Zirnheld commanded a team of four men who raided Luftwaffe airfield Berka 3, Libya on 12 June 1942, destroying six enemy aircraft on the ground. He then received, as all SAS after their first mission, his SAS operational wings or "Egyptian wings". His later missions included the sabotage of a railway track, attacks on Axis convoys, and taking Luftwaffe prisoners. For his actions, he was proposed for the French Médaille militaire and British Military Cross and received the Croix de Guerre ("Cross of War") with 2 palmes en vermeil (gilded silver Palm Branch pins worn on the medal's ribbon, signifying two Theater-level Mentions-in-Dispatches).

== The Sidi-Haneish Raid ==
Zirnheld's fourth and last mission was a now legendary SAS raid on Sidi Haneish Airfield on the night of 26 July and the early morning of 27 July 1942. An 18-jeep force attacked the field by driving up the runway in an inverted "V" formation and strafing the parked planes. 37 bombers and transports were destroyed for the loss of two SAS troopers. Zirnheld's jeep had a flat, but he was picked up by Aspirant François Martin. Zirnheld and Martin drove off, but Martin's jeep broke down, so they began traveling on foot. Three hours later, with the sun now up, a flight of four Stuka dive-bombers spotted them and strafed them. Zirnheld was hit in the shoulder and abdomen on their second pass. Zirnheld died of his wounds thirteen hours later. His last words to Martin were, "Je vais vous quitter. Tout est en ordre en moi" ("I am leaving you. Everything is in order within me").

== The Paratrooper's Prayer ==
While going through a notebook Martin recovered from Zirnheld's body, a text was found that would become La Prière du Para (The Paratrooper's Prayer). Zirnheld had written it before the war, while working in Tunisia in 1938. It is now the official prayer of both the French, Portuguese and Brazilian Airborne forces. Zirnheld and his prayer has also been quoted partially or had its content edited to fit its intended audience. Zirnheld himself, virtually unknown outside France, has been adopted by Allied nations who assume him to be one of their own. He has been quoted by British and Dutch Paras and American Soldiers and Marines, making him a sort of movable "unknown soldier".

As for those who view Zirnheld as a man of peace, he was once quoted as saying:

I need not complain about the war. Because of it, I have had to learn to live through anything. Because of it, you could say I have benefited, very greatly benefited even, than that of the life that I have led without it. It is on the contrary peace, that is the situation, the career that had been artificial and dangerous for my progress. After the war, the problem will be to discover a similar pace.

== Burial ==
Zirnheld's body was first buried in an hastily dug grave in the Libyan desert by Aspirant Martin, who left directions and landmarks to help locate its whereabouts. After the North African campaign, Zirnheld's remains were located and interred in the British military cemetery at Mersa Matruh, Egypt. After the war Zirnheld's remains were disinterred and sent back to France where they were placed in the family grave in Batignolles Cemetery.

== Medals ==
- Compagnon de la Libération – décret du 1er Mai 1943 (Companion of the Liberation – Decree of 1 May 1943)
- Médaille militaire (Military Medal)
- Croix de guerre 39/45 avec 2 palmes (War Cross 1939/1945 with 2 palms)
- Médaille de la Résistance avec rosette (Medal of the Resistance with Officer's Rosette)

== Further legacy ==
- Camp Aspirant Zirnheld is named after Zirnheld. Located north of Pau, it is one of the three sites of the School of Airborne Troops (and the location of Musée Mémorial des Parachutistes).
- The fourth promotion (class of 1964-1965) of the École militaire interarmes is known as the promotion Zirnheld.

== See also ==
- List of French paratrooper units
- 1st Marine Infantry Parachute Regiment
