= First Thatcher ministry =

Government of the United Kingdom from 1979 to 1983

- Cabinet of the United Kingdom
- 1979–1983
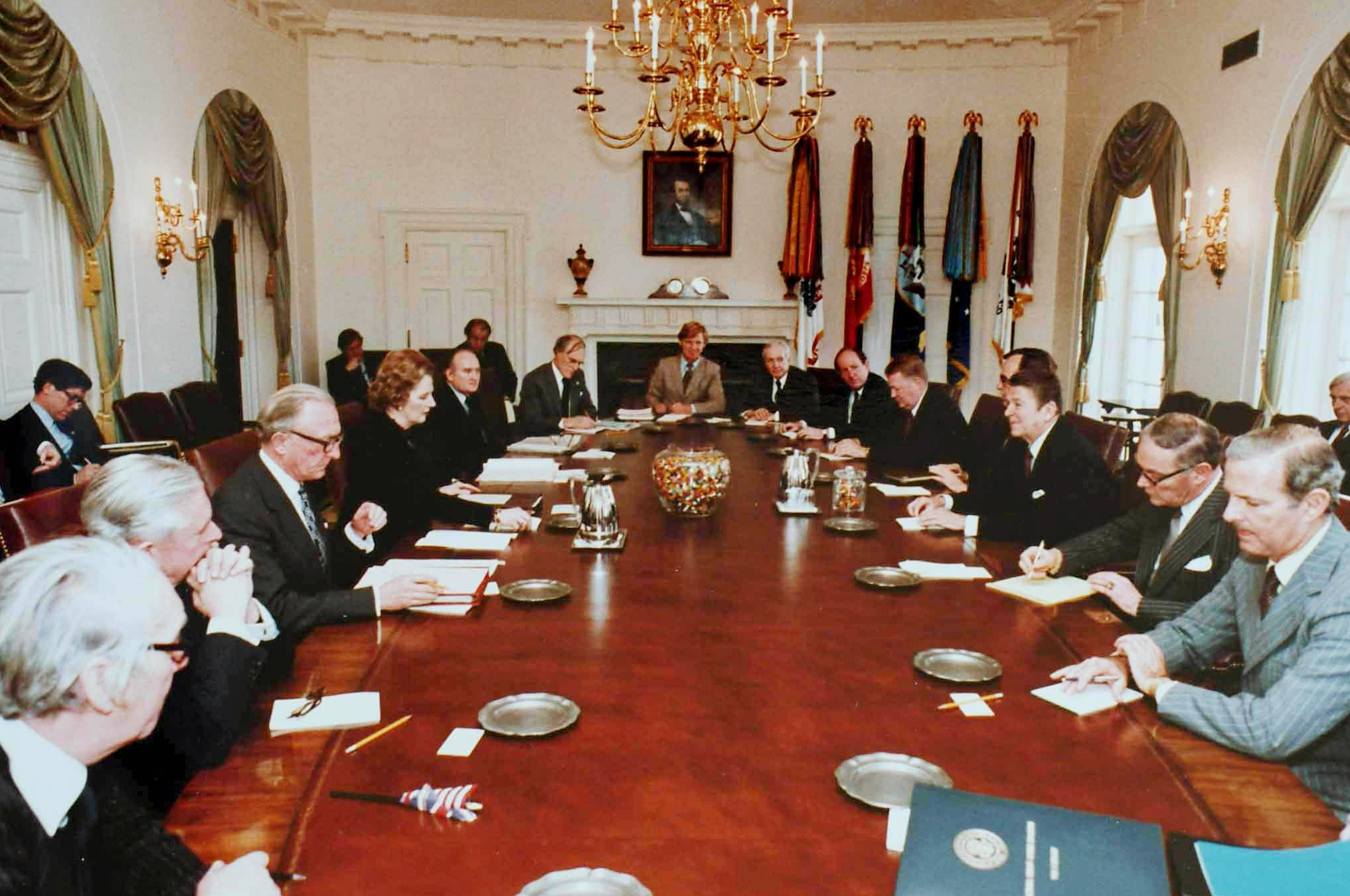
- Thatcher with members of her cabinet (left) during talks with Ronald Reagan and members of his cabinet (right) in 1981
- Date formed: 4 May 1979
- Date dissolved: 10 June 1983

People and organisations
- Monarch: Elizabeth II
- Prime Minister: Margaret Thatcher
- Prime Minister's history: Premiership of Margaret Thatcher
- Deputy Prime Minister: (Note: William Whitelaw did not officially hold the title of Deputy Prime Minister of the United Kingdom (Hennessy 2001, p. 405). He only served as Deputy Leader of the Conservative Party.)
- Total no. of members: 213 appointments
- Member party: Conservative Party
- Status in legislature: Majority
- Opposition cabinet: Callaghan shadow cabinet; Foot shadow cabinet
- Opposition party: Labour Party
- Opposition leader: James Callaghan (1979–1980); Michael Foot (1980–1983)

History
- Election: 1979 general election
- Outgoing election: 1983 general election
- Legislature terms: 48th UK Parliament
- Budgets: June 1979 budget; 1980 budget; 1981 budget; 1982 budget; 1983 budget
- Predecessor: Callaghan ministry
- Successor: Second Thatcher ministry

Margaret Thatcher was Prime Minister of the United Kingdom from 4 May 1979 to 28 November 1990, during which time she led a Conservative majority government. She was the first woman to hold that office. During her premiership, Thatcher moved to liberalise the British economy through deregulation, privatisation, and the promotion of entrepreneurialism.

This article details the first Thatcher ministry which she led at the invitation of Queen Elizabeth II from 1979 to 1983.

== Formation ==
Following the vote of no confidence against the Labour government and prime minister James Callaghan on 28 March 1979, a general election was called for 3 May 1979. The Winter of Discontent had seen the Labour government's popularity slump during the previous four months, and the opinion polls all pointed towards a Conservative victory.

The Conservatives won the election with a majority of 43 seats and a vote share of 43.9%, the lowest winning vote share of a party since WW2. This victory led to Margaret Thatcher becoming the United Kingdom's first female prime minister.

Thatcher inherited some of the worst economic statistics of postwar Britain. The nation was still feeling the effects of the numerous strikes during the recent Winter of Discontent. Inflation had recently topped twenty per cent, and unemployment was in excess of 1.5 million for the first time since the 1930s.

Thatcher's monetarist and deflationary economic policies saw a cut in the inflation rate from a high of 22 per cent in May 1980 to just over 13 per cent by January 1981, and by June 1983 it had fallen to a 15-year low of 4.9 per cent.

Decreasing the public sector borrowing requirement as a share of GDP was a part of the medium term financial strategy at the beginning of the first Thatcher ministry. It was brought down from around five per cent during the 1978–1979 period to around half of this figure during the 1982–1983 period.

Public expenditure as a share of GDP increased at around 1.5 per cent per year during the 1979–1983 period, despite the target being a reduction of one per cent, per year. This increase in spending was mostly driven by larger expenditures in social security programs such as unemployment benefits, industrial support, and increased lending to nationalized industries; defense spending did not go up considerably during the Falklands War.

Long-term unemployment increased considerably during this period: almost one third of the unemployed had been without a job for more than one year. The manufacturing industry was considerably affected during the first Thatcher government: employment in this sector decreased by almost 20 per cent between 1979 and 1982. This decrease drove almost all of the drop in employment for this period.

Productivity started seeing considerable growth during the 1979–1982 period in some industries. Total factor productivity growth during these years was 13.9 per cent in the metal manufacture industry, 6.6 per cent in motor vehicle manufacture, 7.1 per cent in ship and aircraft manufacture, and 7.5 per cent in agriculture.

Income distribution widened considerably during Thatcher's ministry. During the 1979–1986 period, real income per capita fell for the two lower quintiles by four and 12 per cent respectively; but for the top three quintiles, it went up by 24, 11, and 10 per cent, respectively.

Thatcher also oversaw union reforms which saw strikes at their lowest for thirty years by 1983. However, her economic policies also resulted in the loss of much of Britain's heavy industry. Coal pits, steel plants, machine-tools and shipyards were particularly hard hit, most of all in Scotland, Northern Ireland and the north of England. By 1983, unemployment had reached 3.2 million, although economic growth was now re-established following the recession of 1980 and 1981.

The Labour opposition, which changed leader from James Callaghan to Michael Foot in 1980, was in no position to exploit the situation and mount a threat to the Conservative government's power. The change of leader saw the party shift dramatically to the left, and in 1981 a host of disenchanted Labour MPs formed the breakaway Social Democratic Party. The new party swiftly formed an alliance with the Liberals with a view to forming a coalition government at the next election. Roy Jenkins, leader of the SDP, worked in conjunction with Liberal leader David Steel with the goal of forming a coalition government at the next general election. For a while, opinion polls suggested that this could happen, with support for the Alliance peaking at 50 per cent in late 1981, with both the Tories and Labour faring dismally.

However, when the Falkland Islands (a British dependent territory in the South Atlantic) were seized by Argentine forces in March 1982, Thatcher was swift to mount a military response. The subsequent ten-week Falklands War concluded with a British victory on 14 June when the Argentines surrendered. The success of this military campaign saw a rapid turnaround in voter sentiment, with the Tory government firmly in the lead in all major opinion polls by the summer of 1982. A Conservative victory at the next election appeared inevitable, although it appeared far from clear whether it would be Labour or the Alliance who formed the next opposition.

== Fate ==
Thatcher had the option of waiting until May 1984 before calling a general election, but the opinion polls remained in her favour as 1983 dawned; she called a general election for 9 June. With all the pollsters pointing towards a Conservative majority, the most interesting outcome of the election was the guessing game as to whether it would be Labour or the Alliance who formed the next opposition.

In the event, the Conservatives were re-elected with a 144-seat majority. The election was an unmitigated disaster for Labour, who polled a mere 27.6 per cent of the vote and were left with just 209 MPs in the new parliament. The Alliance came close to Labour in terms of votes with 25.4 per cent of the electorate voting for them, but won a mere 23 seats.

== Cabinets ==
=== May 1979 to September 1981 ===
Office	Name
Prime Minister; First Lord of the Treasury; Minister for the Civil Service	Margaret Thatcher
Secretary of State for the Home Department; Deputy Prime Minister	William Whitelaw
Leader of the House of Lords; Lord President of the Council	Christopher Soames, Baron Soames
Lord High Chancellor of Great Britain	Quintin Hogg, Baron Hailsham of St Marylebone
Chancellor of the Exchequer	Sir Geoffrey Howe
Secretary of State for Foreign and Commonwealth Affairs	Peter Carington, 6th Baron Carrington
Lord Keeper of the Privy Seal	Sir Ian Gilmour, 3rd Baronet
Chief Secretary to the Treasury	John Biffen
Minister of Agriculture, Fisheries and Food	Peter Walker
Leader of the House of Commons; Minister of State for the Arts; Chancellor of the Duchy of Lancaster	Norman St John-Stevas
Secretary of State for Defence	Francis Pym
Secretary of State for Education and Science	Mark Carlisle
Secretary of State for Employment	James Prior
Secretary of State for Energy	David Howell
Secretary of State for the Environment	Michael Heseltine
Secretary of State for Social Services	Patrick Jenkin
Secretary of State for Industry	Keith Joseph
Paymaster General	Angus Maude
Secretary of State for Trade; President of the Board of Trade	John Nott
Secretary of State for Northern Ireland	Humphrey Atkins
Secretary of State for Scotland	George Younger
Secretary of State for Wales	Nicholas Edwards

==== Changes ====
- January 1981 –
  - Francis Pym succeeded Norman St John-Stevas as Chancellor of the Duchy of Lancaster and Leader of the House of Commons. Pym succeeded Angus Maude as Paymaster-General.
  - John Nott succeeded Francis Pym as Secretary of State for Defence. John Biffen succeeded Nott as Secretary of State for Trade and President of the Board of Trade.
  - Leon Brittan succeeded John Biffen as Chief Secretary to the Treasury.
  - Norman St John-Stevas resigned as Minister for the Arts. His successor was not in the Cabinet.
  - the post of Secretary of State for Transport was brought into the Cabinet and Norman Fowler was given the post.

=== September 1981 to June 1983 ===
In September 1981, a substantial reshuffle took place.

Office	Name
Prime Minister; First Lord of the Treasury; Minister for the Civil Service	Margaret Thatcher
Secretary of State for the Home Department; Deputy Prime Minister	William Whitelaw
Leader of the House of Commons; Lord President of the Council	Francis Pym
Lord High Chancellor of Great Britain	Quintin Hogg, Baron Hailsham of St Marylebone
Chancellor of the Exchequer	Sir Geoffrey Howe
Secretary of State for Foreign and Commonwealth Affairs	Peter Carrington, 6th Baron Carrington
Lord Keeper of the Privy Seal	Humphrey Atkins
Chief Secretary to the Treasury	Leon Brittan
Minister of Agriculture, Fisheries and Food	Peter Walker
Secretary of State for Defence	John Nott
Secretary of State for Education and Science	Keith Joseph
Secretary of State for Employment	Norman Tebbit
Secretary of State for Energy	Nigel Lawson
Secretary of State for the Environment	Michael Heseltine
Secretary of State for Social Services	Norman Fowler
Secretary of State for Industry	Patrick Jenkin
Leader of the House of Lords; Chancellor of the Duchy of Lancaster	Janet Young, Baroness Young
Paymaster General	Cecil Parkinson
Secretary of State for Trade; President of the Board of Trade	John Biffen
Secretary of State for Transport	David Howell
Secretary of State for Northern Ireland	James Prior
Secretary of State for Scotland	George Younger
Secretary of State for Wales	Nicholas Edwards

==== Changes ====
- April 1982 –
  - Francis Pym succeeded Lord Carrington as Foreign Secretary. John Biffen succeeded Pym as Lord President of the Council.
  - Baroness Young succeeded Humphrey Atkins as Lord Keeper of the Privy Seal. Cecil Parkinson succeeded Young as Chancellor of the Duchy of Lancaster.
  - Lord Cockfield succeeded John Biffen as Secretary of State for Trade.
- January 1983 – Michael Heseltine succeeded John Nott as Secretary of State for Defence. Tom King succeeded Heseltine as Secretary of State for the Environment.

== List of ministers ==
Members of the Cabinet are in bold face.

Office	Name	Dates	Notes
Prime Minister; First Lord of the Treasury; Minister for the Civil Service	**Margaret Thatcher**	4 May 1979	
Deputy Prime Minister	**William Whitelaw, 1st Viscount Whitelaw**	4 May 1979	also Home Secretary
Minister of State for the Civil Service Department	Paul Channon	7 May 1979 – 5 January 1981	
Minister of State for the Civil Service Department	Barney Hayhoe	5 January 1981 – 12 November 1981	
Lord High Chancellor of Great Britain	**Quintin Hogg, Baron Hailsham of St Marylebone**	5 May 1979	
Leader of the House of Commons	**Norman St John Stevas**	5 May 1979	also Chancellor of the Duchy of Lancaster
Leader of the House of Commons	**Francis Pym**	6 January 1981	also Chancellor of the Duchy of Lancaster January – September 1981, Lord President of the Council from September 1981 – April 1982
Leader of the House of Commons	**John Biffen**	5 April 1982	also Lord President of the Council
Leader of the House of Lords	**Christopher Soames, Baron Soames**	5 May 1979	also Lord President of the Council
Leader of the House of Lords	**Janet Young, Baroness Young**	14 September 1981	also Chancellor of the Duchy of Lancaster from September 1981 – April 1982, Lord Privy Seal from April 1982
Lord President of the Council	**Christopher Soames, Baron Soames**	5 May 1979	also Leader of the House of Lords
Lord President of the Council	**Francis Pym**	14 September 1981	also Leader of the House of Commons
Lord President of the Council	**John Biffen**	5 April 1982	also Leader of the House of Commons
Lord Keeper of the Privy Seal	**Sir Ian Gilmour, 3rd Baronet**	5 May 1979	
Lord Keeper of the Privy Seal	**Humphrey Atkins**	14 September 1981	
Lord Keeper of the Privy Seal	**Janet Young, Baroness Young**	6 April 1982	also Leader of the House of Lords
Chancellor of the Exchequer	**Sir Geoffrey Howe**	5 May 1979	
Chief Secretary to the Treasury	**John Biffen**	5 May 1979	
Chief Secretary to the Treasury	**Leon Brittan**	5 January 1981	
Minister of State for Treasury	Peter Rees	6 May 1979 – 14 September 1981	
Minister of State for Treasury	Arthur Cockfield, Baron Cockfield	6 May 1979 – 6 April 1982	
Minister of State for Treasury	Jock Bruce-Gardyne	15 September 1981 – 11 November 1981	
Minister of State for Treasury	Barney Hayhoe	11 November 1981	
Minister of State for Treasury	John Wakeham	6 April 1982	
Parliamentary Secretary to the Treasury	Michael Jopling	5 May 1979	
Financial Secretary to the Treasury	Nigel Lawson	6 May 1979	
Financial Secretary to the Treasury	Nicholas Ridley	30 September 1981	
Economic Secretary to the Treasury	Jock Bruce-Gardyne	11 November 1981	
Lords Commissioners of the Treasury	John MacGregor	7 May 1979 – 5 January 1981	
Lords Commissioners of the Treasury	Peter Morrison	7 May 1979 – 5 January 1981	
Lords Commissioners of the Treasury	Lord James Douglas-Hamilton	7 May 1979 – 1 October 1981	
Lords Commissioners of the Treasury	Carol Mather	7 May 1979 – 1 October 1981	
Lords Commissioners of the Treasury	David Waddington	16 May 1979 – 5 January 1981	
Lords Commissioners of the Treasury	John Wakeham	9 January 1981 – 15 September 1981	
Lords Commissioners of the Treasury	Robert Boscawen	9 January 1981 – 17 February 1983	
Lords Commissioners of the Treasury	John Cope	9 January 1981 – 13 June 1983	
Lords Commissioners of the Treasury	Tony Newton	1 October 1981 – 5 March 1982	
Lords Commissioners of the Treasury	John Gummer	1 October 1981 – 6 January 1983	
Lords Commissioners of the Treasury	Peter Brooke	1 October 1981 – 13 June 1983	
Lords Commissioners of the Treasury	Alastair Goodlad	16 February 1982	
Lords Commissioners of the Treasury	Donald Thompson	14 January 1983	
Lords Commissioners of the Treasury	David Hunt	23 February 1983	
Assistant Whips	Robert Boscawen	May 1979 -January 1981	
Assistant Whips	John Cope	May 1979 – January 1981	
Assistant Whips	Tony Newton	May 1979 – September 1981	
Assistant Whips	John Wakeham	May 1979 – January 1981	
Assistant Whips	Peter Brooke	May 1979 – September 1981	
Assistant Whips	John Gummer	January 1981 – September 1981	
Assistant Whips	Alastair Goodlad	January 1981 – February 1982	
Assistant Whips	Donald Thompson	January 1981 – January 1983	
Assistant Whips	Nicholas Budgen	September 1981 – May 1982	
Assistant Whips	David Hunt	September 1981 – February 1983	
Assistant Whips	Ian Lang	September 1981 – June 1983	
Assistant Whips	Tristan Garel-Jones	March 1982 – June 1983	
Assistant Whips	Archie Hamilton	May 1982 – October 1984	
Assistant Whips	John Major	January 1983 – June 1983	
Assistant Whips	Douglas Hogg	February 1983 – June 1983	
Foreign Secretary	**Peter Carrington, 6th Baron Carrington**	5 May 1979	
Foreign Secretary	**Francis Pym**	5 April 1982	
Minister of State for Foreign and Commonwealth Affairs	Peter Blaker	5 May 1979 – 29 May 1981	
Minister of State for Foreign and Commonwealth Affairs	Nicholas Ridley	6 May 1979 – 29 September 1981	
Minister of State for Foreign and Commonwealth Affairs	Douglas Hurd	6 May 1979 – 11 June 1983	Minister of State for Europe
Minister of State for Foreign and Commonwealth Affairs	Richard Luce	30 September 1981 – 5 April 1982	
Minister of State for Foreign and Commonwealth Affairs	Cranley Onslow	5 April 1982 – 13 June 1983	
Minister of State for Foreign and Commonwealth Affairs	John Ganzoni, 2nd Baron Belstead	5 April 1982 – 13 June 1983	
Minister of State for Foreign and Commonwealth Affairs	Timothy Raison	6 January 1983	also Minister of Overseas Development
Parliamentary Under-Secretary of State for Foreign and Commonwealth Affairs	Richard Luce	6 May 1979	
Parliamentary Under-Secretary of State for Foreign and Commonwealth Affairs	David Trefgarne, 2nd Baron Trefgarne	14 September 1981	
Parliamentary Under-Secretary of State for Foreign and Commonwealth Affairs	Malcolm Rifkind	6 April 1982	
Minister for Overseas Development	Neil Marten	6 May 1979	
Minister for Overseas Development	Timothy Raison	6 January 1983	
Home Secretary	**William Whitelaw**	5 May 1979	also Deputy Leader of the Conservative Party
Minister of State for Home Affairs	Leon Brittan	6 May 1979 – 5 January 1981	
Minister of State for Home Affairs	Timothy Raison	6 May 1979 – 6 January 1983	Minister of State for Immigration
Minister of State for Home Affairs	Patrick Mayhew	5 January 1981 – 13 June 1983	
Minister of State for Home Affairs	David Waddington	6 January 1983	Minister of State for Immigration
Parliamentary Under-Secretary of State for Home Affairs	John Ganzoni, 2nd Baron Belstead	7 May 1979 – 6 April 1982	
Parliamentary Under-Secretary of State for Home Affairs	Rodney Elton, 2nd Baron Elton	6 April 1982 – 13 June 1983	
Parliamentary Under-Secretary of State for Home Affairs	David Mellor	6 January 1983	
Minister of Agriculture, Fisheries and Food	**Peter Walker**	5 May 1979	
Minister of State for Agriculture, Fisheries and Food	Robert Shirley, 13th Earl Ferrers	7 May 1979 – 13 June 1983	
Minister of State for Agriculture, Fisheries and Food	Alick Buchanan-Smith	7 May 1979 – 13 June 1983	
Parliamentary Under-Secretary of State for Agriculture, Fisheries and Food	Jerry Wiggin	7 May 1979 – 29 September 1981	
Parliamentary Under-Secretary of State for Agriculture, Fisheries and Food	Peggy Fenner	14 September 1981 – 13 June 1983	
Minister for the Arts	**Norman St John-Stevas**	5 May 1979	also Leader of the House of Commons
Minister for the Arts	Paul Channon	5 January 1981	
Secretary of State for Defence	**Francis Pym**	5 May 1979	
Secretary of State for Defence	**John Nott**	5 January 1981	
Secretary of State for Defence	**Michael Heseltine**	8 January 1983	
Minister of State for Defence	Euan Howard, 4th Baron Strathcona and Mount Royal	6 May 1979 – 5 January 1981	
Minister of State for Defence	Thomas Trenchard, 2nd Viscount Trenchard	5 January 1981 – 29 May 1981	Office abolished 29 May 1981; Trenchard appointed Minister of State for Defence Procurement
Minister of State for the Armed Forces	Peter Blaker	29 May 1981	
Minister of State for Defence Procurement	Thomas Trenchard, 2nd Viscount Trenchard	29 May 1981	
Minister of State for Defence Procurement	Geoffrey Pattie	6 January 1983	
Parliamentary Under-Secretary of State for the Army	Barney Hayhoe	6 May 1979 – 5 January 1981	
Parliamentary Under-Secretary of State for the Army	Philip Goodhart	5 January 1981 – 19 May 1981	Office abolished 29 May 1981; Goodhart appointed Under-Secretary of State for the Armed Forces
Under-Secretary of State for the Navy	Keith Speed	6 May 1979 – 18 May 1981	Office abolished 29 May 1981
Under-Secretary of State for the Air Force	Geoffrey Pattie	6 May 1979 – 29 May 1981	Office abolished 29 May 1981; Pattie appointed Under-Secretary of State for Defence Procurement
Under-Secretary of State for the Armed Forces	Philip Goodhart	29 May 1981 – 30 September 1981	
Under-Secretary of State for the Armed Forces	Jerry Wiggin	15 September 1981 – 11 June 1983	
Under-Secretary of State for Defence Procurement	Geoffrey Pattie	29 May 1981 – 6 January 1983	
Under-Secretary of State for Defence Procurement	Ian Stewart	6 January 1983	
Secretary of State for Education	**Mark Carlisle**	5 May 1979	
Secretary of State for Education	**Sir Keith Joseph**	14 September 1981	
Minister of State, Education and Science	Janet Young, Baroness Young	7 May 1979 – 14 September 1981	
Minister of State, Education and Science	Paul Channon	5 January 1981 – 13 June 1983	
Under-Secretary of State, Education and Science	Rhodes Boyson	7 May 1979 – 13 June 1983	
Under-Secretary of State, Education and Science	Neil Macfarlane	7 May 1979 – 15 September 1981	
Under-Secretary of State, Education and Science	Bill Shelton	15 September 1981 – 13 June 1983	
Under-Secretary of State, Education and Science	William Waldegrave	15 September 1981 – 13 June 1983	
Secretary of State for Employment	**James Prior**	5 May 1979	
Secretary of State for Employment	**Norman Tebbit**	14 September 1981	
Minister of State, Employment	Grey Gowrie, 2nd Earl of Gowrie	7 May 1979 – 15 September 1981	
Minister of State, Employment	Michael Alison	15 September 1981 – 13 June 1983	
Under-Secretary of State, Employment	Jim Lester	7 May 1979 – 5 January 1981	
Under-Secretary of State, Employment	Patrick Mayhew	7 May 1979 – 5 January 1981	
Under-Secretary of State, Employment	David Waddington	5 January 1981 – 6 January 1983	
Under-Secretary of State, Employment	Peter Morrison	5 January 1981 – 13 June 1983	
Under-Secretary of State, Employment	John Gummer	6 January 1983	
Secretary of State for Energy	**David Howell**	5 May 1979	
Secretary of State for Energy	**Nigel Lawson**	14 September 1981	
Minister of State, Energy	Hamish Gray	7 May 1979 – 13 June 1983	
Under-Secretary of State, Energy	Norman Lamont	7 May 1979 – 5 September 1981	
Under-Secretary of State, Energy	John Moore	7 May 1979 – 13 June 1983	
Under-Secretary of State, Energy	David Mellor	15 September 1981 – 6 January 1983	
Under-Secretary of State, Energy	Nicholas Eden, 2nd Earl of Avon	6 January 1983	
Secretary of State for the Environment	**Michael Heseltine**	5 May 1979	
Secretary of State for the Environment	**Tom King**	6 January 1983	
Minister of State for Local Government	Tom King	6 May 1979	
Minister of State for Local Government	Irwin Bellow, Baron Bellwin	6 January 1983	
Minister of State for Housing	John Stanley	7 May 1979	
Under-Secretary of State for Sport	Hector Monro	7 May 1979 – 30 September 1981	
Under-Secretary of State for Sport	Neil Macfarlane	15 September 1981	
Under-Secretary of State, Environment	Marcus Fox	7 May 1979 – 5 January 1981	
Under-Secretary of State, Environment	Geoffrey Finsberg	7 May 1979 – 15 September 1981	
Under-Secretary of State, Environment	Irwin Bellow, Baron Bellwin	7 May 1979 – 6 January 1983	
Under-Secretary of State, Environment	Giles Shaw	5 January 1981 – 13 June 1983	
Under-Secretary of State, Environment	Sir George Young, 6th Baronet	15 September 1981	
Secretary of State for Social Services	**Patrick Jenkin**	5 May 1979	
Secretary of State for Social Services	**Norman Fowler**	14 September 1981	
Minister of State, Health	Gerard Vaughan	7 May 1979	
Minister of State, Health	Kenneth Clarke	5 March 1982	
Under-Secretary of State, Health and Social Security	Sir George Young, 6th Baronet	7 May 1979 – 15 September 1981	
Under-Secretary of State, Health and Social Security	Lynda Chalker	7 May 1979 – 5 March 1982	
Under-Secretary of State, Health and Social Security	Geoffrey Finsberg	15 September 1981 – 14 June 1983	
Under-Secretary of State, Health and Social Security	Rodney Elton, 2nd Baron Elton	15 September 1981 – 6 April 1982	
Under-Secretary of State, Health and Social Security	Tony Newton	5 March 1982	
Under-Secretary of State, Health and Social Security	David Trefgarne, 2nd Baron Trefgarne	6 April 1982 – 14 June 1983	
Minister of State for Social Security	Reginald Prentice	7 May 1979 – 5 January 1981	
Minister of State for Social Security	Hugh Rossi	5 January 1981 – 12 June 1983	
Secretary of State for Industry	**Sir Keith Joseph, 2nd Baronet**	7 May 1979	
Secretary of State for Industry	**Patrick Jenkin**	14 September 1981	Merged with the Office of Trade 12 June 1983
Minister of State, Industry	Adam Butler	6 May 1979 – 5 January 1981	
Minister of State, Industry	Thomas Trenchard, 2nd Viscount Trenchard	6 May 1979 – 5 January 1981	
Minister of State, Industry	Norman Tebbit	5 January 1981 – 14 September 1981	
Minister of State, Industry	Norman Lamont	14 September 1981 – 12 June 1983	
Minister of State, Industry and Information Technology	Kenneth Baker	5 January 1981	
Under-Secretary of State, Industry	David Mitchell	6 May 1979 – 5 January 1981	
Under-Secretary of State, Industry	Michael Marshall	6 May 1979 – 15 September 1981	
Under-Secretary of State, Industry	John MacGregor	5 January 1981 – 12 June 1983	
Under-Secretary of State, Industry	John Wakeham	15 September 1981 – 6 April 1982	
Under-Secretary of State, Industry	John Butcher	6 April 1982 – 12 June 1983	
Chancellor of the Duchy of Lancaster	**Norman St John-Stevas**	5 May 1979	also Leader of the House of Commons
Chancellor of the Duchy of Lancaster	**Francis Pym**	5 January 1981	also Leader of the House of Commons
Chancellor of the Duchy of Lancaster	**Janet Young, Baroness Young**	14 September 1981	also Leader of the House of Lords
Chancellor of the Duchy of Lancaster	**Cecil Parkinson**	6 April 1982	
Secretary of State for Northern Ireland	**Humphrey Atkins**	5 May 1979	
Secretary of State for Northern Ireland	**James Prior**	14 September 1981	
Minister of State, Northern Ireland	Michael Alison	7 May 1979 – 15 September 1981	
Minister of State, Northern Ireland	Hugh Rossi	7 May 1979 – 5 January 1981	
Minister of State, Northern Ireland	Adam Butler	5 January 1981 – 10 June 1983	
Minister of State, Northern Ireland	Grey Ruthven, 2nd Earl of Gowrie	15 September 1981 – 10 June 1983	
Under-Secretary of State, Northern Ireland	Rodney Elton, 2nd Baron Elton	7 May 1979 – 15 September 1981	
Under-Secretary of State, Northern Ireland	Philip Goodhart	7 May 1979 – 5 January 1981	
Under-Secretary of State, Northern Ireland	Giles Shaw	7 May 1979 – 5 January 1981	
Under-Secretary of State, Northern Ireland	David Mitchell	5 January 1981 – 13 June 1983	
Under-Secretary of State, Northern Ireland	John Patten	5 January 1981 – 13 June 1983	
Under-Secretary of State, Northern Ireland	Nicholas Scott	15 September 1981 – June 1983	
Paymaster General	**Angus Maude**	5 May 1979	
Paymaster General	**Francis Pym**	5 January 1981	
Paymaster General	**Cecil Parkinson**	14 September 1981	
Secretary of State for Scotland	**George Younger**	5 May 1979	
Minister of State for Scotland	William Murray, 8th Earl of Mansfield	7 May 1979 – 13 June 1983	
Under-Secretary of State for Scotland	Alexander Fletcher	7 May 1979 – 14 June 1983	
Under-Secretary of State for Scotland	Russell Fairgrieve	7 May 1979 – 15 September 1981	
Under-Secretary of State for Scotland	Malcolm Rifkind	7 May 1979 – 6 April 1982	
Under-Secretary of State for Scotland	Allan Stewart	15 September 1981 – June 1983	
Under-Secretary of State for Scotland	John MacKay	6 April 1982 – June 1983	
Secretary of State for Trade	**John Nott**	5 May 1979	
Secretary of State for Trade	**John Biffen**	5 January 1981	
Secretary of State for Trade	**Arthur Cockfield, Baron Cockfield**	6 April 1982	
Minister of State for Consumer Affairs (under the Department of Trade and Industry)	Sally Oppenheim-Barnes	5 May 1979	
Minister of State for Consumer Affairs (under the Department of Trade and Industry)	Gerard Vaughan	5 March 1982	
Minister for Trade	Cecil Parkinson	7 May 1979	
Minister for Trade	Peter Rees	14 September 1981	
Under-Secretary of State for Trade	Norman Tebbit	5 May 1979 – 5 January 1981	
Under-Secretary of State for Trade	Reginald Eyre	7 May 1979 – 5 March 1982	
Under-Secretary of State for Trade	David Trefgarne, 2nd Baron Trefgarne	5 January 1981 – 15 September 1981	
Under-Secretary of State for Trade	Iain Sproat	15 September 1981 – 12 June 1983	
Minister of Transport	Norman Fowler	11 May 1979 – 5 January 1981	became Secretary of State for Transport
Secretary of State for Transport	**Norman Fowler**	5 January 1981	
Secretary of State for Transport	**David Howell**	14 September 1981	
Parliamentary Secretary for Transport	Kenneth Clarke	7 May 1979 – 5 January 1981	became Under-Secretary of State for Transport
Under-Secretary of State for Transport	Kenneth Clarke	5 January 1981 – 5 March 1982	
Under-Secretary of State for Transport	Lynda Chalker	5 March 1982 – June 1983	
Under-Secretary of State for Transport	Reginald Eyre	5 March 1982 – 11 June 1983	
Secretary of State for Wales	**Nicholas Edwards**	5 May 1979	
Minister of State for Wales	John Stradling Thomas	17 February 1983 – June 1983	
Under-Secretary of State for Wales	Michael Roberts	7 May 1979 – 10 February 1983	
Under-Secretary of State for Wales	Wyn Roberts	7 May 1979 – June 1983	
Attorney General	Michael Havers	5 May 1979	
Solicitor General	Sir Ian Percival	5 May 1979	
Lord Advocate	James Mackay, Baron Mackay of Clashfern	5 May 1979	
Solicitor General for Scotland	Nicholas Fairbairn	7 May 1979	
Solicitor General for Scotland	Peter Fraser	28 January 1982	
Treasurer of the Household	John Stradling Thomas	6 May 1979	
Treasurer of the Household	Anthony Berry	17 February 1983	
Comptroller of the Household	Spencer Le Marchant	7 May 1979	
Comptroller of the Household	Anthony Berry	30 September 1981	
Comptroller of the Household	Carol Mather	17 February 1983	
Vice-Chamberlain of the Household	Anthony Berry	7 May 1979	
Vice-Chamberlain of the Household	Carol Mather	30 September 1981	
Vice-Chamberlain of the Household	Robert Boscawen	17 February 1983	
Captain of the Gentlemen-at-Arms; (Chief Whip in the House of Lords)	Bertram Bowyer, 2nd Baron Denham	6 May 1979	
Captain of the Yeomen of the Guard; (Deputy Whip, House of Lords)	Richard Hill, 7th Baron Sandys	6 May 1979	
Captain of the Yeomen of the Guard; (Deputy Whip, House of Lords)	David Cunliffe-Lister, 2nd Earl of Swinton	20 October 1982	
Lords-in-Waiting; (Junior Whips, House of Lords)	Richard Long, 4th Viscount Long	9 May 1979 – June 1983	
Lords-in-Waiting; (Junior Whips, House of Lords)	Charles Stourton, 26th Baron Mowbray	9 May 1979 – 22 September 1980	
Lords-in-Waiting; (Junior Whips, House of Lords)	Charles Lyell, 3rd Baron Lyell	9 May 1979 – June 1983	
Lords-in-Waiting; (Junior Whips, House of Lords)	Charles Cockayne, 2nd Baron Cullen of Ashbourne	9 May 1979 – 27 May 1982	
Lords-in-Waiting; (Junior Whips, House of Lords)	David Trefgarne, 2nd Baron Trefgarne	9 May 1979 – 5 January 1981	
Lords-in-Waiting; (Junior Whips, House of Lords)	Nicholas Eden, 2nd Earl of Avon	22 September 1980 – 6 January 1983	
Lords-in-Waiting; (Junior Whips, House of Lords)	Roger Bootle-Wilbraham, 7th Baron Skelmersdale	9 January 1981 – June 1983	
Lords-in-Waiting; (Junior Whips, House of Lords)	Simon Arthur, 4th Baron Glenarthur	27 May 1982 – 10 June 1983	
Lords-in-Waiting; (Junior Whips, House of Lords)	Michael Lucas, 2nd Baron Lucas of Chilworth	6 January 1983 – June 1983	

== Notes ==
Preceded by Callaghan ministry	Government of the United Kingdom; 1979–1983	Succeeded by Second Thatcher ministry
