= 1982 United Kingdom budget =

- Presented: 9 March 1982
- Parliament: 48th
- Party: Conservative Party
- Chancellor: Geoffrey Howe

The 1982 United Kingdom budget was delivered by Geoffrey Howe, the Chancellor of the Exchequer, to the House of Commons on 9 March 1982. This was the fourth budget to be presented by Howe during his tenure as chancellor, and came at a time when unemployment had reached three million and the governing Conservative Party were unpopular in opinion polls. Howe painted a bleak picture of the UK economy and outlined a fairly neutral budget. As well as drawing criticism from the Leader of the Opposition, the statement was also condemned by the Conservative MP Ian Gilmour, who had advocated a reflation package worth £5bn. The budget was presented a few weeks before the Falklands War, an event that was to revive the Conservatives' fortunes.

== Background ==
The 1981 budget had marked a significant turning point in the premiership of Margaret Thatcher as the Conservative Party abandoned the post-war consensus economics in favour of monetarism, and following Thatcher's battle, and eventual victory, over the moderate wing of the party. But the UK was in the midst of a recession, unemployment had risen to three million, and the Conservatives themselves were deeply unpopular in opinion polls. UK inflation had also reached 12% during 1981. Prior to the 1982 budget, the Conservative MP Ian Gilmour, a former minister in Thatcher's government, was advocating a reflation package worth around £5bn. (Note: about £19bn at 2021 prices)

== Overview ==
Howe described his budget as "a budget for industry and so a budget for jobs". He spoke at length about the UK's industrial decline, reflecting at one point that it was no longer the case that buses, cars and motorbikes were manufactured in the UK from British steel. Among the announcements were a 14% rise in income tax personal allowances, which were 2% above the 1981 rate of inflation, and a 1% reduction in the Employers' National Insurance surcharge to 1.5%. The weekly State Pension was increased by 11% to £32.85 (Note: about £123 at 2021 prices) for a single person, while child benefit was raised by 60p to £5.85 (Note: about £22 at 2021 prices) per week. Unemployment benefit was also increased. Road tax was raised by £10 to £80 per year, and there were excise duty increases on alcohol and cigarettes, with beer increased by 2p a pint, wine increased by 10p a bottle, spirits increased by 30p a litre, and 20 cigarettes increased by 5p.

== Reaction ==
The statement was criticised by Labour Party leader Michael Foot, the Leader of the Opposition, who felt that it showed "no proper understanding of the scale of the unemployment catastrophe".

The Conservative MP and former minister, Ian Gilmour, condemned the budget as "almost a neutral Budget", while other Conservative MPs were concerned it had done little to reduce the unemployment rate.

== Aftermath ==
The 1982 budget came a few weeks before the start of the Falklands War, and the conflict was to revive their political prospects. They would go on the following year to win the 1983 general election.
