= Gang of 25 =

Group of British Conservative Party backbench MPs

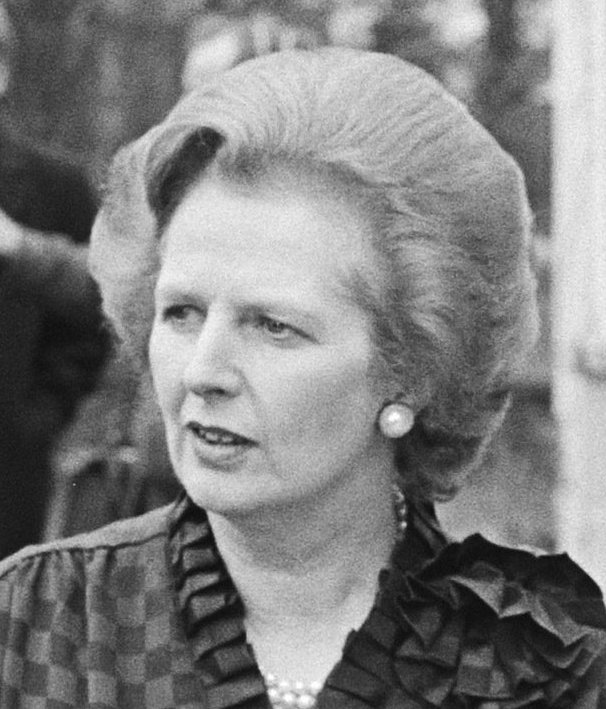
Thatcher in 1981

The Gang of 25 or the Group of 25 was a cohort of British Conservative Party backbench members of Parliament (MPs) that threatened to vote against prime minister Margaret Thatcher's 1981 Autumn Statement. The statement contained monetarist measures to control inflation. Similar measures introduced since 1979 had reduced inflation but caused job losses in the manufacturing sector.

The majority of the Gang put their names to a 25 November letter to Thatcher's Chief Whip, Michael Jopling, that stated they would vote against any disinflationary economic measures. A potential revolt by the Gang, plus twenty others suspected by Jopling, could negate the Conservatives' 45-seat majority and lead to the government being defeated in the House of Commons. The move came at a low point for Thatcher, following the Brixton and Toxteth riots and when the new SDP–Liberal Alliance was polling strongly. There were concerns that Stephen Dorrell would defect to the SDP, to join Christopher Brocklebank-Fowler, who had defected in March. A conciliatory approach was adopted, with meetings arranged between Gang members and senior government figures. Thatcher's parliamentary private secretary (PPS), Ian Gow, took over the response to the crisis, and he considered that Jopling was overstating the risk of a significant rebellion. The vote on the Autumn Statement passed on 8 December, with none of the Gang voting against the government, though 12 were among 14 Conservative MPs who abstained on the motion.

== Background ==
Thatcher, leader of the Conservative Party, came to power in the 1979 general election. She inherited a weak economy, just emerging from the Winter of Discontent. She considered inflation a key problem to be brought under control. Under her Labour predecessors, this had been as high as 25% (in consumer price index terms) in 1975, though it had fallen to 17% in 1979. The Conservative government attempted to reduce inflation by raising the Bank of England base rate of interest. This was increased from 12% at the 1979 election to 17% by the end of the year.

Interest rates were lowered to 12% by early 1981 as the high rate had increased the value of sterling, rendering exports more expensive. Chancellor of the Exchequer Geoffrey Howe's Spring 1981 budget was strongly monetarist and was intended to allow further interest rate reductions to weaken sterling and improve exports. However, the value of sterling depreciated quicker than expected, and the government was concerned that it would lead to excessive inflation. Howe raised interest rates by 2% in September and 2% in October to reach 16%. Around this time, the UK started to feel the effects of the early 1980s recession. Thatcher's economic policies, including monetarism and the elimination of government subsidies, led to the collapse of many manufacturing companies and an increase in unemployment.

== Threat from the SDP ==
By mid-1981, Thatcher's leadership was in her "darkest hour"; her popularity plunged after the April Brixton riot and the July Toxteth riots. The Conservative leadership were also worried about the effects of the June SDP–Liberal Alliance. The Social Democratic Party (SDP) had been formed in March 1981 by the Gang of Four and like-minded MPs who had defected from the Labour Party; they were joined soon after by Christopher Brocklebank-Fowler, who defected from the Conservatives during a debate on Howe's budget. Polling showed Thatcher's approval rating was the lowest recorded for any prime minister and below that even of the unpopular Labour Party leader Michael Foot. The Conservative Research Department conducted polls in late summer that showed the popularity of the Alliance might render the Conservatives a minority party, achieving just 16% of the vote (compared to the SDP–Liberal 40%) which would be their worst election performance for 100 years. The Conservative leadership feared the party was close to splitting.

Thatcher carried out a cabinet reshuffle in September; this was considered to be a purge of the so-called wets, Conservatives on the left of the party who tended to disagree with her economic policies. The party was shaken by SDP–Liberal by-election victories in the formerly Conservative-held seats of Croydon (22 October) and Crosby (26 November). The SDP at this time was actively courting moderate Conservative MPs to join their party in order to demonstrate their centrist appeal.

== Gang of 25 ==
Gang of 25 letter to Chief Whip
- Collective protest against govt economic policy
- Signatures in the order they appeared on the letter
- 25 November letter (released 2012)

On 25 November, Thatcher's Chief Whip, Michael Jopling, received a letter signed by 21 backbench MPs. The letter noted that the signatories had previously warned Jopling that they were in "fundamental disagreement with the government's economic analysis" but that they believed no action had been taken. The letter stated that collectively the signatories would "vote against any consequent measures presented to the House" if the effect of the Autumn Statement was to "deflate aggregate demand in the economy". The letter was typed on one side of paper, headed with the House of Commons logo. The text is just two sentences long, and the remainder of the page is taken up by the handwritten signatures of the MPs.

The letter came when Thatcher's economic policies did not show results, with factories closing, unemployment increasing, and inflation increasing. There were significant concerns that the 21 named MPs, as well as suspected Gang members Jim Lester, Richard Needham, Chris Patten and John Wheeler, would split from the party. Thatcher and her chief advisers nicknamed the group the "Gang of 25", after the SDP founders. One of the Gang was Ian Gilmour, a "wet" who had lost his position as Lord Privy Seal and Commons foreign affairs spokesman in the September reshuffle, and another was Keith Speed, a former navy minister who Thatcher had sacked in May for objecting to defence cuts.

There were particular concerns that Stephen Dorrell was on the verge of defecting to the SDP, but Jopling managed to extract an assurance from him that he would not do so. During a period described as "brutal in-fighting", the leadership adopted a conciliatory approach, inviting Dorrell, Patten and Tristan Garel-Jones to drinks with Thatcher in the House of Commons. Garel-Jones was not a member of the Gang of 25 but was a "wet" who held pro-European views; he had voted against the government in his 1979 maiden speech. The measures had little effect and, on 4 December, Jopling wrote to Thatcher warning her that up to 20 other MPs were considering abstaining on a key vote on the Autumn Statement. He stated, "We have got far more dissidents than I expected, and some are very unhappy indeed … We are facing a very serious situation which we must discuss". The Conservative majority in the House was only 45, so this number of rebels would be problematic to the government.

Thatcher's PPS, Ian Gow, took charge of the situation and arranged for each of the potential dissidents to meet with Howe and the Chief Secretary to the Treasury, Leon Brittan. Gow considered that Jopling was overstating the potential for a rebellion; he wrote to Thatcher that Jopling, "though an outstanding chief whip, does not share our conviction. Like the original 25, he, in his heart, favours reflation and foresees the deepest difficulty for our party if the budget is not reflationary. I take the opposite view. In my opinion, the gravest danger for our country is if we follow our predecessors, and lose our nerve".

The critical vote on the Autumn Statement came on 8 December. None of the Gang of 25 voted against the government though 14 Conservative MPs abstained, including 12 of the Gang. The government won the vote by 307 votes to 265, and it, and the party, survived. At the end of the year, Gow wrote an emotional letter to Thatcher reassuring her that the views of the Gang of 25 did not reflect those of the party or the nation as a whole. He called her a "giant amongst pygmies" but cautioned that "[w]hether that iron resolve will be sufficient, we do not know".

== Later events ==
Thatcher's interest rate policy was successful in reducing inflation; the inflation rate (as measured by CPI) fell to 12% in 1981 and around 5% in 1982. The government were able to gradually lower the interest rate to 9% by November 1982, though in that month, a sharp drop in the value of sterling prompted a temporary rise in rates. Thatcher's political popularity was restored following the April 1982 Argentine invasion of the Falkland Islands and the British victory in the subsequent Falklands War (which ended in June). She won an increased majority of 144 at the 1983 general election.

By the end of her first term, Thatcher's government had inflation stabilised; the CPI rate remained between 3% and 6% until the end of Thatcher's premiership. However, unemployment continued to rise, reaching 3 million in 1986 (it had been 1.3 million in 1979). Thatcher remained in office until 1990 when her anti-federalist stance on the European Economic Community and the failed implementation of the "poll tax" led to splits in the party and her resignation.

Jopling remained Chief Whip until June 1983 when he was appointed Minister of Agriculture, Fisheries and Food. Gow later rose to Minister of State for Housing and Minister of State for the Treasury in Thatcher's government before resigning in protest at the Anglo-Irish Agreement in 1985. He was later assassinated by the IRA in 1990. Thatcher recognised that Garel-Jones did not support her politics but appointed him a whip in 1982; he became highly respected by both sides of the House and rose through the Whips' Office to become Deputy Chief Whip in 1989, before Thatcher appointed him Minister of State for Europe in 1990. Despite their dissent some of the Gang were later appointed to government positions by Thatcher. Dorrell became an assistant whip in 1987, a full whip the following year and a junior health minister in 1990. He later joined the cabinet under John Major as Secretary of State for National Heritage and Health Secretary in the mid-1990s. Needham was appointed a junior Northern Ireland minister in 1985, holding the position beyond the end of Thatcher's premiership. Patten was appointed a junior Northern Ireland minister in 1983 and held a string of ministerial positions, reaching the cabinet in 1989 with appointment as Secretary of State for the Environment. In 1990, Thatcher arranged for Robert McCrindle to receive a knighthood for his service to the Conservative Party, even though he continued to be outspoken against some of her economic and social policies.

Gang of 25 member Sir Anthony Meyer unsuccessfully stood against Thatcher as a stalking horse in the 1989 Conservative Party leadership election. He was deselected ahead of the 1992 general election and in 2001 left the party to join the Liberal Democrats (the party formed in 1988 from the merger of the SDP and Liberal Party). Meyer joined fellow Gang member Hugh Dykes, who had defected to the Liberal Democrats in 1997. Dorrell also joined the party in 2019, having briefly been a Change UK member.

Despite significant fears at the time of its formation, the Gang of 25 is now less well remembered as a Conservative faction than the wets and the young, left-wing "blue chips". In 2012, the 25 November letter from the Gang was given to the Churchill Archives Centre, which holds a collection of archives on Thatcher.

== Members ==
Member list as recorded by the Margaret Thatcher Foundation. Members marked with an asterisk did not sign the letter of 25 November. Voting record from Hansard.

Voted with the government on 8 December
- David Crouch
- John Hunt
- Jim Lester*
- Robert McCrindle
- David Madel
- Anthony Meyer
- Richard Needham*
- Chris Patten*
- Alexander Pollock
- Keith Speed
- Cyril Townsend
- John Wheeler*
- Mark Wolfson
Abstained
- Patrick Cormack
- Julian Critchley
- Stephen Dorrell
- Hugh Dykes
- Ian Gilmour
- Robert Hicks
- David Knox
- Norman Miscampbell
- Charles Morrison
- Robin Squire
- Dennis Walters
- John Watson
