= Chertsey and Walton =

Parliamentary constituency in the United Kingdom, 1974–1997

Coordinates: 51.38°N 0.45°W

- Former county constituency for the House of Commons
- County: Surrey

1974–1997
- Seats: One
- Created from: Chertsey and Esher (parts)
- Replaced by: Runnymede and Weybridge and Esher and Walton (equally created from other seats)

Chertsey and Walton was a late 20th century parliamentary constituency in Surrey which returned one Member of Parliament (MP) to the House of Commons of the Parliament of the United Kingdom, elected by the first-past-the-post voting system.

== History ==
The main impetus for the seat's creation was growth in housing and population across the county to allow for a new seat, North West Surrey, which took most settlements, including the expanded towns of Camberley and Egham from the old Chertsey seat.

The constituency was created for the February 1974 general election from parts of the seats of Chertsey and Esher. It was abolished for the 1997 general election. Its electorate returned Geoffrey Pattie, a Conservative in February 1974 and at the five successive general elections applicable to the seat. Pattie served his time as an MP representing this seat, choosing to retire from the House in 1997.

As the voters of the forerunner constituencies had done in 1970, ultimately the electorates of the successor seats also elected Conservatives in 1997 and after.

== Boundaries ==
1974–1983: The Urban Districts of Chertsey, and Walton and Weybridge. These were as defined below under the 1974 reorganisation of local government.

1983–1997: The Borough of Runnymede wards of Addlestone Bourneside, Addlestone North, Addlestone St Paul's, Chertsey Meads, Chertsey St Ann's, Foxhills, New Haw, and Woodham, and the Borough of Elmbridge wards of Hersham North, Hersham South, Oatlands Park, St George's Hill, Walton Ambleside, Walton Central, Walton North, Walton South, Weybridge North, and Weybridge South.

== Members of Parliament ==
Election	Member	Party
Feb 1974	Sir Geoffrey Pattie (knighted 1997)	Conservative
1997	constituency abolished	

Geoffrey Pattie unsuccessfully contested Barking in 1970. From 1979 to 1986 he held a string of three defence procurement roles, followed by Minister for Industry, a role under Secretaries of State who ran the Department for Trade and Industry. He was vice-chairman of the Conservative Party in 1990. He was knighted in 1997 for his work in government.

== Election results ==
=== Elections in the 1970s ===
General election February 1974: Chertsey and Walton
Party	Candidate	Votes	%	±%
Conservative	Geoffrey Pattie	26,603	48.48	
Labour	NJ Brady	14,640	26.68	
Liberal	RH Insoll	13,626	24.83	
Majority		11,963	21.80	
Turnout		54,869	81.97	
Conservative win (new seat)				

General election October 1974: Chertsey and Walton
Party	Candidate	Votes	%	±%
Conservative	Geoffrey Pattie	25,151	50.69	
Labour	NJ Brady	14,847	29.92	
Liberal	T Robinson	9,194	18.53	
Independent	HJ Redgrave	424	0.85	New
Majority		10,304	20.77	
Turnout		49,616	73.48	
Conservative hold		Swing		

General election 1979: Chertsey and Walton
Party	Candidate	Votes	%	±%
Conservative	Geoffrey Pattie	25,810	49.04	
Liberal	A Sturgis	13,786	26.20	
Labour	SP O'Byrne	12,211	23.20	
National Front	M Gillibrand	819	1.56	New
Majority		12,024	22.86	
Turnout		52,626	76.55	
Conservative hold		Swing		

=== Elections in the 1980s ===
General election 1983: Chertsey and Walton
Party	Candidate	Votes	%	±%
Conservative	Geoffrey Pattie	29,679	58.33	
SDP	Richard de St. Croix	13,980	27.48	
Labour	David Green	6,902	13.57	
Freddie's Alternative Medicine	Fred Barrett	318	0.63	New
Majority		15,699	30.85	
Turnout		50,879	72.47	
Conservative hold		Swing		

General election 1987: Chertsey and Walton
Party	Candidate	Votes	%	±%
Conservative	Geoffrey Pattie	32,119	59.53	
SDP	Susan Stapely	14,650	27.15	
Labour	Harold Trace	7,185	13.32	
Majority		17,469	32.38	
Turnout		53,954	75.52	
Conservative hold		Swing		

=== Elections in the 1990s ===
General election 1992: Chertsey and Walton
Party	Candidate	Votes	%	±%
Conservative	Geoffrey Pattie	34,164	60.21	
Liberal Democrats	A Kremer	11,344	19.99	
Labour	Irene Hamilton	10,793	19.02	
Natural Law	S Bennell	444	0.78	New
Majority		22,820	40.22	
Turnout		56,745	80.53	
Conservative hold		Swing	+1.2	
