= Promo Parachutiste =

Promo Parachutiste is the selection course which Legionnaires intending to join 2ème REP undergo at Camp Raffalli in Calvi, Haute-Corse.

== Selection ==
Selection for 2e REP takes four weeks. The first two weeks are physical tests across terrain. Parachute training takes place at Camp Raffalli and runs for two weeks with a total of six jumps.

2e REP is the only regiment of the 11th Parachute Brigade which trains its paratroopers. The Legionnaires spend their parachute training in Calvi TAP within the walls of the regiment. All other regiments are trained at the École des troupes aéroportées (ETAP) in Pau.

Every new legionnaire has a password, assigned to a TAP instructor. This training is called the "promotion" or "the promo". It lasts for two to four weeks depending on aircraft availability for the jumping session. When "the promotion" lasts two weeks, the first is devoted to instruction on the ground and the second to instruction on jumping. If the training is extended for a week training is also included on combat formation.

After spending basic training with the 4th Foreign Regiment at Castelnaudary, recruits are assigned to regiments. Those who have the ability are grouped by an NCO from Calvi, who is responsible for their recovery. They are then taken on a ferry to Corsica and met by a bus at the island port.

Troops arrive at the barracks on Saturday morning. During the weekend they are still under the command of their monitor and they visit Camp Raffalli Legionnaires and paratroopers museum. During the first week of "promoting" the future legionnaire paratroopers still have to pass a series of physical tests, tests TAP:

=== TAP1 ===
- 15 pull ups minimum from a dead hang.
- 30 press ups
- 40 sit ups on an incline bench
- 30 squats
- 6m rope climb (arms and legs)

The emphasis in the legion is not in the gym, but in endurance. Long hard runs in the morning called 'footing' are the staple of the Legion training. Once placed in their companies, newly fledged parachutists are marched in full kit across the rugged terrain of the Corsican mountains to test their endurance.

=== TAP2 ===
- 1500 m - run in combat uniform with backpack of 11 kg in less than 9 minutes.
- 8000 m - run in combat uniform with backpack of 11 kg in less than 60 minutes.

=== TAP3 ===
- 10 m - underwater swim, holding breath, in combat uniform and helmet, immediately followed by;
- 90 m - surface swim in combat uniform and helmet .

First week - ground training: parachute equipment, exit procedures, landing procedures, emergency procedures.

Second week - flight phase: the first jump, second jump with opening of reserve parachute in flight, third through sixth jumps with increasing weapons and equipment. After completing the sixth jump, the soldier is issued his basic parachutist badge. The 2eme REP make the greatest number of jumps per year in the French Army. A legionnaire makes an average of 15 jumps per year.
