= Ian Taylor (British politician) =

British politician

Ian Taylor MBE
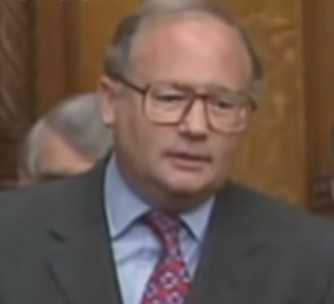
- Taylor asking Tony Blair's first Prime Minister's Question on 21 May 1997

Member of Parliament for Esher and Walton Esher (1987–1997)
- In office 11 June 1987 – 12 April 2010
- Preceded by: Carol Mather
- Succeeded by: Dominic Raab

Personal details
- Born: 18 April 1945 (age 81) Coventry, England
- Party: Independent (since 2019)
- Other political affiliations: Conservative (until 2019)
- Spouse: Carole Alport
- Education: Keele University

Ian Colin Taylor MBE (born 18 April 1945) is a British former Conservative Party politician who was the Member of Parliament (MP) for Esher from 1987 to 1997, and then for Esher and Walton from 1997 to 2010.

== Early life ==
He went to Whitley Abbey School, Abbey Road, Coventry. He was an accomplished sprinter and played rugby for Warwickshire Schools. He studied at Keele University, receiving a BA (Hons) in Economics, Politics and Modern History in 1967. He then did research at the London School of Economics. He chaired both the Federation of Conservative Students and the European Christian Democrat and Conservative Students 1967–70. In 1969, he joined Hill Samuel & Co. In 1971, he became the manager of the European Department at Stirling & Co. From 1975 to 1979, he joined a bank and lived in Paris. He was a Director for corporate finance of Mathercourt Securities Ltd from 1980 to 1991. He is an Associate of the UK Society of Investment Professionals and a Liveryman of the Worshipful Company of Information Technologists.

== Political career ==
Before being elected for Esher in 1987, Taylor had fought Coventry South East in February 1974, being beaten by Labour's Bill Wilson.

In the period in which he served Esher, the make-up of the seat was classified by economists as a 'natural home' for Taylor's party, and by historians as a safe seat, including its main successor, which he served from 1997 to 2010. Esher is part of the London Commuter Belt, and has seen strong Conservative majorities since the 1930s; Taylor won five elections before deciding to stand down at the 2010 general election to resume a business career.

He was during his first two terms appointed Parliamentary Private Secretary (PPS) at the Foreign Office, Department of Health and Cabinet Office. He served as Minister for Science and Technology for most of the Second Major ministry: from 1994 to 1997. He became a Shadow Minister for Northern Ireland in 1997, tracking the peace process. He resigned in November 1997 after disagreeing with William Hague's increasing euro-scepticism. See his chapter in 'The Conservatives in Crisis' by Mark Garnett (Editor), Philip Lynch (Editor).

He supported bids for leadership and main policies of Kenneth Clarke except in the 2005 Conservative leadership contest when he backed David Davis.

Taylor was the Chairman of the European Movement (2000–2005) and a member of the Britain in Europe Council until 2005. He chaired the Conservative Group for Europe 2007–11. His views became increasingly challenged by the Conservative Party. In December 2000 he comfortably overcame an attempted de-selection campaign by eurosceptics in his constituency.

He specialised in science and technology issues. He was Minister for Science, Technology and Space at the DTI during 1994–1997 in a Conservative Government. During this time he dealt with a wide variety of issues, including providing support for the next phase of the Large Hadron Collider at CERN, increasing awareness of the importance of access to the early internet revolution and coordinating Government support for the Roslin Institute which led to the Cloning of Dolly the Sheep and the creation of the Human Genetics Advisory Commission] in February 1997. See this background interview on his technology policies: https://archivesit.org.uk/interviews/ian-taylor-mbe/

He also published in January 1997 the first major Ministerial policy document on UK Space covering both Government and private sector activity.

In 2003, he was one of only 15 Conservative MPs who voted against the Iraq War.

He was Chairman of the Conservative Policy Task-force on Science, Technology, Engineering and Mathematics 2005–2009. He chaired the all-Party Parliamentary and Scientific Committee (the oldest all-party committee), which includes the Parliamentary Engineering Group. He was also an officer of several all-party Parliamentary committees, including the Office of Science and Technology, the Information Society Alliance (EURIM), PITCOM (Information Technology Committee) and the Corporate Social Responsibility Group. For his comments on science roles, see https://portlandpress.com/biochemist/article/44/1/2/230733/Government-science-ambitions-require-greater

He was a member of the Commission on National Security 2007–09. He was a Visiting Parliamentary Fellow at St. Antony's College Oxford in the Hilary Term 2007, lecturing on energy security. He chaired the European Movement 2000–05 and the Conservative Europe Group 2007-11 and also in 1985–88. He also chaired the Cuba Initiative 2006–2011.

From 1997 until 2010, he was a non-executive director of or adviser to various companies, according to the Register of Members Interests. In 2008, Taylor gained the (Sir) Arthur C. Clarke Award for Individual Achievement in Promoting Space and Science. He was co-chair of the Parliamentary Space Committee and in 2009 he chaired the European Inter-Parliamentary Space Conference.

He decided not to re-stand as an MP in the run up to the 2010 election.

== After Parliament ==
Taylor has become chairman of tech-related ventures, on the board or advisory board of others. He was a strategic Advisor to the major satellite company Inmarsat 2013-2019. He was on the Government's Science and Technology Facilities Council 2011–2018, on an ESA (European Space Agency) Advisory Board, chaired the National Space Academy steering group until 2018 and was chair and now President of The League of Remembrance. He chaired the UK Innovation & Science Seed Fund UKI2S 2012-2019. He chaired the Space Working Committee of D Group 2019-2024. https://www.dgroup.co.uk/

A podcast interview on his Space roles: https://www.thekarmanline.co.uk/ian-taylor-to-protect-satellites-in-space-find-your-friends-and-stick-with-them/

During the 2019 general election campaign, he declared that he had become an Independent Conservative and explained in an open letter why on balance he supported the Liberal Democrat candidate in Esher and Walton. In 2024 he gave his endorsement to the Lib Dem candidate Monica Harding, and welcomed her general election victory. He has recently supported Prosper UK, an independent group of mainly moderate Conservatives. www.ian-taylor.eu

== Personal life ==
Taylor married Carole Alport in 1974 (daughter of the late Lord Alport), and they have two sons and 5 grandchildren.

Parliament of the United Kingdom
| Preceded by Sir Carol Mather | Member of Parliament for Esher; 1987 – 1997 | Constituency abolished |
| New constituency | Member of Parliament for Esher and Walton; 1997 – 2010 | Succeeded by Dominic Raab |
Political offices
| Preceded by Patrick McLoughlin as Parliamentary Under Secretary of State for Technology | Parliamentary Under Secretary of State for Trade and Technology; 1994 – 1997 | Succeeded by The Lord Sainsbury of Turville |
