= William Robson Brown =

Sir William Robson Brown (1 September 1900 – 25 February 1975) was a British Conservative politician. He was elected in 1950 as the first Member of Parliament for the Surrey constituency of Esher. Robson-Brown served until his retirement in 1970, preceding Carol Mather.

Parliament of the United Kingdom
New constituency	Member of Parliament for Esher; 1950 – 1970	Succeeded by Carol Mather
