= The Paratrooper's Prayer =

Second World War poem popular among airborne troops

La Prière du Para (The Paratrooper's Prayer) is a French poem written by Aspirant (Brevet-Lieutenant) André Zirnheld, upon his death in Libya on July 27, 1942.

The Paratrooper's Prayer has been adopted by all French Metropolitan and Marine Infantry Paratrooper Units and Regiments. The Prayer appears before A. J. Quinnell's novel Man on Fire, the main protagonist of which is an ex-paratrooper in the Legion. This prayer also appears in Lt. Col. Dave Grossman's book, On Combat: The Psychology and Physiology of Deadly Conflict in War and in Peace, Rogue Heroes by Ben Macintyre, and Call Sign Chaos: Learning to Lead by Jim Mattis. The prayer, or some of it, is read in the French film Léon Morin, Priest (1961).

The Prayer of the Paratrooper

(Translation by Robert Petersen)

I'm asking You God, to give me what You have left.
Give me those things which others never ask of You.
I don't ask You for rest, or tranquility.
Not that of the spirit, the body, or the mind.
I don't ask You for wealth, or success, or even health.
All those things are asked of You so much Lord,
that you can't have any left to give.
Give me instead Lord what You have left.
Give me what others don't want.
I want uncertainty and doubt.
I want torment and battle.
And I ask that You give them to me now and forever Lord,
so I can be sure to always have them,
because I won't always have the strength to ask again.
But give me also the courage, the energy,
and the spirit to face them.
I ask You these things Lord,
because I can't ask them of myself(*).

(*) The French text says rather:
For only You can grant
What can come only from myself.

Original French Text
La Prière du Para

Je m'adresse à vous, mon Dieu, car vous donnez
Ce qu'on ne peut obtenir que de soi
Donnez-moi, mon Dieu, ce qui vous reste
Donnez-moi ce qu'on ne vous demande jamais.

Je ne vous demande pas le repos
Ni la tranquillité
Ni celle de l'âme, ni celle du corps.
Je ne vous demande pas la richesse
Ni le succès, ni même la santé.

Tout ça, mon Dieu, on vous le demande tellement
Que vous ne devez plus en avoir.
Donnez-moi, mon Dieu, ce qui vous reste
Donnez-moi ce que l'on vous refuse.

Je veux l'insécurité et l'inquiétude.
Je veux la tourmente et la bagarre
Et que vous me les donniez, mon Dieu, définitivement.
Que je sois sûr de les avoir toujours
Car je n'aurai pas toujours le courage
De vous les demander.

Donnez-moi, mon Dieu, ce qui vous reste.
Donnez-moi ce dont les autres ne veulent pas.
Mais donnez-moi aussi le courage
Et la force et la foi.
Car vous seul donnez, mon Dieu,
Ce que l'on ne peut attendre que de soi.

Literal English Translation

The Prayer of the Paratrooper
I call out to you, my God, because you give
What we cannot get by ourselves
Give me, my God, what remains
Give me what no one ever asks of you.

I do not ask for rest
Nor tranquility
Whether that of the soul or the body.
I ask not for wealth,
Or success, or even health.

All that, my God, you are asked so much for
That you no longer have them.
Give me, my God, what remains
Give me what others refuse.

I want insecurity and worry.
I want turmoil and brawl.
And that you give them to me, my God, forever
So that I am always sure to have them.
For I will not always have the courage to ask.

Give me, my God, what you have.
Give me what others do not want.
But also give me courage
And strength and faith.
Because only you alone can give, my God,
What I cannot expect only from myself.

Portuguese Version

Oraçāo do Paraquedista
Dai-me Senhor, o que Vos resta
Dai-me aquilo que nunca ninguém Vos pede
Eu não Vos peço o repouso
Nem a tranquilidade
Nem a da alma, nem a do corpo
Eu não Vos peço a riqueza,
Nem o êxito,
Nem mesmo a saúde.
Eu quero a incerteza e a inquietude
Eu quero a tormenta e a luta
E concedei-me-las, Senhor, definitivamente.
Que eu tenha a certeza de as ter para sempre
Porque não terei sempre a coragem
De Vos Lhas pedir.
Dai-me Senhor, o que Vos resta.
Dai-me o que os outros não querem.
Mas dai-me também a Coragem
E a Força
E a Fé.

English Translation

Prayer of the Paratrooper
Give me, O Lord, what remains Thine;
What no one ever asks of Thee.
I do not ask Thee for rest
Nor tranquility,
Neither of the soul nor of the body.
I do not ask Thee for riches,
Nor success,
Nor even health.
So many ask you for these, O Lord,
Thou shouldst no longer have anything left to give.
Give me Lord, what remains Thine.
Give me that which all of us refuse.
I want insecurity and restlessness,
I want struggle and trouble.
And grant them to me, My Lord, forever.
Make sure that I will always take them
Because I will not always have the courage
To ask of Thee for them.
Give me, O Lord, what remains Thine,
Give me what others do not want;
But give me also the Courage,
And the Strength,
And the Faith.
Amen.
