= Esher (constituency) =

Parliamentary constituency in the United Kingdom, 1950–1997

Coordinates: 51.35°N 0.37°W

- Former borough constituency for the House of Commons
- County: Surrey

1950–1997
- Seats: One
- Created from: Epsom (parts of); Chertsey (taking Weybridge, Walton, Hersham, East and West Molesey)
- Replaced by: Esher & Walton; Mole Valley (return of four rural wards)
- During its existence contributed to new seat(s) of: Chertsey and Walton (existed 1974–1997)

Esher was a borough constituency represented in the House of Commons of the Parliament of the United Kingdom. It elected one Member of Parliament (MP) by the first past the post system of election. In the general elections during its 47-year lifetime it was won by three Conservatives successively. In area it shrank in 1974, then regrew in 1983 taking in four sparsely inhabited wards which proved to be temporary, as omitted from the successor seat, Esher and Walton.

== Boundaries ==
1950–1974: Urban Districts of Esher, and Walton and Weybridge.

1974–1983: The Urban District of Esher.

Walton, Hersham, Weybridge and Oatlands were transferred to the new Chertsey and Walton seat.

1983–1997:

- The Borough of Guildford wards: Clandon and Horsley, Effingham, Lovelace (included Ockham), and Send (for this period temporarily taken from the Mole Valley seat); and
- Borough of Elmbridge wards: Claygate, Cobham and Downside, Cobham Fairmile, Esher, Hinchley Wood, Long Ditton, Molesey East, Molesey North, Molesey South, Oxshott and Stoke D'Abernon, Thames Ditton, and Weston Green (its whole area except for Walton, Hersham, Weybridge and Oatlands). These 13 wards were equivalent to Esher Urban District.

== Neighbours ==
Neighbours with borders of more than 2 miles (3.2 km) were:

- Dorking
- Guildford
- Chertsey
- Surbiton

or their variations including:

- Chertsey and Walton
- Mole Valley
- Kingston and Surbiton

== Members of Parliament ==
Election	Member	Party	Other terms served as MP
1950	William Robson-Brown	Conservative	None
1970	Carol Mather	Conservative	None
1987	Ian Taylor	Conservative	1997–2010 for Esher and Walton
1997	constituency abolished: see Esher and Walton		

== Elections ==
=== Elections in the 1950s ===
General election 1950: Esher
Party	Candidate	Votes	%
Conservative	William Robson Brown	33,094	60.73
Labour	Ethel Chipchase	15,514	28.56
Liberal	Heather Harvey	5,704	10.50
Majority		17,580	32.37
Turnout		54,312	
Conservative win (new seat)			

General election 1951: Esher
Party	Candidate	Votes	%	±%
Conservative	William Robson Brown	33,755	62.86	
Labour	Percy C McNally	15,334	28.55	
Liberal	Heather Harvey	4,612	8.59	
Majority		18,421	34.31	
Turnout		53,701	83.41	
Conservative hold		Swing		

General election 1955: Esher
Party	Candidate	Votes	%	±%
Conservative	William Robson Brown	33,774	63.66	
Labour	Frederick A Messer	13,132	24.75	
Liberal	Gerald Edward Owen	6,146	11.58	
Majority		20,642	38.91	
Turnout		53,052	79.27	
Conservative hold		Swing		

General election 1959: Esher
Party	Candidate	Votes	%	±%
Conservative	William Robson Brown	37,155	63.17	
Labour	Paul Evelyn Vanson	12,934	21.99	
Liberal	Gerald Edward Owen	8,730	14.84	
Majority		24,221	41.18	
Turnout		58,819	81.49	
Conservative hold		Swing		

=== Elections in the 1960s ===
General election 1964: Esher
Party	Candidate	Votes	%	±%
Conservative	William Robson Brown	33,226	56.19	
Labour	Paul Evelyn Vanson	13,644	23.07	
Liberal	Stephen Robert Cawley	12,259	20.73	
Majority		19,582	33.12	
Turnout		59,129		
Conservative hold		Swing		

General election 1966: Esher
Party	Candidate	Votes	%	±%
Conservative	William Robson Brown	32,649	55.35	
Labour	Cyril Rofe	15,023	25.47	
Liberal	Stephen Robert Cawley	11,310	19.18	
Majority		17,626	29.88	
Turnout		58,982	78.03	
Conservative hold		Swing		

=== Elections in the 1970s ===
General election 1970: Esher
Party	Candidate	Votes	%	±%
Conservative	Carol Mather	37,727	61.83	
Labour	Richard S. Scorer	14,449	23.68	
Liberal	George Kahan	8,845	14.50	
Majority		23,278	38.15	
Turnout		48,021		
Conservative hold		Swing		

General election February 1974: Esher
Party	Candidate	Votes	%	±%
Conservative	Carol Mather	21,775	61.83	
Liberal	C Byers	11,060	28.50	
Labour	GA Barnham	5,970	15.38	
Majority		10,715	27.33	
Turnout		38,805		
Conservative hold		Swing		

General election October 1974: Esher
Party	Candidate	Votes	%	±%
Conservative	Carol Mather	19,741	55.84	
Liberal	Charles Welchman	8,881	25.12	
Labour	A Hudson	6,729	19.03	
Majority		10,860	30.72	
Turnout		35,351	74.31	
Conservative hold		Swing		

General election 1979: Esher
Party	Candidate	Votes	%	±%
Conservative	Carol Mather	24,152	65.10	
Liberal	Charles Welchman	7,311	19.71	
Labour	Richard S. Scorer	5,634	15.19	
Majority		16,841	45.39	
Turnout		37,097	77.51	
Conservative hold		Swing		

=== Elections in the 1980s ===
General election 1983: Esher
Party	Candidate	Votes	%	±%
Conservative	Carol Mather	28,577	63.3	
Liberal	Colin Wheatley	12,665	28.0	
Labour	Daphne Plaskow	3,250	7.2	
Monster Raving Loony	W Wellie	664	1.5	
Majority		15,912	35.3	
Turnout		45,156	73.1	
Conservative hold		Swing		

General election 1987: Esher
Party	Candidate	Votes	%	±%
Conservative	Ian Taylor	31,334	65.5	+2.2
Liberal	Anthony Barnett	12,266	25.7	−2.3
Labour	Norman Lucas	4,197	8.8	+1.6
Majority		19,068	39.8	+4.5
Turnout		47,797	76.9	+3.8
Conservative hold		Swing	+2.3	

=== Elections in the 1990s ===
General election 1992: Esher
Party	Candidate	Votes	%	±%
Conservative	Ian Taylor	31,115	65.4	−0.1
Liberal Democrats	John Richling	10,744	22.6	−3.1
Labour	Julie Reay	5,685	12.0	+3.2
Majority		20,371	42.8	+3.0
Turnout		47,544	80.8	+3.9
Conservative hold		Swing	+1.5	

== See also ==
- List of parliamentary constituencies in Surrey

== Notes and references ==
Notes

== Sources ==
- Election results, 1983 - 1992 (Election Demon,)
- Election results, 1951 - 1992 (Keele University)
