= No. 250 Squadron RAF =

Defunct flying squadron of the Royal Air Force

No. 250 (Sudan) Squadron RAF
- Active: 1 May 1918–15 May 1919; 1 April 1941–2 January 1947
- Country: United Kingdom
- Branch: Royal Air Force
- Type: Flying squadron
- Role: Anti-submarine warfare Air defence
- Nickname(s): Sudan

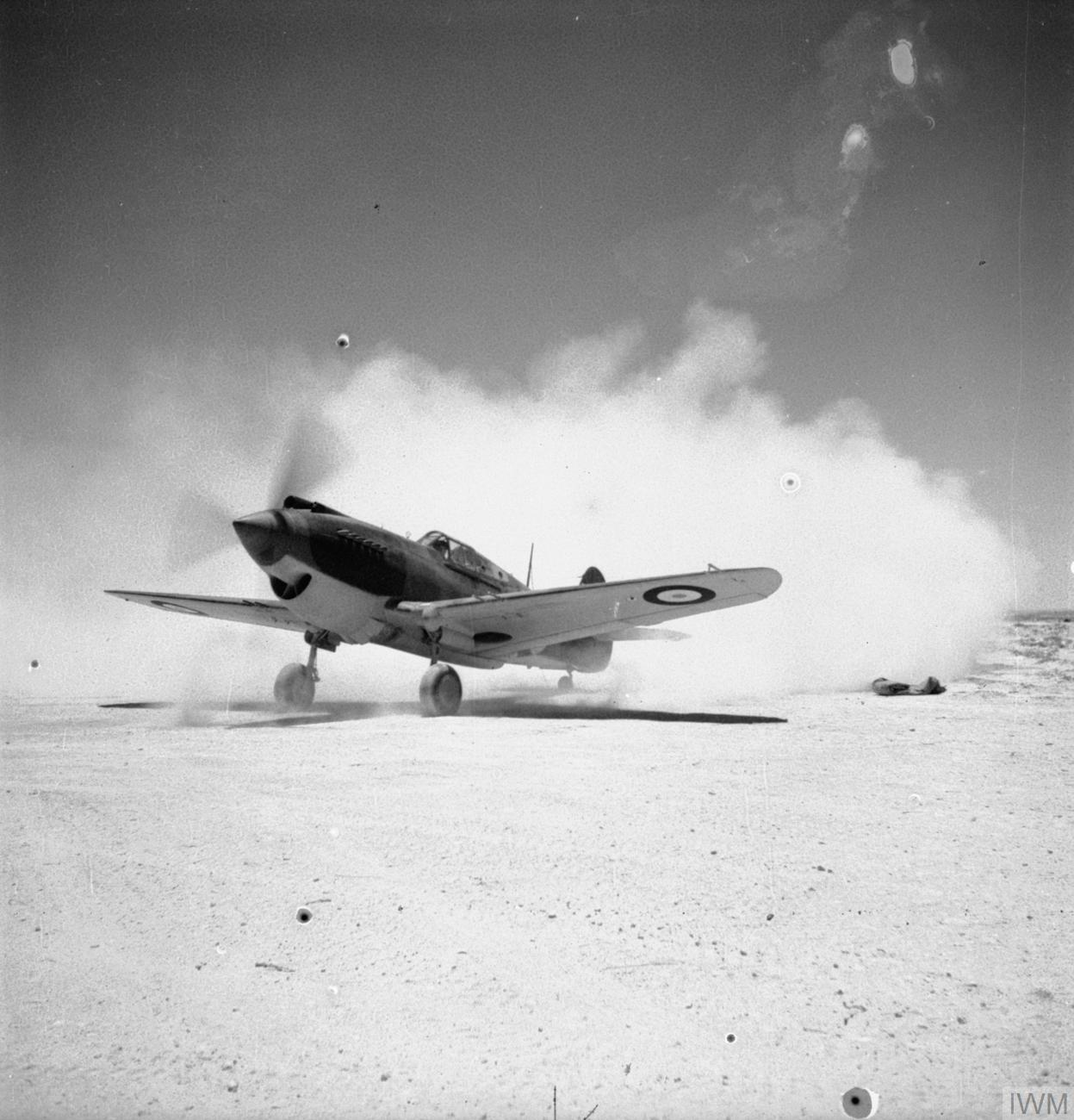
A Curtiss Tomahawk Mark IIB of No. 250 Squadron RAF raises the dust at Sidi Haneish Airfield, before taking off on a patrol.

No. 250 (Sudan) Squadron RAF was a Royal Air Force squadron which operated during the First World War and the Second World War. It was formed during May 1918 as a reconnaissance and anti–submarine unit and was disbanded 12 months later. It reformed as a fighter unit in the Second World War, in April 1941, and was disbanded in January 1947.

== History ==
No. 250 Squadron was formed on 10 May 1918 at Padstow from Nos. 494, 500, 501, 502 and 503 Flights for coastal reconnaissance duties over the Bristol Channel and its approaches. Equipped with a mixture of D.H.6s and D.H.9s, it flew anti-submarine patrols until the Armistice and disbanded on 31 May 1919.

On 1 April 1941, No. 250 Squadron reformed at RAF Aqir from K Flight as No. 250 (Sudan) Squadron and by the end of the month had received enough Tomahawks to become operational on defensive duties in Palestine. In May, a detachment began offensive sweeps over Syria and in June commenced operations in the Western Desert, being withdrawn in February 1942 for defensive operations. After converting to Kittyhawks, it returned to the desert in April as a fighter bomber unit and provided support for the 8th Army, advancing with it through Libya into Tunisia to end the North African campaign. In July 1943, the squadron flew to Malta to support the landings in Sicily moving there a few days afterwards. By mid-September it had occupied airfields in Italy where it spent the rest of the war flying fighter bomber missions. In August 1945, No. 260 Squadron disbanded and transferred its Mustangs to No. 250 Squadron which then flew them until disbanded on 30 December 1946 at Treviso, in Italy.

== Squadron badge ==
The squadron's badge was adorned with a River Eagle, a bird native to Sudan, and the motto Close to the sun. The squadron was donated by the British community in Sudan when it was reformed in 1941.
