= Raid on Sidi Haneish Airfield =

Military operation during World War II

- Part of the Western Desert Campaign of the Second World War
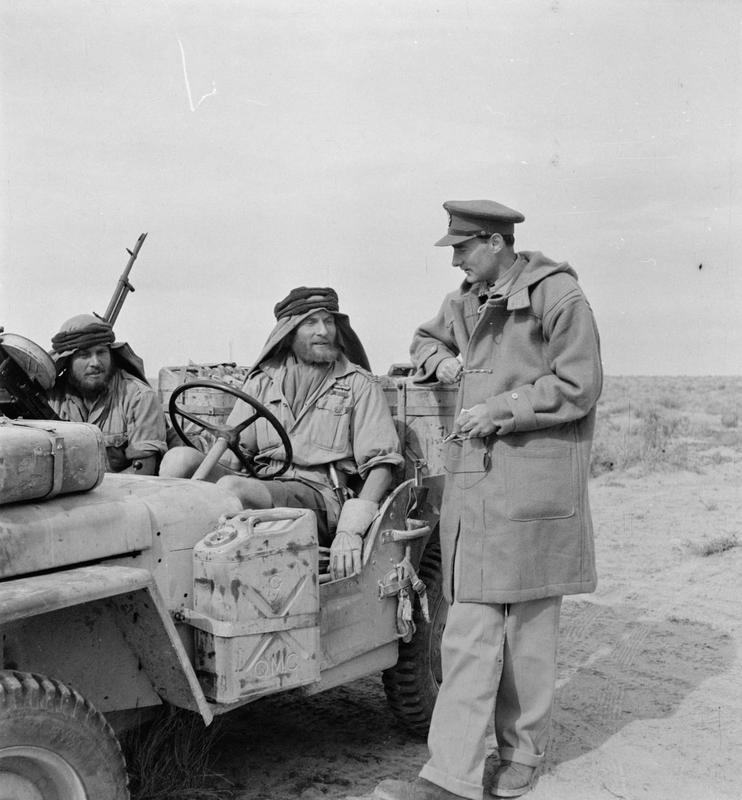
- Colonel David Stirling with Lt Edward McDonald and other SAS soldiers in North Africa, January 1943.
Date	26–27 July 1942
Location	Sidi Haneish Airfield, north-western Egypt 31°09′45″N 27°37′38″E
Result	Allied victory

Belligerents
United Kingdom; Free France	Germany

Commanders and leaders
(United Kingdom) David Stirling (United Kingdom) Carol Mather (United Kingdom) Paddy Mayne (United Kingdom) George Jellicoe	Unknown

Strength
18 armed jeeps Special Air Service	Unknown

Casualties and losses
2 killed in action Lance Bombardier John Robson (British) & Aspirant André Zirnheld (France); 3 jeeps lost	37 aircraft destroyed: Numerous casualties

The Raid on Sidi Haneish Airfield was a military operation carried out the night of 26 July 1942. A British Special Air Service unit commanded by Major David Stirling attacked a German-held airfield in Egypt during the Western Desert Campaign of Second World War. Several Luftwaffe aircraft used to ferry supplies to the Axis forces were destroyed or damaged with machine-gun fire and explosives. Axis front line units were diverted to reinforce the garrisons in the rear vulnerable to attack.

== Background ==
=== Axis supply ===
In November 1941, 70% of supplies being sent to Axis forces in North Africa were lost to Allied air and naval attacks. By 1942, German and Italian forces in North Africa faced a serious supply shortage with Allied forces sinking merchant ships in the Mediterranean Sea. Axis supplies were being transported down the Italian Peninsula, mainly by rail, to southern ports for shipment to North Africa. The Royal Navy was deploying growing numbers of ships and submarines to the area to intercept Axis supply convoys forcing the Luftwaffe to carry some of the burden of supplying the Afrika Korps and Italian troops by air. The terrain in North Africa often made land transport impractical, forcing aircraft to fly between remote desert airstrips to deliver supplies, parts, troops and food.

=== Special Air Service ===
In July 1941, Major David Stirling formed the Special Air Service for bold operations behind Axis lines. Initially dubbed 'L' Detachment, Special Air Service Brigade, the unit consisted of men drawn from conventional British units and given ad hoc parachute training. The unit was based in Jalo Oasis and gained a reputation for daring raids on German bases, infiltrating them and destroying parked aircraft with explosives. Stirling became known among the Germans as the "Phantom Major".

== Prelude ==
Stirling had for some time been developing a plan to attack the Sidi Haneish Airfield, a complex located 235 mi (378 km) west of Cairo, which the Germans called Haggag el Qasaba. The raid was to involve a tactic unfamiliar to the SAS; storming the base in vehicles, rather than discreetly penetrating it. The SAS was no longer dependent on the Long Range Desert Group for transport, judging the firepower and speed of the jeeps to be sufficient to overcome the German defences. The raiders were to drive 50 mi (80 km) through the desert from a hideout in Bir el Quseir and then overrun the airfield in 18 jeeps in two columns, with Stirling at the lead. Each jeep carried four Vickers K machine guns, a rapid-firing weapon, originally designed for aircraft use. On the night of 25/26 July, the men held a dress rehearsal.

== Raid ==
The raid commenced on the night of 26/27 July, with the 18 jeeps, each carrying three or four British or French commandos, navigating the desert in formation without headlights. The weather was ideal with a full moon and no clouds. As the raiders approached the airfield, the lights lining the runway switched on, causing concern among the commandos who feared they had been detected but the lights had been turned on for a Luftwaffe bomber to land. Stirling fired a green flare and ordered the jeeps forward onto the airfield in 'V' formation. The SAS stormed the airfield, using their K guns, loaded with tracer ammunition, to fire on the parked German aircraft which included Junkers Ju 87 Stuka dive bombers, Junkers Ju 52 cargo aircraft and Messerschmitt Bf 109 fighters. Two columns of jeeps flanked Stirling's jeep, on his left, one column led by Paddy Mayne, on his right, another led by his 2iC, George Jellicoe. German troops retaliated with machine-guns and anti-aircraft weapons, disabling one jeep. Lance Bombardier John Robson, a 21-year-old SAS soldier manning a machine gun, was shot and killed, the only Allied casualty of the raid itself. The raiders used most of their ammunition and manoeuvred to escape after a last sweep for undamaged aircraft. Paddy Mayne placed a bomb in the engine of a parked bomber before withdrawing. In about 15 minutes, the raiders destroyed or damaged 37 Luftwaffe aircraft.

=== Escape ===
The raiders escaped into the desert, less one jeep and one man killed and split into groups of three to five jeeps, seeking to evade detection by German aircraft since only two and a half hours of darkness remained; in daylight, they would become vulnerable to air attack. The SAS hid during the day, camouflaging their vehicles and all but one group reached Bir el Quseir. A group of jeeps operated by French troops were slowed by punctures and breakdowns, exposing them in the desert. They were spotted by four Stuka dive-bombers which made nine attacks, fatally wounding paratrooper André Zirnheld. After the Stukas ran out of ammunition, the commandos boarded the last operational jeep and reached safety.

== Aftermath ==
The raid was a great success, several of the destroyed German aircraft being Junkers 52 transport aircraft, the loss of which exacerbated Axis supply difficulties.

Stirling was captured by the Germans in January 1943 and spent the rest of the war in and out of Axis prisoner of war camps. He was replaced by Mayne as commander of the SAS.

== See also ==
- Raid on Bardia
- Operation Caravan
- Operation Spiderweb
- Desert warfare
- List of North African airfields during World War II
