= Richard S. Scorer =

British meteorologist

- Born: 30 August 1919; Lincoln, England
- Died: 21 May 2011 (aged 91); London
- Citizenship: British
- Education: PhD
- Alma mater: Cambridge University
- Known for: Mountain waves theory, cumulus formation
- Scientific career
- Fields: Meteorology
- Institutions: Met Office, Imperial College London
- Academic advisors: Sir Geoffrey Taylor and George Batchelor

Richard Segar Scorer (30 August 1919 – 21 May 2011) was a British meteorologist. He was a contributor to the theory on mountain waves. Scorer also worked on the cloud physics and his exchanges with the American meteorologist Joanne Simpson helped to better understand the formation of cumulus clouds.

== Early life ==
Richard Scorer was born in Lincoln, England, in 1919, at 11 Lindum Terrace. He was the second son, after Philip.

His father was a senior partner in a firm of solicitors, and later clerk to Lindsey County Council. His mother was a lecturer at Bishop Grosseteste College, a teacher training college. His younger brother was architect Sam Scorer, and like him went to Repton School. From his youth, he showed great aptitude for mathematics and won a scholarship to the University of Cambridge where he did his undergraduate studies.

== Career ==
In 1941, during World War II, he joined the UK Met Office as a junior forecaster, first for RAF Bomber Command and the Supply Command then he was transferred to Gibraltar to do weather forecasting for North Africa. He was commissioned as a flying officer in January 1943.

=== Research ===
Scorer returned to Cambridge after the war to complete his Master and Doctoral studies with G. I. Taylor and George Batchelor. He then joined the meteorology department at Imperial College London where he worked with his friend and colleague Frank Ludlam.

In 1949, he published an article titled "Theory of Waves in the Lee of Mountains" where he developed the mathematics of this air flow, in particular trapped waves that produce stable oscillations. From this paper was extracted the 'Scorer parameter' for the atmospheric gravity waves over a mountain barrier:

$l^2 (z) = N^2/U^2 - (\partial ^2 U / \partial z^2 )/U$

where N = N(z) is the Brunt–Väisälä frequency and U = U(z) is the vertical profile of the horizontal wind, both quantities are determined from an atmospheric sounding upstream of the barrier. When l^{2}(z) is nearly constant with height, conditions are favourable for vertically propagating mountain waves. When l^{2}(z) decreases strongly with height, the waves are trapped in the layer around the mountain top and below.

Scorer also wrote articles with Frank Ludlam on the cumulus lifecycle. Their views were in conflict with those of the American Joanne Simpson which led to an exchange of letters and a meeting in 1954 for a significant advancement of knowledge in this field.

Scorer went afterward to the Department of Mathematics where he became professor of theoretical mechanics in 1962, and played an important role in the growth of the group on applied mathematics.

Richard Scorer established the Research Group on air pollution at Imperial College, the first in the UK to be devoted exclusively to this field of study. He was chosen on the National Council for the quality of the air and played an important role in the drafting of the British Clean Air Act. He was also an adviser to the environmental impact survey of Concorde.

=== Politics ===
Scorer carried out a US tour sponsored by the chemical industry in which he spoke against ongoing research into human effects on the ozone layer.

In the general elections of 1970 and 1979, Scorer was the Labour Party candidate for the constituency of Esher but was defeated each time. He was an alderman of the London Borough of Merton from 1970 to 1977 and was elected a trustee of Wimbledon Common for four years. In addition to being the author of 16 books, he was a photographer, a cyclist, a marathon runner, a mountaineer, a bird watcher, a carpenter and talented luthier.

=== Personal life ===
Richard Scorer married Joan, whom he had met in Cambridge, on 20 December 1944 at St. Ann's Church, Manchester. His wife, Dorothy Joan Toft, was from Salford. In the 1940s they lived at 5 Richmond Terrace, Cambridge. They had three daughters: Beatrice Jean born 24 October 1947, Margaret and Valerie.

Joan died of cancer in 1964 and he remarried later with Margaret, with whom he had two sons, Jason and Richard Xenophon on 21 July 1967, and a daughter, Josephine. Scorer and his wife were also foster parents for two children during the 1970s.

There is a wooden memorial bench dedicated to Richard Segar Scorer on the New Precipice Walk above Penmaenpool in North Wales. It provides a spectacular view across the Mawddach Estuary to the mountain Cadair Idris. The inscription describes his love of watching the clouds form over the mountain and also carries a quotation from 'The Cloud' by Shelley.

== Notoriety ==
Richard Scorer was elected to the Royal Meteorological Society in December 1949 and was president from 1986 to 1988. He became Honorary Fellow of the Society in 1992, the highest form of recognition for an outstanding contribution to the Society and meteorology.

Professional and academic associations
Preceded by Andrew Gilchrist	President of the Royal Meteorological Society; 1986–88	Succeeded by Keith Browning
