= Carol Mather =

British Army officer and politician (1919–2006)

Sir Carol Mather MC

Comptroller of the Household
- In office 17 February 1983 – 16 October 1986
- Prime Minister: Margaret Thatcher
- Preceded by: Anthony Berry
- Succeeded by: Robert Boscawen

Vice-Chamberlain of the Household
- In office 30 September 1981 – 17 February 1983
- Prime Minister: Margaret Thatcher
- Preceded by: Anthony Berry
- Succeeded by: Robert Boscawen

Member of Parliament for Esher
- In office 18 June 1970 – 18 May 1987
- Preceded by: William Robson Brown
- Succeeded by: Ian Taylor

Personal details
- Born: David Carol MacDonnell Mather; 3 January 1919 Adlington, England
- Died: 3 July 2006 (aged 87) Lower Oddington, England
- Party: Conservative
- Spouse: Philippa Bewicke-Copley
- Children: 4
- Education: Trinity College, Cambridge

Military service
- Allegiance: United Kingdom
- Branch/service: British Army
- Years of service: 1939–1962
- Rank: Lieutenant colonel
- Unit: Welsh Guards; No.8 Commando; Special Air Service
- Battles/wars: World War II

Sir David Carol MacDonnell Mather MC (3 January 1919 – 3 July 2006) was a British soldier and Conservative politician.

After serving 22 years in the British Army, he was the Member of Parliament for Esher from 1970 until 1987. During his political career he held the offices of Lord Commissioner of the Treasury, as Vice-Chamberlain of the Household, and Comptroller of the Household.

== Early life ==
Mather was born in Adlington, Cheshire, the younger son of Loris Emerson Mather and Gwendoline Leila Morley. His family owned Mather and Platt, an engineering company in Manchester, which was chaired by his father and later managed by his elder brother, William. His grandfather was Sir William Mather, who sat as Liberal MP for successively Salford South, Gorton and Rossendale from 1885 to 1904.

Mather was educated at Amesbury, Harrow and Trinity College, Cambridge, and then joined his elder brother at the family company as an apprentice for a short period.

== Second World War ==
He joined the Welsh Guards at the outbreak of the Second World War in 1939, and was trained at Sandhurst. In February 1940, before his officer training was complete, Mather volunteered to join the 5th Special Reserve Battalion, Scots Guards.

The battalion was formed in anticipation of supporting Finland in the Winter War in 1939–1940, but the conflict ended before it left the UK. Mather returned to training with the Welsh Guards and was commissioned in March 1940. He volunteered for training at the Irregular Warfare Training Centre in Lochailort in October 1940, joined No. 8 Commando, and headed with the unit to North Africa in January 1941 as part of Layforce.

After 8 Commando was disbanded on 1 August 1941, Mather joined "L Detachment", the nucleus of the future SAS headed by David Stirling, where he joined raids on Axis airfields, notably the raid on Sidi Haneish airfield in June 1942.

In October 1942, he was offered the opportunity to join his elder brother on the staff of General Montgomery. Montgomery was a family friend, through his wife, Betty. Rejoining Stirling's force for a last operation deep behind enemy lines, he was captured by the Italians in Tripolitania on 20 December 1942.

He was transferred to Italy by submarine, and spent 9 months as a prisoner of war in Fontanellato in Northern Italy. He escaped in September 1943, shortly after the Italians agreed an armistice with the Allies, and walked 600 miles down the Apennines to the Allied lines near Campobasso, north-east of Naples.

He returned to England in November 1943, and rejoined Montgomery as a liaison officer in early 1944 to assist with preparations for D-Day. He landed on D+1, and remained with Montgomery through the operations in Northern France and Belgium, acting as Montgomery's eyes and ears on the front line.

He was awarded the MC for a successful reconnaissance mission in Nijmegen on 18 September 1944, on the second day of Operation Market Garden, while it was still occupied by the German Army. On 9 January 1945, he survived being on an Auster that was shot down near Grave in the Netherlands: the pilot was killed, and another passenger, Major Richard Harden, took the controls and crash-landed while Mather deployed the flaps. Mather was hit by four bullets and badly injured, suffering 13 separate wounds and losing a kidney. He spent several months in hospital before rejoining Montgomery in July 1945 near Osnabrück.

=== Post-war military career ===
Mather joined the regular army in 1946, returning to his regiment the Welsh Guards in Palestine during the Jewish insurgency in Mandatory Palestine, where he remained until the independence of Israel in 1948. He was Assistant Military Attaché in Athens from 1953 to 1956, served in military intelligence in the War Office from 1956 to 1961 and in the Far East from 1961 to 1962, when he retired with the rank of lieutenant-colonel.

== Political career ==
He resigned his commission in 1962 to join the research department of the Conservative Party, working alongside Christopher Chataway and Anthony Meyer. His grandfather had been a Liberal MP. He became a councillor on Eton Rural District Council in 1965.

He stood for Parliament in Leicester North West at the 1966 general election; the Labour safe seat was held by the incumbent Barnett Janner by a wide margin. He then joined 250 other aspiring MPs (including colleagues from the research department) in competing to be selected as prospective Parliamentary candidate for Esher, a safe Conservative seat, in 1969. Elected at the 1970 general election, he disagreed almost immediately with Prime Minister Edward Heath's course of joining the European Economic Community. He remained a Eurosceptic throughout his political career. He also campaigned vigorously for the return of capital punishment; supported the suggestion in 1974 for the creation of a 10,000-strong "Citizen Volunteer Force" to support the police; supported the role of the Army in Northern Ireland, and Royal Ulster Constabulary; and campaigned against the M25 being driven through his constituency. His strong views gained him appointments on various backbench committees, but did not endear him to the party leadership.

He became less vocal in sharing his views when Margaret Thatcher appointed him as an opposition whip in 1975, soon after she became leader of the Conservatives. After James Callaghan's Labour government lost a motion of no confidence by one vote in 1979, orchestrated in part by Mather, he became a government whip after the Conservatives won the 1979 general election. He served as a Lord Commissioner of the Treasury from 1979 to 1981, as Vice-Chamberlain of the Household from 1981 to 1983, and finally as Comptroller of the Household from 1981 until 1987. He received a knighthood in the 1987 New Year Honours, and retired at the 1987 general election.

== Later years ==
In retirement, he wrote Aftermath of War: Everyone Must Go Home, published in 1992. A memoir of his duties in Germany in 1945, visiting camps holding Axis prisoners, including Cossacks and Yugoslavs who fought for the Germans and who were returned to face an uncertain future under Stalin and Tito, the book was also a defence of Harold Macmillan against allegations of treachery made by Nikolai Tolstoy. He published a war memoir in 1997 entitled: When the Grass Stops Growing.

== Death ==
Mather died on 3 July 2006 at the age of 87 in the Gloucestershire village of Lower Oddington. After a funeral service at St. Nicholas' Church in Lower Oddington, his body was buried in its graveyard.

== Personal life ==
On 13 January 1951 Mather married the Honourable Philippa Selina Bewicke-Copley (born 5 December 1925), daughter of the 5th Baron Cromwell, who survived him after 55 years of marriage and died on 30 August 2021, aged 95. Together, they had one son and three daughters.

He enjoyed sketching in pen and ink, and painting in watercolours. He also took part in and outdoor pursuits, including skiing and fishing. He played polo and enjoyed fox hunting. He also rode, and won, point-to-point races.

Mather's private papers from World War 2 are held at the Imperial War Museum, London.

== Publications ==
- Aftermath of War: Everyone Must Go Home (1992).
- When the Grass Stops Growing (1997).

Political offices
Preceded by Anthony Berry	Vice-Chamberlain of the Household; 1981–1983	Succeeded by Robert Boscawen
Preceded by Anthony Berry	Comptroller of the Household; 1983–1986	Succeeded by Robert Boscawen
Parliament of the United Kingdom
Preceded by William Robson Brown	Member for Esher; 1970 – 1987	Succeeded by Ian Taylor
