= Robert Boscawen =

British politician

The Right Honourable Robert Boscawen MC

Vice-Chamberlain of the Household
- In office 17 February 1983 – 16 October 1986
- Prime Minister: Margaret Thatcher
- Preceded by: Carol Mather
- Succeeded by: Tristan Garel-Jones

Comptroller of the Household
- In office 16 October 1986 – 26 July 1988
- Prime Minister: Margaret Thatcher
- Preceded by: Carol Mather
- Succeeded by: Tristan Garel-Jones

Member of Parliament for Wells
- In office 18 June 1970 – 13 May 1983
- Preceded by: Lynch Maydon
- Succeeded by: David Heathcoat-Amory

Member of Parliament for Somerton and Frome
- In office 9 June 1983 – 16 March 1992
- Succeeded by: Mark Robinson

Personal details
- Born: 17 March 1923 Cornwall, England
- Died: 28 December 2013 (aged 90) Isle of Wight, England
- Party: Conservative
- Spouse: Mary Codrington (m. 1949; died 2013)
- Children: 3
- Education: Eton College
- Alma mater: Trinity College, Cambridge
- Occupation: Politician

Robert Thomas Boscawen MC PC (17 March 1923 – 28 December 2013) was a British Conservative politician. He was the last member of the House of Commons to hold a Military Cross for action during the Second World War.

== Background and education ==
Robert Boscawen was the fourth son of Evelyn Hugh John Boscawen, eighth Viscount Falmouth, of Tregothnan, by his wife Mary (née Meynell, descended from the Earls of Halifax) A member of a very old Cornish family, his ancestors included Prime Minister Charles Grey, 2nd Earl Grey, and Admiral Edward Boscawen, victor over the French at the Battle of Lagos. Boscawen was educated at West Downs School and Eton College.

== Military career ==
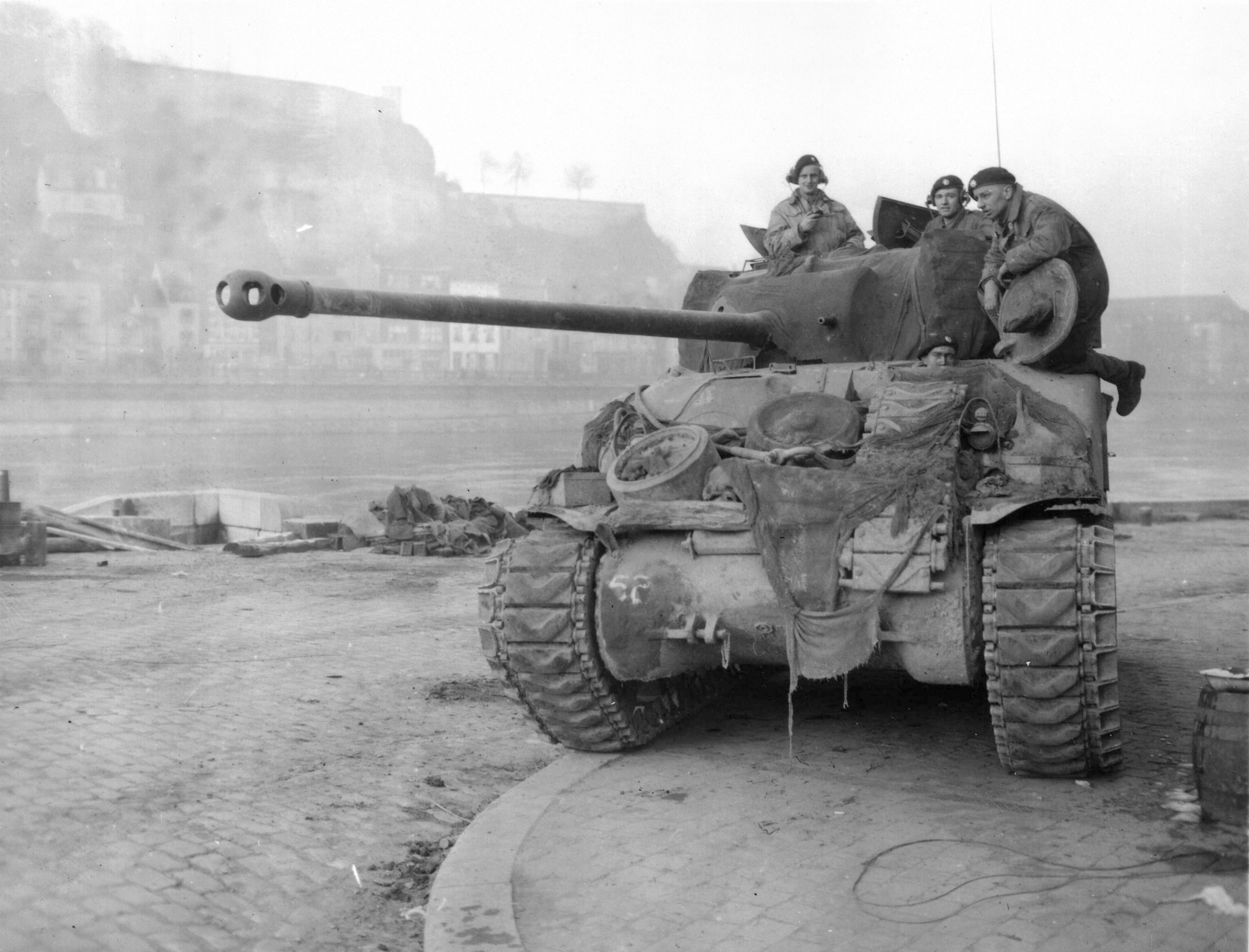
Robert Boscawn on the left in his Sherman Firefly at Namur during the Battle of the Bulge

Too young for military service at the outbreak of the Second World War, Boscawen went to Trinity College, Cambridge, where he read mechanical science and took the special army engineering course. In 1941, he joined the Royal Engineers. However, on 4 September 1942, he was commissioned as a second lieutenant into the 1st Battalion of the Coldstream Guards (with which members of his family had served since 1769, including his brothers George and Evelyn, who had been killed during the evacuation from Dunkirk), and his service number was 243507. The battalion formed part of the 5th Guards Armoured Brigade, part of Major General Allan Adair's Guards Armoured Division, and Boscawen was sent to the cavalry wing of Sandhurst to train as a tank commander. In September 1944, after having fought in the Battle of Normandy, his battalion were among the first tanks to enter Brussels. A week after Operation Market Garden had finished, he was awarded the Military Cross (MC) during the German counter offensive against the Nijmegen bridgehead.

In April 1945, during the last month of the war, he was very seriously wounded and sustained disfiguring burns when a shell pierced his tank. He was evacuated to Archibald McIndoe's pioneering "Guinea Pig Club" plastic surgery unit at Queen Victoria Hospital in East Grinstead, Sussex, spending much of the next three years in hospital.

He is the author of Armoured Guardsmen, a book which follows the Coldstreamers through France, Belgium and Holland, in 1944/45.

== Political career ==
Boscawen served during 1947 and 1948 in Hamburg, West Germany, with the British Red Cross civilian relief teams organised by his mother, Lady Falmouth, a vice-chairman of the Conservative Party. From 1948, he spent two years with Shell Petroleum as a management trainee before joining the family-owned Cornish china clay business, Goonveen, at Rostowrack. He became a Lloyd's underwriter in 1952. Boscawen's party political career began in 1948 when he joined the Young Conservatives.

Boscawen contested Falmouth and Camborne in elections in both 1964 and 1966, achieving a swing to the Conservatives but not enough to win, and was subsequently deselected because of his support for the right-wing Monday Club: local party activists thought his membership of the club would harm his ability to appeal to a traditionally radical-leaning seat. For thirteen years, from 1970 until 1983, he was the member for Wells and then, as the result of boundary changes, his constituency became Somerton and Frome, which he held for a further nine years, from 1983 to 1992.

In Parliament, Boscawen was noted for his right-wing views. He supported the restoration of capital punishment and drastic cuts in the welfare state and student grants and opposed abortion. He also became a leading supporter of Ian Smith after Rhodesia's Unilateral Declaration of Independence. He voted against the imposition of sanctions in defiance of the Party Whip. He was also initially opposed to Britain's entry into the European Common Market but later tentatively supported it, warning opponents against using war memories to make decisions affecting future generations.

Boscawen was interested in the National Health Service and sat on its London Executive Council from 1954 to 1965. Also, he was on the backbenchers' Health Services Committee and vice-chairman from 1974 to 1979.

He was scathing about attempts to raise MPs' pay in 1976 at a time of financial hardship for many, saying it "brought ignominy" on the whole House.

Boscawen served as an assistant whip from 1979, as a Lord Commissioner of the Treasury from 1981, and then Vice Chamberlain of Her Majesty's Household 1983–86 and finally Comptroller of the Royal Household until 1988. He became a member of the Privy Council in 1992, in the same year that he retired from the House of Commons.

== Personal life ==
Boscawen married Mary Codrington in 1949 and they had two daughters, Dozmary and Karenza, and one son, Hugh, who followed him into the Coldstream Guards. They lived at Ivythorm Manor in Street, Somerset. His wife predeceased him by seven months, dying in May 2013.

Boscawen was a rower and yachtsman. He stroked the Trinity boat and rowed in the university trial eights. He was a member of the Royal Yacht Squadron and regularly sailed in international races, including the Fastnet.

Boscawen died on the Isle of Wight on 28 December 2013 at age 90.

== Bibliography ==
- Boscawen, Robert. Armoured Guardsmen: A War Diary, June 1944 – April 1945. Barnsley, England: Pen & Sword, 2001.
- Times Guide to the House of Commons 1987

Political offices
Preceded by Carol Mather	Vice-Chamberlain of the Household; 1983–1986	Succeeded by Tristan Garel-Jones
Preceded by Carol Mather	Comptroller of the Household; 1986–1988	Succeeded by Tristan Garel-Jones
Parliament of the United Kingdom
Preceded by Lynch Maydon	Member of Parliament for Wells; 1970–1983	Succeeded by David Heathcoat-Amory
New constituency	Member of Parliament for Somerton and Frome; 1983–1992	Succeeded by Mark Robinson
