= Sidi Haneish Airfield =

World War II era airfield complex in Egypt

Sidi Haneish Airfield
- Haggag el Qasaba Flugplatz
- Sidi Haneish in Egypt

Site information
- Type: Military airfield complex
- Operator: Luftwaffe; Royal Air Force; United States Army Air Forces

Location
- Shown within Egypt Sidi Haneish (Mediterranean)
- Coordinates: 31°08′30″N 027°31′15″E (East Airfield); 31°08′30″N 027°31′10″E (West Airfield)

Site history
- Built: 1941
- In use: 1941–42
- Battles/wars: Western Desert Campaign

Sidi Haneish Airfield is an abandoned World War II military airfield complex in Egypt, in the western desert, about 376 km (235 miles) west-northwest of Cairo.

The airfield, known as Haggag el Qasaba by the German Luftwaffe, was the location of one of the most daring raids during World War II by the British Special Air Service (SAS). On the night of 26 July 1942, SAS Detachment "L", also known as "Stirling's Raiders", attacked the airfield, then under Luftwaffe control. Driving a convoy of eighteen jeeps, each carrying 3 or 4 British or French commandos, the raiders destroyed or damaged around forty Luftwaffe aircraft. The attack damaged the Luftwaffe's capability during the German invasion of Egypt and also, by the destruction of many transport aircraft, severely diminished its ability to re-supply German land forces in the field.

The airfield was later used by the United States Army Air Forces Ninth Air Force during the Eastern Desert Campaign by the British Eighth Army, which the 57th Fighter Group, flew Curtiss P-40 Warhawks from 8–12 November 1942.

It was apparently abandoned after the western desert campaign moved into Libya and eventually was taken over by the desert. Aerial photos show some evidence of where it existed.

== British airfields ==
The LG-12 (Landing Ground) North site is given as – 31°09′0″N 027°32′0″E Units:

- No. 33 Squadron RAF
- No. 213 (Ceylon) Squadron RAF
- No. 229 Squadron RAF
- No. 238 Squadron RAF
- No. 250 Squadron RAF
- No. 450 Squadron RAAF

The LG-13 South is given as – 31°07′5″N 027°31′0″E Units:

- No. 73 Squadron RAF
- No. 80 Squadron RAF
- No. 92 (East India) Squadron RAF
- No. 145 Squadron RAF
- No. 238 Squadron RAF
- No. 250 (Sudan) Squadron RAF
- No. 274 Squadron RAF
- No. 335 (Greek) Squadron RAF
- No. 601 (County of London) Squadron AAF

The LG-101 is given as – 31°06′0″N 027°31′0″E Units:

- No. 33 Squadron RAF
- No. 74 Squadron RAF
- No. 203 Squadron RAF
- No. 213 (Ceylon) Squadron RAF
- No. 238 Squadron RAF
- No. 250 (Sudan) Squadron RAF
- No. 260 Squadron RAF
- No. 450 Squadron RAAF

The LG-102 is given as – 31°06′0″N 027°33′5″E Units:

- No. 6 Squadron RAF
- No. 30 Squadron RAF
- No. 80 Squadron RAF
- No. 112 Squadron RAF
- No. 229 Squadron RAF
- No. 250 (Sudan) Squadron RAF
- No. 450 Squadron RAAF

== See also ==
- List of North African airfields during World War II
- Second Battle of El Alamein
