= 1981 United Kingdom budget =

- Presented: 10 March 1981
- Country: United Kingdom
- Parliament: 48th
- Party: Conservative Party
- Chancellor: Geoffrey Howe

The 1981 United Kingdom budget was delivered by Geoffrey Howe, the then Chancellor of the Exchequer, to the House of Commons on 10 March 1981. It was Geoffrey Howe's third budget and the second of the first Thatcher ministry. The budget represented a strongly monetarist response to the stagflation and high government borrowing which the UK was suffering at the time. The budget speech lasted for 91 minutes.

== Background ==
The budget was given during a time of significant economic malaise in the United Kingdom, with unemployment having increased by almost one million in the prior 12 months and inflation running at around 15%.

== Measures ==
The budget increased net taxes by £4 billion (in 1981 prices).

A new 20% tax on North Sea oil was introduced.

A one-off windfall tax on certain bank deposits was introduced, in the form of a 2.5% levy on deposits of banking businesses, charged by reference to non-interest bearing sterling deposits in excess of £10 million averaged over the final three months of 1980. The tax was estimated to raise £400 million in total revenues (in 1981 prices).

There was no increase in income tax personal allowances or tax rate thresholds, resulting in a significant real-terms income tax rise as inflation was around 15% per year at the time.

The 25p rate of tax introduced by Labour in 1978 was abolished.

Duties were raised significantly, with duty on petrol increased by 20p per gallon, duty on a packet of 20 cigarettes increased by 13p, duty on beer increased by 4p, duty on spirits increased by 60p, and duty on wine increased by 12p.

== Reception ==
The budget was controversial. Leader of the Opposition Michael Foot said of it: "This is a budget to produce over three million unemployed".

At the end of March, a group of 364 economists sent a statement to Margaret Thatcher, Geoffrey Howe and the media at large which was strongly critical of the budget and expressed the view that there was "no basis in economic theory or supporting evidence" for its measures, and that it threatened the UK's "social and political stability". This statement is often inaccurately described as a "letter to The Times" when in fact no letter was sent or indeed published.

One week after the budget was delivered, the Conservative member Christopher Brocklebank-Fowler crossed the floor of the House to join the SDP during a debate on the budget resolutions.

== See also ==
- Gang of 25
