= School of Airborne Troops (France) =

Military school in Pau, France

- École des troupes aéroportées (ETAP)
- Part of French Army
- Pau, France

Site information
- Type: Barracks
- Owner: Ministry of Defense
- Controlled by: France
- Condition: Occupied by Ministry of Defense

Site history
- Built: 1964

The École des troupes aéroportées (ETAP), or School of Airborne Troops, is a military school dedicated to training the military paratroopers of the French army. It was established in 1964 and is located in the town of Pau, in the department of Pyrénées-Atlantiques, France.

It is a training unit of the French Army, under the French Army Training Command (COFAT). The only parachute regiment that is not trained here is the 2nd Foreign Parachute Regiment, which trains at Camp Raffalli in the Promo Parachutiste.

== History ==
The ETAP has its origins at the end of the Second World War with the establishment of the Airborne Troops Training Center (CETAP) on 16 April 1946. On 1 June 1947, the CETAP became the ETAP. As of 7 October 2014, 899 American soldiers have graduated the ETAP.

== Mission ==
The ETAP is responsible for training paratroopers, officer and enlisted. It is also responsible for international cooperation and promotion of paratroop culture. It also serves as a center for the development of paratroop doctrine and training.

== Composition ==
The ETAP is divided into three components: a command center, a training centre, and a support center.

== Training courses ==
- Training for certification as military Parachuting (2 weeks)
- Officer and NCO training (7 days to 4 weeks)
- Training for paratrooper monitors, free drop monitors, and pilotes parachutes biplaces (8 weeks)
- Training for Chuteurs Opérationnels (12 weeks)
- Training for air-delivery
- Training in drop techniques
- Military training to other countries within the framework of cooperation

== Units which train at ETAP ==
- 8th Marine Infantry Parachute Regiment: 8e Régiment Parachutiste d'Infanterie de Marine (8e RPIMa)
