= Geoffrey Pattie =

British politician (1936–2024)

The Right Honourable Sir Geoffrey Pattie

Minister of State, Industry and Information Technology
- In office September 1983 – 13 July 1987
- Prime Minister: Margaret Thatcher
- Preceded by: Kenneth Baker
- Succeeded by: none, office abolished

Parliamentary Undersecretary of State for Defence Procurement
- In office 29 May 1981 – 13 September 1983
- Prime Minister: Margaret Thatcher
- Preceded by: Viscount Trenchard
- Succeeded by: Hon. Adam Butler

Parliamentary Undersecretary of State for the Air Force
- In office 6 May 1979 – 29 May 1981
- Prime Minister: Margaret Thatcher
- Preceded by: A J Wellbeloved
- Succeeded by: none, office abolished

Member of Parliament for Chertsey and Walton
- In office 28 February 1974 – 8 April 1997
- Preceded by: Constituency established
- Succeeded by: Constituency abolished

Personal details
- Born: 17 January 1936 Stockton-on-Tees, County Durham, England
- Died: 8 October 2024 (aged 88) Duncton, West Sussex, England
- Party: Conservative
- Education: St Catharine's College, Cambridge
- Known for: Soldier, businessman and politician

Sir Geoffrey Edwin Pattie (17 January 1936 – 8 October 2024) was a British Conservative politician and Member of Parliament.

Pattie was also chairman of the controversial company SCL Group, the parent company of Cambridge Analytica, which offered "psychological warfare" services aimed at influencing elections.

== Early life, education and military service ==
Pattie was born in Stockton-on-Tees, County Durham on 17 January 1936. He was educated at Durham School, and St Catharine's College, Cambridge where he obtained an MA Honours Degree in Law and was later made an Honorary Fellow of the College.

After Cambridge, he joined the army, becoming a captain in the Royal Green Jackets.

From 1959 through 1966, he served with the Queen's Royal Rifles and achieved the rank of captain. He served as honorary colonel of the 4th Battalion, Royal Green Jackets from January 1996.

== Business ==
Pattie was a director at advertising agency Collett Dickenson Pearce from 1966 until 1979, as managing director from 1969 to 1973.

During the 1990s he held several senior marketing positions in companies belonging to General Electric Company, including Marconi Defence Systems and was Marketing Director of the group itself from 1997 to 1999. Pattie was the founding Chairman of Strategic Communications Laboratories where he was also Director until he resigned from that position in 2008; the company offered "psychological warfare" services aimed at influencing elections, and later became known to a wider audience as a result of the Facebook–Cambridge Analytica data scandal involving its subsidiary. He was senior partner at Terrington Management retiring in December 2015.

== Public and political service ==
=== Greater London Council ===
In 1967 Pattie was elected to the Greater London Council as one of four councillors representing the London Borough of Lambeth. He served a single three-year term, stepping down in 1970.

=== Member of Parliament ===
After being beaten by Labour's Tom Driberg at Barking in 1966 and 1970, Pattie was elected as Member of Parliament for Chertsey and Walton in February 1974 – a seat he held until his retirement in May 1997.

=== Ministerial office ===
In May 1979, he was appointed Parliamentary Under Secretary of State for Defence (RAF). From January 1983 until September 1984 he was then appointed to Parliamentary Under Secretary of State for Defence Procurement and then served as Minister of State for Defence Procurement. He continued his public service as Minister of State for Industry until 1987, with responsibility for Science, Civil Aviation, Space and Technology. During his time in office he was actively involved in the initiation of a number of national and international technology projects. These included the Alvey Programme, which ceased when he left office after the 1987 General Election, and several projects of the European Commission, such as Eureka and ESPRIT.

He was appointed to the Privy Council in the 1987 New Year Honours.

Immediately after he left ministerial office he was created Knight Bachelor in the 1987 Birthday Honours List.

He was vice-chairman of the Conservative Party in 1990.

=== Voluntary roles ===
Pattie served as Chairman of the Intellectual Property Institute from 1994 to 1999, and served on the Board of Governors of the British Film Institute while serving as an MP.

== Personal life and death ==
Pattie was a practising Anglican and was a member of the General Synod of the Church of England from 1970 to 1975.

Pattie married Tuëma Eyre-Maunsell in 1960, and together they had two children. He died at home in Duncton, West Sussex, on 8 October 2024, at the age of 88.

== Awards ==
- In 1987, Pattie was appointed Knight Bachelor.
- Pattie was awarded the Silver Star Award by the International Strategic Studies Association for Outstanding Contributions to Strategic Progress.
- He was elected an Honorary Fellow of St Catharine's College, Cambridge in 2007.
