= James Walker =

James or Jim Walker may refer to:

== British politicians ==
- Sir James Walker, 2nd Baronet (1829–1899), British MP for Beverley
- Sir James Walker (colonial administrator) (1809–1885), Scottish colonial administrator
- James Walker (Labour politician) (1883–1945), British MP for Newport and Motherwell
- James Walker of Richmondhill (1837–1921), Scottish businessman and Lord Provost of Aberdeen
- James Walker (Exeter MP) (c. 1635–1692), English MP for Exeter

== Canadian politicians ==
- James Walker (Alberta politician) (1874–?), Canadian politician from Alberta
- James Walker (Canadian judge) (1756–1800), English-born lawyer, judge and politician in Lower Canada
- James Edgar Walker (1911–1989), Canadian politician from Ontario
- James H. Walker (1885–1954), Canadian politician in Alberta

== Australian politicians ==
- James Walker (Australian politician) (1841–1923), Scottish-born Australian banker and politician
- James Walker (New South Wales politician) (1785–1856), member of the New South Wales Legislative Council
- James Walker (Queensland politician) (1869–1939), lawyer; member of the Queensland Legislative Assembly for Ipswich

== US politicians ==
- James A. Walker (1832–1901), American military officer and politician
- James B. Walker (1812–1877), American politician in Michigan
- James D. Walker (1830–1906), American politician from Arkansas
- James Lorenzo Walker (1920–2003), American politician from Florida
- James N. Walker, member of the California State Assembly
- James P. Walker (1851–1890), American politician from Missouri
- James Phenix Walker (1935–1966), member of the Mississippi House of Representatives
- James Ronald Walker (1947–2022), member of the Georgia State Senate
- Jimmy Walker (1881–1946), mayor of New York City

== Sports ==
=== American football ===
- James Walker (linebacker) (born 1958), American football linebacker
- James Walker (American football player) (1890–1973), on the 1910 College Football All-America Team
- James J. Walker (American football) (1918–1975), American college football player and coach
- James Walker (American football coach) (born 1944), American college football coach for the Kentucky Thorobreds
- Jim Walker (American football coach) (born 1944), American football player and coach

=== Association football (soccer) ===
- Jim Walker (Scottish footballer) (1893–?), Scottish footballer
- Jim Walker (English footballer) (born 1947), English footballer
- James Walker (footballer, born 1987) (1987–2026), Antiguan footballer

=== Water sports ===
- James Walker (rower) (born 1949), Canadian Olympic rower
- Jim Walker (rower) (born 1968), British Olympic rower
- James Walker (canoeist) (born 1971), Australian sprint canoeist

=== Other sports ===
- James Walker (sportsman) (1859–1923), Scottish rugby footballer and cricketer
- James Higgs-Walker (1892–1979), English cricketer
- James Walker (cyclist) (1897–?), South African Olympic cyclist
- James Walker (alpine skier) (1926–1996), Australian Olympic skier
- James Walker (runner) (born 1954), Guamanian marathon runner
- James Walker (hurdler) (born 1957), American hurdler
- Jim Walker (darts player) (born 1959), Scottish darts player
- James Walker (Australian footballer) (born 1979), Australian rules footballer
- James Walker (cricketer, born 1981), English cricketer
- James Walker (racing driver) (born 1983), Jersey-born British racing driver

== Writers ==
- James Walker (writer/filmmaker) (born 1979), British writer and filmmaker
- James Walker (television writer) (1973–2015), Australian television writer
- James L. Walker (1845–1904), American individualist anarchist and writer

== Musicians ==
- James Walker (conductor) (1913–1988), Australian record producer and conductor
- Jim Walker (drummer) (born 1955), Canadian drummer for the UK band Public Image Ltd
- Jimmy Walker (drummer) (1941–2020), American drummer and singer for The Knickerbockers
- Jim Walker (flautist) (born 1944), American flutist and educator

== Artists ==
- James Alexander Walker (painter) (1831–1898), British painter of French descent
- James F. Walker (1913–1994), American graphic artist
- James Walker (engraver) (1748–1808), British mezzotint engraver

== Science & medicine ==
- James Walker (physician) (1720–1789), British physician
- James John Walker (entomologist) (1851–1939), English entomologist
- Sir James Walker (chemist) (1863–1935), Scottish chemist
- James Walker (engineer) (1781–1862), Scottish civil-engineer
- James Pattison Walker (1823–1906), British surgeon in the Indian Medical Service
- James C. G. Walker (1939-2022), South African-American geophysicist

== Other fields ==
- James Walker (actor) (1940–2017), British actor
- James Walker (bishop) (1770–1841), Anglican bishop of Edinburgh
- James Walker (Harvard) (1794–1874), American minister and educator, president of Harvard College
- James Walker (RCAF officer) (1918–1944), Canadian flying ace
- James Walker (Royal Navy officer) (1764–1831), British naval officer
- James Walker (surveyor general) (1826–1896), Anglo-Indian surveyor general of India
- James Backhouse Walker (1841–1899), Australian solicitor and historian
- James Campbell Walker (1821–1888), Scottish architect
- James Flood Walker (1868–1924), American architect
- Jimmie Walker (born 1947), American comedian and actor
- James Dent Walker (1928–1993), founder and president of the Afro-American Historical and Genealogical Society
- James C. Walker (1843–1923), American soldier and Medal of Honor recipient
- James Alonzo Walker (1918–2004), American aviator
- James Hamlin Walker (1862–1944), New Zealand politician, mayor of Dunedin
- James W. St. G. Walker (born 1940), Canadian professor of history
- Colonel James Walker (1846–1936), Canadian policeman, military officer and pioneer
- James John Walker (1846–1922), businessman; see J. W. Walker & Sons Ltd, organ makers

== See also ==
- Jimmy Walker (disambiguation)
- Jamie Walker (disambiguation)
- Mount James Walker, in Alberta Canada
- James Walker Log House, in Texas, United States
- James Walker Nursing School Quarters in North Carolina, United States
- James E. Walker Library, in Tennessee, United States
- Walker (surname)
