= Jerktown =

Jerktown or Jerk town may refer to:

- Water stop on railroad line
- "Jerk Town", a 1965 single by The Knickerbockers
