= Jamie Walker =

Jamie Walker may refer to:

- Jamie Walker (baseball) (born 1971), American baseball pitcher
- Jamie Walker (bowls) (born 1991), England bowls player
- Jamie Walker (footballer) (born 1993), Scottish footballer
- Jamie Walker (minister), Church of Scotland minister
- Jamie Walker (Hollyoaks), Hollyoaks character

== See also ==
- James Walker (disambiguation)
