= Tony Bird =

Tony Bird may refer to:

- Tony Bird (singer-songwriter) (1945–2019), folk rock singer-songwriter
- Tony Bird (footballer, born 1910), who played for Plymouth Argyle and Newport County
- Tony Bird (footballer, born 1974), who played for Cardiff City and Swansea City

== See also ==
- Anthony Bird (1931–2016), British Anglican priest, physician and academic
