= El Viaje Misterioso de Nuestro Jomer (The Mysterious Voyage of Homer) =

- The Simpsons episode
- Episode no.: Season 8 Episode 9
- Directed by: Jim Reardon
- Written by: Ken Keeler
- Production code: 3F24
- Original air date: January 5, 1997

Guest appearance
- Johnny Cash as the spirit guide

Episode features
- Couch gag: The family parachutes to the couch; Homer's parachute fails, sending him plummeting.
- Commentary: Matt Groening; Josh Weinstein; Jim Reardon; George Meyer

Episode chronology
| ← Previous "Hurricane Neddy" | Next → "The Springfield Files" |
- The Simpsons season 8

"El Viaje Misterioso de Nuestro Jomer (The Mysterious Voyage of Our Homer)", (Spanish pronunciation: [el ˈβjaxe misteˈɾjoso ðe ˈnwestɾo xoˈmeɾ]) additionally known simply by its translation, is the ninth episode of the eighth season of the American animated television series The Simpsons. It originally aired on Fox in the United States on January 5, 1997. In the episode, Homer eats some hot chili peppers at Springfield’s annual chili cook-off and hallucinates from them. Following this, he questions his relationship with Marge and sets out to find his true soulmate.

This episode was written by Ken Keeler and directed by Jim Reardon and explores themes of marriage, community and alcohol usage. Homer's hallucination features surreal animation and Johnny Cash guest stars as the "Space Coyote".

== Plot ==
Marge is being suspiciously cautious when distracting Homer from an unspecified event, which is soon revealed to be Springfield's annual chili cook-off. Once Homer eventually discovers that the cook-off is going on when he steps outside, Marge finally confesses that she has been trying to dissuade Homer from going due to his drunken antics from its previous year; she agrees to let him attend the cook-off after he promises not to drink.

Once there, Homer showcases his extraordinary ability to withstand spicy food, except for the "Guatemalan insanity peppers" that Chief Wiggum uses in his chili. Trying to quench the spiciness with beer, Homer is caught by Marge, who accuses him of breaking his promise. After nearly drinking melted candle wax by mistake, Homer then gets the idea of using the wax to coat and protect his mouth, enabling him to swallow several peppers whole.

Homer begins to hallucinate wildly from the peppers. During his trip, he meets his spirit guide in the form of a coyote, who advises him to find his soulmate and questions Homer's assumption that Marge is his. Helen Lovejoy tells Marge about Homer's antics; under the impression that they were alcohol-induced, an upset Marge returns home without him. After awakening at a golf course the next day, Homer returns home to find Marge furious over his embarrassing behavior at the cook-off, leading to him making note of their fundamental personality differences and questioning if they truly are soulmates.

Roaming the streets that night, Homer believes a lonely lighthouse keeper is his true soulmate, only to discover that the lighthouse is operated by a machine. Seeing a ship approaching, he sabotages the lighthouse's light, hoping its passengers will befriend him once their ship crashes ashore. A remorseful Marge arrives, having known exactly where Homer would go, and they reconcile after realizing they truly are soulmates despite their differences. Following their hasty repair of the lighthouse’s light, the ship runs aground nearby and spills its cargo of hotpants, whereupon Springfield's populace happily seize the contents as Homer and Marge embrace.

== Production ==
The butterfly in Homer's hallucination was created using 3D computer graphics.

The episode was pitched as early as the series' third season by George Meyer, who was interested in an episode based on the works of Carlos Castaneda. Meyer had wanted to have an episode featuring a mystical voyage that was not induced by drugs and so he decided to use "really hot" chili peppers instead. The staff, except for Matt Groening, felt it was too odd for the series at that point. Bill Oakley and Josh Weinstein eventually recovered the story and decided to use it for the eighth season.

Most of the hallucination sequence was animated completely by David Silverman, who did not want the risk of sending it to South Korea and wanted it to look exactly as he had imagined it, including rendered backgrounds to give a soft mystical feel to the scene. The coyote was intentionally drawn in a boxier way so that it looked "other-worldly" and unlike the other characters. During Homer's voyage, the clouds in one shot are live-action footage and 3D computer graphics was used for the giant butterfly. During the same hallucination, Ned Flanders' line was treated on a Mac computer so that it increased and decreased pitch.

The Fox censors sent a note to the writers, questioning Homer coating his mouth with hot wax. The note read: "To discourage imitation by young and foolish viewers, when Homer begins to pour hot wax into his mouth, please have him scream in pain so kids will understand that doing this would actually burn their mouths." The scream was not added; however, they did add dialog from Ralph Wiggum, questioning Homer on his action. Reardon also created a "wax-chart" of Homer for the animators to follow during the sequence when Homer's mouth is coated with candle-wax.

Homer finding himself at a golf course is a reference to something that actually happened: a friend of the producers blacked out and found himself at a golf course. He had to buy a map from a 7-Eleven to find out where he was and discovered that not only was he in a different town, he was also in a different state. He walked several miles to return to a friend's house, which was the last place he remembered being the night before.

Johnny Cash and Bob Dylan were the writers' top two choices to play the coyote; the writers had wanted to use one of The Highwaymen as the voice of the spirit guide. Dylan had turned the series down many times, having previously been offered a role in the season seven episode "Homerpalooza". Cash was soon offered the role, which he accepted. Groening described Cash's appearance as "one of the greatest coups the show has ever had".

== Cultural references ==
The main plot of the episode is based on the works of Carlos Castaneda, with some of the Native American imagery being similar to that used in Dances with Wolves. The main theme from The Good, the Bad and the Ugly is used during the scenes when Homer is at the chili cook-off and "At Seventeen" by Janis Ian plays in the background as Homer walks through Springfield searching for his true soulmate. The scene at the end of Homer's hallucination, when a ghostly train is heading towards him, is a reference to the opening titles of Soul Train. The lighthouse keeper actually being a machine is a reference to The Twilight Zone episode "The Old Man in the Cave", in which the titular subject turns out to be a computer. Homer's record collection features albums by Jim Nabors, Glen Campbell and The Doodletown Pipers. "Short Shorts" by The Royal Teens plays over the end credits.

== Reception ==
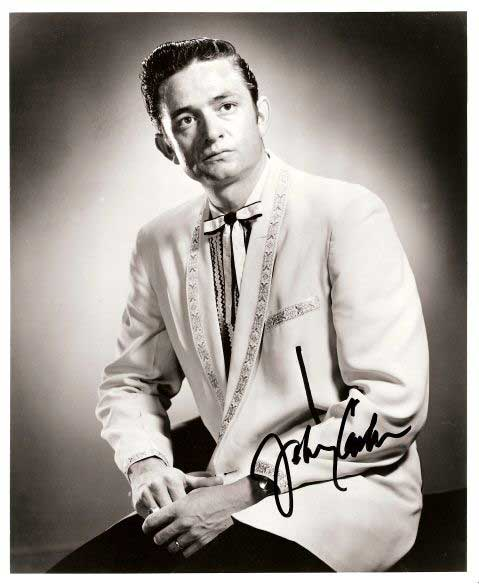
Johnny Cash has been named by several critics as one of the best guest voices in The Simpsons history.

In its original broadcast, "El Viaje Misterioso de Nuestro Jomer (The Mysterious Voyage of Homer)" finished 34th in ratings for the week of December 30, 1996 – January 5, 1997, with a Nielsen rating of 9.0, equivalent to approximately 8.7 million viewing households. It was the highest-rated show on the Fox network that week.

The authors of the book I Can't Believe It's a Bigger and Better Updated Unofficial Simpsons Guide, Gary Russell and Gareth Roberts, said: "Homer's chili-induced trip is brilliant, complete with the surreal tortoise and Indian spirit guide." The episode was placed eighth on AskMen.com's "Top 10: Simpsons Episodes" list, and in his book Planet Simpson, Chris Turner named the episode as being one of his five favorites, although he found the ending too sentimental. In 2019, Time ranked the episode seventh in its list of 10 best Simpsons episodes picked by Simpsons experts.

In 2011, Keith Plocek of LA Weekly's Squid Ink blog listed "El Viaje Misterioso de Nuestro Jomer (The Mysterious Voyage of Homer)" as the best episode of the show with a food theme.

IGN ranked Johnny Cash's performance as the 14th-best guest appearance in the show's history. Cash also appeared on AOL's list of their 25 favorite The Simpsons guest stars, and on The Times' Simon Crerar's list of the 33 funniest cameos in the history of the show. Andrew Martin of Prefix Mag named Cash his third-favorite musical guest on The Simpsons out of a list of ten.

Fred Topel of Crave Online named it the best episode of the entire series.

In The A.V. Club, Oliver Sava writes that "The spirit quest sequence is one of animator David Silverman's finest moments on the show." He also praises Cash's performance: "He's the perfect casting choice for Homer's spirit guide, with a deep, commanding voice that fully captures the immense gravity of the character's words. When you have Johnny Cash saying something, it sounds important, and that natural authority makes his humorous lines even funnier." Of the story, Sava writes: "Because this kind of thing has happened so many times in the past, the viewer can sympathize with Marge's feelings, but we've also seen the love between the spouses in their best moments, so we want them to find their way back to each other. And they do, because this is a love that is truly written in the stars."

== In other media ==
The episode was later adapted for the Simpsons Level Pack in Traveller's Tales' 2015 video game Lego Dimensions as the exclusive level for Homer Simpson, reusing audio from the episode for Cash as the Space Coyote and series lead Dan Castellaneta as Homer.
