= Tamori Club =

- Presented by: Tamori
- Opening theme: Short Shorts by The Royal Teens
- Country of origin: Japan

Production
- Running time: 24 minutes
- Production companies: TV Asahi; Tanabe Agency; How Full's Inc.

Original release
- Network: ANN (TV Asahi)
- Release: October 8, 1982 – April 1, 2023

Tamori Club (タモリ倶楽部, Tamori Kurabu; full title: Tamori Club: for the sophisticated people) was a late-night variety program hosted by comedian Kazuyoshi Morita, better known as Tamori. It was broadcast in Japan on the TV Asahi network. It aired from 8 October 1982 to 1 April 2023, and is one of the longest-running programs in Japan. This program deals with social phenomena from original, maniac viewpoints. Due to its "low budget" (not really true, but a running joke on the show), it has no stage sets, and almost all of the shooting is done on location.

== Guests ==
Though this is a midnight program, many celebrities are fond of this program and want opportunities to appear on it. The show's regular feature “Soramimi Hour” where misconstrued song lyrics are set to amusing videos is hosted by Tamori and Hajime Anzai, has also become famous in its own right.

== Opening ==
In a famous opening video, many women with shorts shake their hips along with "Short Shorts" by The Royal Teens. Then the program is introduced by Tamori with his customary speech, “This is the familiar wandering program, Tamori Club.” (毎度おなじみ流浪の番組、タモリ倶楽部でございます) Instead of a single theme overlying the entire series, various topics are addressed in each episode; this “no principle” is one of the program's main attractions. However, most topics that have been picked are subcultural matters such as vehicles (especially railways), sex culture, technologies, foods and so on.

== See also ==
- Tamori
- Soramimi, a term for a type of comedy pioneered by the "Soramimi Hour" segment of Tamori Club
