= James Alexander Walker =

James Alexander Walker may refer to:

- James A. Walker (1832–1901), Virginia lawyer, politician, and Confederate general
- James Alexander Walker (painter) (1831–1898), British painter of French descent
