= Stuart Airey =

Stuart Airey may refer to:

- Stuart Airey (cricketer) (born 1983), English cricketer
- Stuart Airey (bowls) (born 1971), English lawn bowler
