= Jimmy Walker (disambiguation) =

Jimmy Walker (1881–1946) was an American politician.

Jimmy Walker may also refer to:

- Jimmy Walker (basketball, born 1913) (1913–1943), American basketball coach
- Jimmy Walker (basketball, born 1944) (1944–2007), American basketball player
- Jimmy Walker (country musician) (1915–1990), American musician
- Jimmy Walker (drummer) (1941–2020), American drummer and singer for The Knickerbockers
- Jimmy Walker (footballer, born 1925) (1925–?), Scottish footballer
- Jimmy Walker (footballer, born 1932), Northern Irish footballer
- Jimmy Walker (footballer, born 1973), English footballer
- Jimmy Walker (golfer) (born 1979), American golfer
- Jimmy Walker (table tennis) (born 1954), English table tennis player

== See also ==
- James Walker (disambiguation), a disambiguation page for "James Walker"
- Jimmie Walker (born 1947), American comedian and actor
