= Doloroso =

Doloroso may refer to:

- doloroso, a musical term meaning "sorrowful" or "plaintive"
- Doloroso, Mississippi, a town in the United States
