= Peter Fisher (priest) =

Anglican priest

Peter Timothy Fisher (1944-2026) was an Anglican priest. He was prominent in activities of the World Council of Churches and Anglican-Roman Catholic relations.

Fisher was educated at Durham University and Ripon College, Cuddesdon. He was ordained in 1969. After a curacy at St Andrew, Bedford he was Chaplain at the University of Surrey. He was Principal of Lincoln Theological College from 1978 to 1983; and Rector of St Michael, Houghton-le-Spring from 1983 to 1994. Fisher was Principal of Queen's College, Birmingham from 1994 to 2002. After that he was Vicar of St Peter, Maney from 2002 to 2010. He died on 16 March 2026.

== Bibliography ==
- Outside Eden: Finding Hope In An Imperfect World (SPCK, 2009) ISBN 9780281059959
