= David Hewlett (priest) =

English Anglican priest

David Jonathon Peter Hewlett (born 8 February 1957) is a British Anglican priest, Methodist minister, and academic specialising in practical theology. Since 2003, he has served as Principal of The Queen's Foundation, an ecumenical theological college in Birmingham. He previously served in parish ministry in the Diocese of St Albans and the Diocese of Truro, and taught at the Church of Ireland Theological Institute, at Trinity College, Dublin, on the South West Ministry Training Course, and at the University of Exeter.
