= Herbert Raison =

Herbert Chaplain Raison (13 November 1889, in Wyke Regis – 29 September 1952, in Doncaster) was an Anglican priest in the twentieth century.

Raison was educated at St John's College, Oxford and Ely Theological College. He was ordained to Rugby Parish Church in 1913; and priested in 1914. He served a further curacy at St George, Leicester before becoming Chaplain of Malvern College in 1917. He was Vice-Principal and Bursar of Warminster Theological College from 1919 to 1922; and Principal of Queen's College, Birmingham from 1923 to 1934. He was Vicar of St Luke, Paddington from 1934 to 1936 and then Rector of Rector of St Peter, Doncaster until his death.
