= Debra Newman Ham =

American archivist

Debra Newman Ham (born August 27, 1948) is an American archivist and retired professor in the field of history.

== Education ==
Ham grew up in York, Pennsylvania and graduated from York High School. She received a BA in history from Howard University in 1970 and received her Masters from Boston University in 1971. She also completed a PhD at Howard University.

== Career ==
After graduating, she spent the summer as an intern at the National Archives. In 1972, Ham began work as an archivist and Black History Specialist at the National Archives. While there, she helped co-found the Afro-American Historical and Genealogical Society in 1977. She also compiled and prepared finding aids for the Social Security Administration, the Office of Economic Opportunity and the Department of Labor.

In 1986 she moved to the Library of Congress, working as the specialist in African American History and Culture in the Manuscript Division. Under her care were papers of influential people such as Booker T. Washington, Frederick Douglass and Thurgood Marshall. While at the Library of Congress, she was the curator of the exhibit, "African American Odyssey: Quest for Full Citizenship," and edited the catalog of the exhibit.

In 1995, she left the Library of Congress to become a professor of history at Morgan State University, a position she held til her retirement in 2016. Her special interests include the study of African Americans, women, public history and archival methods. She commands her classrooms and even takes students on visits to local archives and museums. She is passionate about putting African Americans in the narrative and not treating them as victims. Instead, "I plan to focus on African Americans as overcomers.”

She has worked to disrupt the myth that black history isn't taught because of a lack of records. She states in an interview with Jim McClure, “There is an unbelievable ocean of African-American history resources for people who are interested in viewing them or studying them.”

One of her most well-known works is The African-American Mosaic which was published through the Library of Congress. The guide lists many examples of pieces at the Library of Congress that examine African-American life, including "government documents, manuscripts, books, photographs, recordings and films." Ham also includes work on African Americans, or by African Americans, from other notable historians. Many archivists and historians use her guide in the study of African American history.

When asked about her impact on the archival profession, she responded:

I would say that I honestly believe that the resources that I have provided in these 30 years of my doing historical work, the resources that I have identified have deepened and broadened the scope of African-American history … because my people didn’t know about the availability of these resources.

During her career, Ham served on a number of professional bodies. She was a member of the Association for the Study of African American Life and History, and served on the executive council from 1989 and was national secretary from 1992. She was on the editorial board of the Society of American Archivists from 1989 and she was publications director of the Association of Black Women Historians from 1986-1990. Ham was also involved with the Oral History Association.

=== Recognition ===
In 2011, Ham received an Avoice award from the Congressional Black Caucus Foundation, for excellence in historical research. Her publication Black History: A Guide has won several awards, including awards from the Society of American Archives and the Mid-Atlantic Regional Archives Conference.

== Publications ==
- The African-American Mosaic: A Guide to Black History Resources in the Library of Congress (1993)
- Black History: A Guide to Civilian Records in the National Archives (1984)
- Catalog Guide for Exhibit, 'The African American Odyssey' (1998)
- "African-American Activist Mary Church Terrell and the Brownsville Disturbance" (Trotter Review: Vol. 18 : Iss. 1, 2009)
- "Resource Guide," Columbia University Guide to African American History since 1960 (2006)
- "Government Documents,'' in the Harvard Guide to African-American History (2001)
- "Jesus and Justice: Nannie Helen Burroughs and the Struggle for Civil Rights," in Humanity and Society (1988)
- "Black Women Workers in the Twentieth Century," in Sage: A Scholarly Journal on Black Women (1986)
- "Black Women in Pennsylvania in the Era of the American Revolution," in the Journal of Negro History (1976)
- "The Emergence of Liberian Women in the Nineteenth Century," (Howard Doctoral Dissertation, 1984).
