= The Queen's Foundation =

Theological college in Birmingham, England

Coordinates: 52.4573°N 1.9314°W

The Queen's Foundation, Birmingham
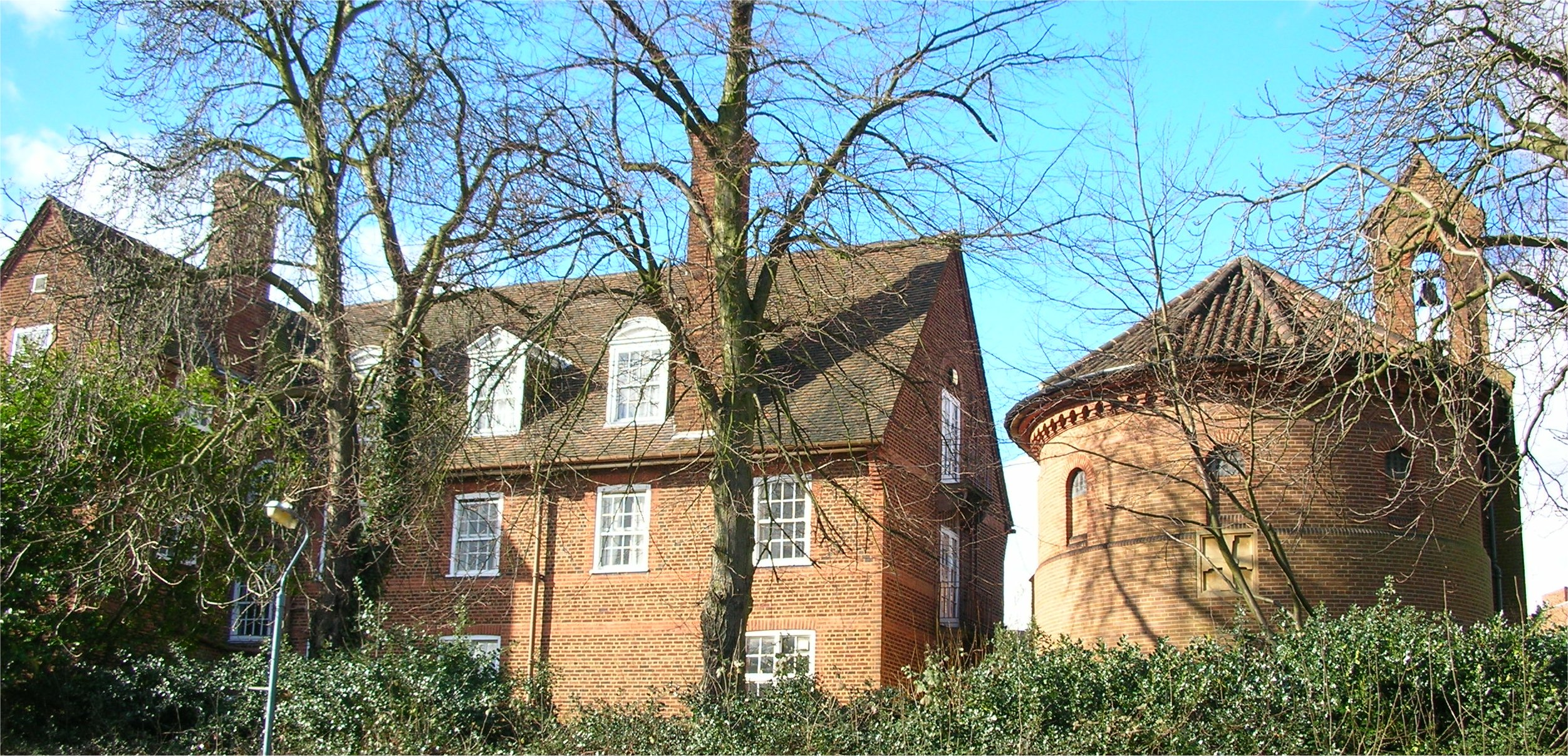
- The Hobbiss main block and chapel
- Other name: The Queen's Foundation for Ecumenical Theological Education
- Former names: Queen's College, Birmingham
- Type: Theological college
- Established: 1828; 198 years ago
- Religious affiliation: Church of England; Methodist Church; United Reformed Church
- Principal: Anne Hollinghurst
- Dean: Dr David Allen
- Address: Somerset Road, Edgbaston, Birmingham, B15 2QH, England
- Website: www.queens.ac.uk

The Queen's Foundation for Ecumenical Theological Education (also called the Queen's Foundation, Birmingham, and formerly the Queen's College, Birmingham) is an ecumenical theological college which serves the Church of England, the Methodist Church and other denominations, including Black Majority Churches. Its courses thus have a strong ecumenical emphasis.

== Overview ==
The Queen's Foundation itself consists of the Centre for Ministerial Formation, the Queen's Graduate and Research Centre, the Centre for Black Ministries and Leadership, and the Selly Oak Centre for Mission Studies (the successor to the Selly Oak Colleges).

The Queen's Foundation was associated with the University of Birmingham (then, the Queen's College, Birmingham) to which it is very near and for whose certificates, diplomas and degrees students read. However, in 2009/10 the University of Birmingham completed its review of the School of Philosophy, Theology and Religion, including its collaborative arrangements. The review recommended terminating the arrangements with Queen's for both taught and research degrees. A new validation agreement was made with Newman University for taught degree programmes. Also in 2011 a new validation agreement was made with the University of Gloucestershire for research degrees. The Queen's Graduate and Research Centre offers post-graduate study for the Master of Arts (MA) in applied theological study, and research facilities for the degrees of Master of Philosophy (Ph.M.), Doctor of Theology (Th.D.) and Doctor of Philosophy (Ph.D.).

The residential block and lodge (1929–30), and chapel (1938–47) are by a local architect Holland W. Hobbiss. The chapel was the first English ecclesiastical building with an altar built for the celebrant to face the congregation. The college hosted the UKMT Mathematics Summer School each summer for approximately 40 students.

== Origins ==
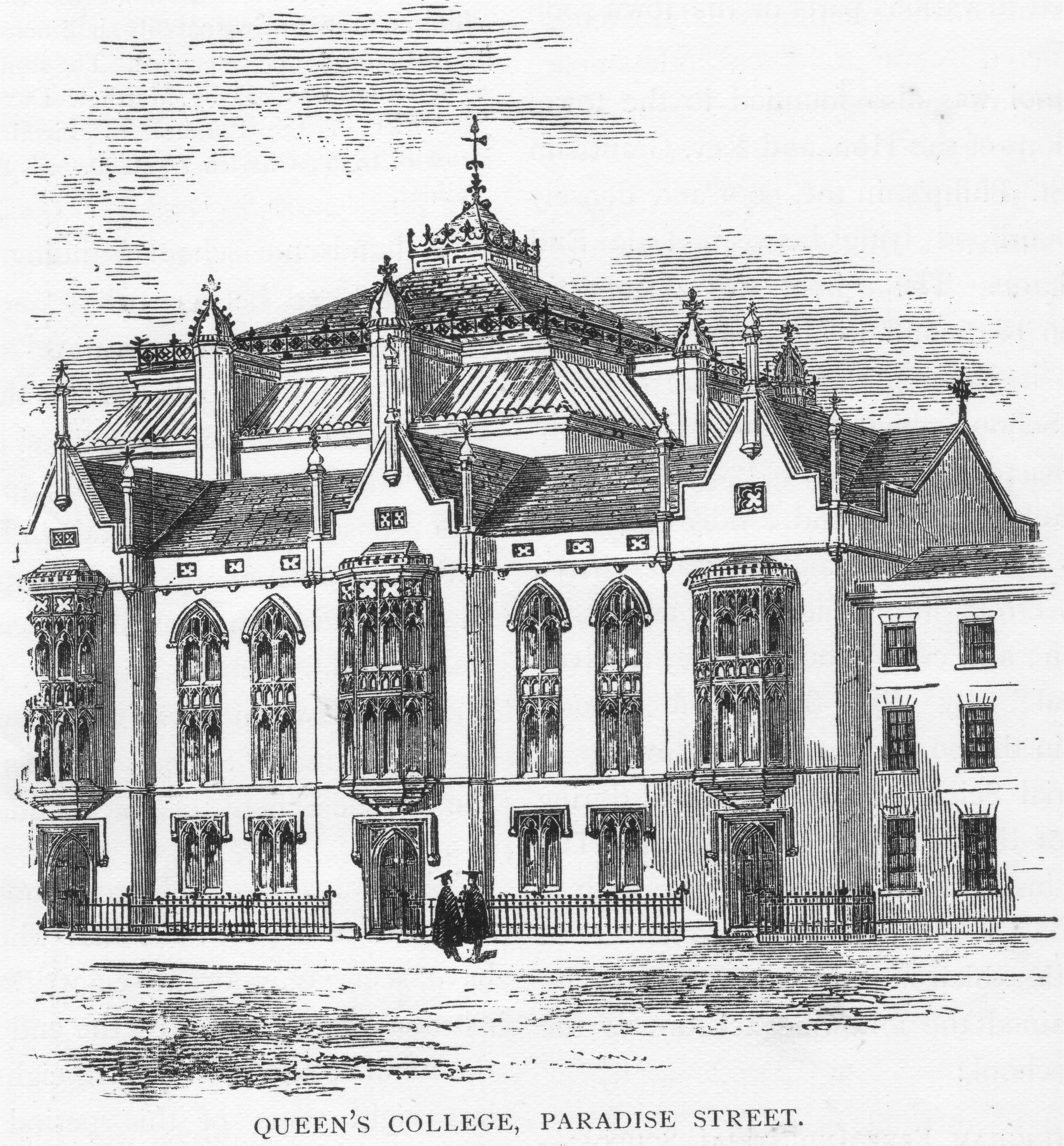
The original Queen's College in Paradise Street, Central Birmingham

The college started in 1828 as the Birmingham School of Medicine, based at Birmingham General Hospital, moving to Snow Hill in 1829 and then Paradise Street in 1834. In 1836 it became the Birmingham Royal School of Medicine and Surgery, under the patronage of William IV. In 1843 the institution moved from being a medical school to a college and obtained a royal charter as Queens' College. A theology department was established in 1849 and opened in 1853. Eventually the non-theological departments joined the nearby Mason Science College which became the University of Birmingham in 1900, leaving Queen's College as a theological establishment, which moved to Somerset Road in 1923.

The Selly Oak Centre for Mission Studies was formed in 2006 as the successor to the United College of the Ascension, one the former Selly Oak Colleges, and remains sponsored by the United Society for the Propagation of the Gospel and the Methodist Church.

== List of wardens of the Theological Department of the Queen's College ==
- 1849-1852: Horace Gray
- 1853-1865: John Sandford
- 1865-1873: Thomas Espinell Espin
- 1873-1874: Harman Chaloner Ogle
- 1874-1901: William Herring Poulton
- 1902-1907 :J H B Masterman
- 1907-1913?: W Hobhouse (Honorary Warden, college activities suspended until 1923)

== List of principals since 1923 ==
The principal of the theological foundation has usually been an ordained Anglican priest.

- 1923–1934 (res.): Herbert Raison
- 1934–1954 (res.): John Cobham
- 1954–1967 (res.): Arthur Gribble
- 1967–1973 (res.): John Habgood
- 1974–1979 (res.): Anthony Bird
- 1979–1987 (res.): Gordon Wakefield (Methodist minister)
- 1987–1993 (res.): Jamie Walker (Church of Scotland (presbyterian) minister)
- 1994–2002 (res.): Peter Fisher
- 2003–2020: David Hewlett
- 2020–2024: Clive Marsh
- 2024–Pres: Anne Hollinghurst (Church of England Bishop)

== Notable alumni ==
- Simon Baker, Archdeacon of Lichfield
- Paul Bayes, Bishop of Liverpool
- Michael Everitt, Archdeacon of Lancaster
- John Hawkins, Archdeacon of Hampstead
- Sonia Hicks, President of the Methodist Conference 2021/2022
- Rose Hudson-Wilkin, Bishop of Dover
- Kathy Jones, Dean of Bangor 2016–2021
- Clinton Langston, British Army Chaplain General and Archdeacon for the Army
- Karen Lund, Archdeacon of Manchester
- Rachel Mann, Archdeacon of Salford & Bolton, priest, poet and theologian
- Michael Parker, British Army Chaplain General
- Eve Pitts, vicar and canon in Birmingham
- Mary Stallard, Archdeacon of Bangor since 2018 and Assistant Bishop in Bangor since 2022
- David Walker, Bishop of Manchester
- Lucy Winkett, priest, broadcaster and writer
