= Stuart Airey (cricketer) =

English cricketer (born 1983)

Personal information
- Full name: Stuart James Airey
- Born: 18 March 1983 (age 43); Cleethorpes, Lincolnshire, England
- Batting: Right-handed
- Bowling: Right-arm medium-fast

Domestic team information
- Years: Team
- 2003–2005: Oxford UCCE
- 2001–present: Lincolnshire

Career statistics
Competition	First-class	List A
Matches	9	1
Runs scored	272	2
Batting average	34.00	–
100s/50s	–/–	–/–
Top score	72	2*
Balls bowled	872	42
Wickets	6	2
Bowling average	104.33	11.00
5 wickets in innings	–	–
10 wickets in match	–	–
Best bowling	2/32	2/22
Catches/stumpings	3/–	–/–
- Source: Cricinfo, 23 June 2011

Stuart James Airey (born 18 March 1983) is an English first-class cricketer. Airey is right-handed batsman who bowled right-arm medium-fast. He was born in Cleethorpes, Lincolnshire.

Airey made his debut for Lincolnshire in the 2001 MCCA Knockout Trophy against Cheshire. Airey has played Minor counties cricket for Lincolnshire from 2001 to present, which has included 24 Minor Counties Championship matches and 37 MCCA Knockout Trophy matches. He made his List A appearance for Lincolnshire against Norfolk in the 1st round of the 2004 Cheltenham & Gloucester Trophy which was played in 2003. He scored 2 unbeaten runs and took the wickets of Carl Rogers and James Walker for the cost of 22 runs from 7 overs.

Airey also played first-class cricket for Oxford UCCE, making his first-class debut for the team against Middlesex in 2003. He played a further 8 first-class matches, the last coming against Lancashire in 2005. In his 9 first-class matches, he scored 272 runs at an average of 34.00, while he made a lone half century score of 72 which came against Nottinghamshire in 2004. With the ball, Airey took 6 wickets which came at an expensive average of 104.33, with best figures of 2/32.
