= Afro-American Historical and Genealogical Society =

American nonprofit organization

The Afro-American Historical and Genealogical Society (AAHGS) is a Washington, D.C.–based organization which pursues scholarly and educational work on the genealogy and history of African American citizens. It was founded in May 1977, with James Dent Walker serving as its first president. Other founding officers included Marcia Jesiek Eisenberg, Marsha M. Greenlee, Paul Edward Sluby, Sr., Debra Newman Ham, Elizabeth Clark-Lewis, and Jean Sampson Scott. It currently serves 32 state chapters and a chapter for the District of Columbia, and it is a member society of the Federation of Genealogical Societies.

The AAHGS publishes a scholastic journal on its members' work in the field of African American genealogy.

Nearly all 32 chapters of the AAHGS participated in the Freedmen's Bureau project to digitize the records of the Bureau for online access.

== Notable people ==
- Sherri Camp, is the current president and a native of Topeka, Kansas.
- Catherine Stokes, is a retired deputy director of the Illinois Department of Public Health and a community volunteer. She is a pioneering African-American member of the Church of Jesus Christ of Latter-day Saints.
