= Catherine Stokes =

Member of The Church of Jesus Christ of Latter-day Saints

Catherine Moore Stokes (born 1936) is a pioneering African-American member of the Church of Jesus Christ of Latter-day Saints (LDS Church). She is also a retired assistant deputy director of the Illinois Department of Public Health and a community volunteer.

== Biography ==
Stokes was born in Doloroso, Mississippi as the youngest daughter of six in a family of sharecroppers. Her maternal grandfather was descended from a plantation owner and a former slave. After a challenging childhood, which included her father being shot and wounded in a fight, Stokes moved to Chicago when she was five to live with a great aunt. She lived in Chicago much of her life and became the first member of her family to graduate from college. She attended Hyde Park High School, graduating in 1954, and won a scholarship to the Michael Reese Hospital School of Nursing. She obtained a bachelor's degree in nursing from DePaul University. She worked as a public health nurse in Chicago, as a health planning administrator with the Illinois Comprehensive State Health Planning Agency, and as assistant deputy director for the Bureau of Hospitals and Ambulatory Services at the Illinois Department of Public Health. She retired in 2006.

== Conversion to the LDS Church ==
Stokes was formerly a member of the Baptist, Catholic and Unity churches. She converted to the LDS Church in 1979, attracted to what she saw as a "do-it-yourself" church whose members were committed to living their faith. While in Hawaii for a business conference Stokes visited the Laie Hawaii Temple and filled out a visitor card. LDS Church missionaries visited her in Chicago and she began attended the local congregation. Stokes was baptized on April 28, 1979, at the church's Hyde Park, Chicago meetinghouse. She later taught classes for those thinking about converting to the LDS Church and served as president of the Relief Society for women. In 1988, she was one of eight African-American Mormons speaking in panel discussions on the 10 year anniversary of the 1978 Revelation on Priesthood. In 1989, at the request of Neal A. Maxwell, Stokes traveled to Ghana with another African-American LDS member. There, they met with government officials and successfully petitioned for the prohibition on LDS Church activities to be lifted. Stokes featured in a 1996 film of interviews of "well-known LDS personalities" from different areas of public life. In 2010, she was named as a member of the Editorial Advisory Board for the Deseret News. She is considered a pioneer for African-Americans and continues to be an advocate for minorities in the LDS Church, and to speak against racism, racist teachings in the LDS Church and racist violence in society.

== Civic work ==
Stokes has participated in volunteer, civic, and activist work, including serving as vice chairman of the board of trustees of the Chicago Inner City Youth Charitable Foundation for 16 years, as a member of the Utah AIDS Foundation board of trustees, and on the board of the Salt Lake City Public Library. She has also been chairperson of the Utah chapter of the Afro-American Historical and Genealogical Society.

== Personal life ==
Stokes has one daughter and lives in Salt Lake City, Utah.
