= The Knickerbockers =

American rock band

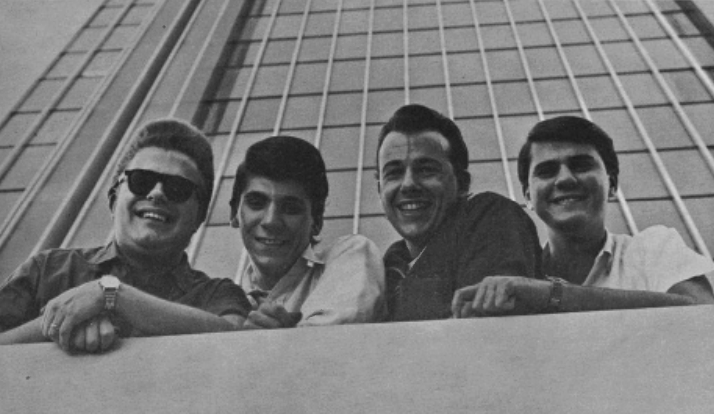
- The Knickerbockers in 1965. Left to right: Buddy Randell, Beau Charles, Jimmy Walker, John Charles.

Background information
- Origin: Bergenfield, New Jersey, U.S.
- Genres: Garage rock; pop rock; beat
- Years active: 1964–1970; 1983; 1990
- Labels: Challenge; Sundazed
- Past members: Beau Charles; John Charles; Skip Cherubino; Ned Brown; Peter Glitz; Buddy Randell; Jimmy Walker; Richie Walker; Barry McCoy; John Deleone; Pete LoCasio; Ritchie Costanza; Eric Swanson; Glenn Henry

The Knickerbockers were an American garage rock band formed in Bergenfield, New Jersey, in 1964. They released the 1965 hit "Lies", which was known for its resemblance to the Beatles. The band was formed in 1964 by the brothers Beau Charles (guitar and vocals) and John Charles (bass and vocals) (birth names: Robert and John Carlos Cecchino respectively)

== History ==
=== Formation ===
The Charles brothers played with a fluctuating personnel until 1964, when they met Buddy Randell (vocals and sax) (birth name: William Crandall). Randell was previously of the Rockin' Saints and The Royal Teens, who had a hit with "Short Shorts" in 1958. They took their name from Knickerbocker Road (County Route 505), which runs through Tenafly, the next town to the east of Bergenfield.

The classic line-up consisted of Randell, the Charles brothers, and drummer Jimmy Walker (previously the drummer with the Massena, New York-based Atco Records act The Castle Kings). They were spotted by producer and singer-songwriter Jerry Fuller playing the University Twist Palace in Albany, New York, and he signed them to Los Angeles-based Challenge Records.

=== Initial success ===
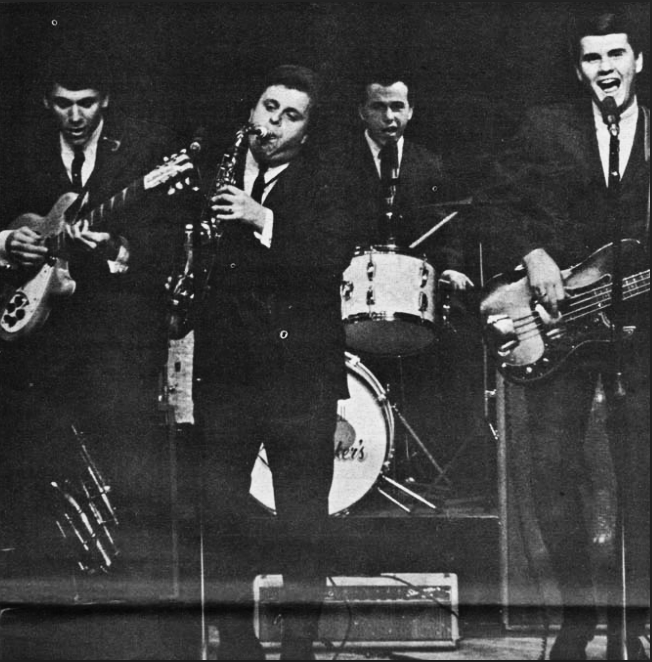
The Knickerbockers performing live on stage in 1965. Left to right: Beau Charles, Buddy Randell, Jimmy Walker, John Charles.

Throughout The Knickerbockers' three years of recordings, the group tirelessly pursued current trends; the vocals on "Jerk Town", for example, are heavily derivative of the Four Seasons. Furthermore, the song's lyrics refer to "hot rods", like many other popular songs of the day. The group had a top-20 hit in 1965 with "Lies", on which the group emulated the Beatles' harmonies and playing so perfectly that the record was often passed off to the unsuspecting as an actual Beatles cut.

The follow-up to "Lies" was "One Track Mind", which was nearly a hit as well. However, the band's label, Challenge Records, could not handle the distribution, and the single only reached number 45. The Knickerbockers soldiered on, appearing in the movie Out of Sight (1966) and as regulars on Dick Clark's ABC-TV program, Where the Action Is (1965–1967).

=== Decline ===
Though the band had a strong songwriter in Beau Charles, they were hampered by their label's shortcomings, and drummer Walker left in late 1968 to replace Bill Medley in The Righteous Brothers. Walker also recorded three solo singles for Columbia Records in 1968–1969, before retiring to Wyoming for much of the 1970s. Buddy Randell was the next to depart. The Charles brothers kept the band going by adding new members Richie Walker (vocals), Eric Swanson (drums), and Barry McCoy (keyboards). Randell rejoined The Knickerbockers on drums in 1968, leaving again in 1970 (McCoy departed to join Gary Puckett & The Union Gap). Randell later recorded singles for Uni Records ("Randi, Randi"/"Be My Baby" 1970) and under aliases such as Steel Wool ("No Sugar Tonight", White Whale 1969) and Blowtorch ("I Want Sugar all the Time" Paramount Records 1971). Beau Charles was also active outside of the group, recording "Sharon Stay in Birmingham" for White Whale Records under the alias of Columbus Jones in 1969. (Both of the White Whale and Uni Records singles were produced or co-produced by George Tobin, who later went on to produce and manage 1980s teenage singer Tiffany).

=== Other projects and reformation ===
Beau and John Charles, along with singer Ritchie Costanza and drummer Eric Swanson, were signed to Motown records in 1971, where their name was changed to Lodi, after another Bergen County town; Lodi is located somewhat southwest of Bergenfield. They recorded an album (released in 1972) and one single ("Happiness" / "I Hope I See it In My Lifetime") on the Mowest subsidiary, before splitting up.

The Charles brothers, Randell, and Swanson then briefly backed up Playboy Records artist Brenda Patterson in 1973–1974, most notably appearing on an episode of The Midnight Special. Beau Charles remained the most visible member of the band throughout the 1970s, appearing in an episode of Harry-O as a lounge singer, and performing on various film and television soundtracks.

Since then, The Knickerbockers have reformed twice. The first time was in 1983 in Los Angeles, with everyone except Buddy Randell (he was singing with the faith-based band Jerusalem Rivers at the time). They recorded demos with producer Jerry Fuller, but split up soon afterward. The band reformed one more time, performing for a month in Delray Beach, Florida, in 1990, before disbanding again.

The band's two most popular singles are on the box set Nuggets: Original Artyfacts from the First Psychedelic Era, 1965–1968, and there are numerous re-issues and rarity sets. A compilation album by the band is The Fabulous Knickerbockers, released on Sundazed Music. Beau and John Charles have been involved with The Knickerbockers' CD releases on Sundazed Music.

Saxophonist Buddy Randell died in 1998. Drummer Jimmy Walker died in 2020.

== Members ==
Members listed in Chronological order:
Note: Members of the 'classic lineup' that performed on "Lies" are texted in Bold

- **Beau Charles** – guitar, vocals (1962–1972, 1983, 1990)
- **John Charles** – bass, vocals (1962–1972, 1983, 1990)
- Skip Cherubino – drums (1962–1963)
- Ned Brown – keyboards (1962)
- Peter Glitz – drums (1963–1964)
- **Buddy Randell** – vocals, saxophone, drums (1964–1967, 1968–1970, 1990; died 1998)
- **Jimmy Walker** – drums, vocals (1964–1967, 1983, 1990; died 2020)
- Richie Walker – vocals (1967–1970)
- Barry McCoy – keyboards (1967–1968)
- John Deleone – drums (1967–1968)
- Pete LoCascio – drums (1962)
- Ritchie Costanza – vocals (1970–1972)
- Eric Swanson – drums (1970–1972)
- Glenn Henry – bass (1999-2000)

== Discography ==
=== Singles ===
- "All I Need is You" / "Bite Bite Barracuda" (Challenge 59268) 1964
- "Jerktown" / "Room for One More" (Challenge 59293) 1965
- "Lies" / "The Coming Generation" (Challenge 59321) 1965 U.S. No. 20; Canada No. 11
- "One Track Mind" / "I Must Be Doing Something Right" (Challenge 59326) 1966 U.S. No. 46; Canada No. 32
- "High on Love" / "Stick With Me" (Challenge 59332) 1966 U.S. No. 94; Canada No. 88
- "Chapel in the Fields" / "Just One Girl" (Challenge 59335) 1966
- "Love is a Bird" / "Rumors, Gossip, Words Untrue" (Challenge 59341) 1966 - Canada No. 85
- "Please Don't Love Him" / "Can You Help Me" (Challenge 59348) 1966
- "What Does That Make You?" / "Sweet Green Fields" (Challenge 59359) 1967
- "Come and Get It" / "Wishful Thinking" (Challenge 59366) 1967
- "I Can Do It Better" / "You'll Never Walk Alone" (Challenge 59380) 1967
- "A Matter of Fact" / "They Ran For Their Lives" (Challenge 59384) 1968
- "Happiness" / "Hope I See it In My Lifetime" (as LODI) (MoWest 5003) 1971
- "All I Need is You" / "Jerktown" (reissue) (Sundazed unknown) 1989
- "Gotta Stop This Dreaming" / "I Want a Girl for Christmas" (Sundazed SEP 186) 2006

=== EPs ===
- "Lies" / "The Coming Generation" / "One Track Mind" / "I Must Be Doing Something Right" (London 10178) 1966

=== Albums ===
- Lloyd Thaxton Presents.... (Challenge 1264) 1965
- Jerk & Twine Time (Challenge 621) 1966
- Lies (Challenge 622) 1966 U.S. No. 134
- Lodi (MoWest MW 101L) 1972
- The Fabulous Knickerbockers! (Sundazed) 1989
- The Great Lost Knickerbockers Album! (Sundazed) 1992
- Hits, rarities, unissued cuts and more... (Sundazed) 1997
- Rockin' with the Knickerbockers! (Sundazed 5154) 2006
