= Arthur Gribble =

Arthur Stanley Gribble (18 August 1904 - 9 March 2002) was an Anglican priest in the twentieth century.

Gribble was educated at Ulverston Grammar School; Queens' College, Cambridge; and Westcott House, Cambridge. He was ordained deacon in 1930; and priest in 1931. He served curacies in Windermere and Almondbury. He was Chaplain of Sarum Theological College from 1936 to 1938; Rector of Shepton Mallet, 1938–54; Principal of Queen's College, Birmingham from 1954 to 1967 (and a Lecturer at the University of Birmingham); and Canon Residentiary and Chancellor of Peterborough Cathedral from 1967 to 1979. During his time at Peterborough he was recommended as a potential bishop, but was never appointed one.
