= Anthony Bird =

British Anglican priest, physician and academic

The Reverend Anthony Bird
- Principal of Queen's College, Birmingham
- Church: Church of England
- Diocese: Diocese of Birmingham
- In office: 1974 to 1979
- Predecessor: John Habgood
- Successor: Gordon Wakefield
- Other post: Vice-Principal of Cuddesdon College (1961–1964)

Orders
- Ordination: 1957 (deacon); 1958 (priest)

Personal details
- Born: Anthony Peter Bird; 1931 Wolverhampton, England
- Died: 16 May 2016 (aged 85)
- Denomination: Anglicanism
- Children: Three
- Education: St John's School, Leatherhead
- Alma mater: St John's College, Oxford; Cuddesdon College; University of Birmingham

Anthony Peter Bird (1931 – 2016) was a British Anglican priest, physician, and academic. From 1974 to 1979, he was Principal of Queen's College, Birmingham, an ecumenical theological college.

== Early life and education ==
Bird was born in 1931 in Wolverhampton, England. His father Harry was a parish priest, and his mother Noel (née Oakley) was a teacher. He was brought up in his father's vicarage in Shrewsbury, Shropshire. He was educated at St John's School, Leatherhead, a private school in Leatherhead, Surrey.

Bird studied classics at St John's College, Oxford, graduating with a Bachelor of Arts (BA) degree in 1954; as per tradition, his BA was promoted to a Master of Arts (MA Oxon) degree in 1957. He remained at St John's to study theology and graduated with a Bachelor of Theology (BTh) degree in 1955. He trained for ordination at Cuddesdon College, an Anglican theological college in the Anglo-Catholic tradition, between 1955 and 1957.

== Career ==
=== Ordained ministry ===
Bird was ordained in the Church of England as a deacon in 1957 and as a priest in 1958. He served his curacy at St Mary's Church, Stafford in the Diocese of Lichfield between 1957 and 1960. In 1960, he returned to his alma mater and was chaplain at Cuddesdon College for the next year. From 1961 to 1964, he was Vice-Principal of the theological college.

From 1964 to 1968, while studying medicine at the University of Birmingham, he was a curate at St Wulstan's Church, Bournbrook. From 1968 to 1979, he held permission to officiate in the Diocese of Birmingham in addition to his work as a GP and then as an academic. From 1974 to 1979, he was Principal of Queen's College, Birmingham, an ecumenical theological college. At Queen's College, he led seminars in ethics, in addition to training priests and ministers for a range of Christian denominations.

=== Medical career ===
Bird studied medicine at the University of Birmingham, and graduated with Bachelor of Medicine, Bachelor of Surgery (MBChB) degrees in 1970. He trained as a general practitioner (GP) and worked in the King's Norton area of Birmingham until he returned to academia in 1974. He once again became a full-time GP in 1979, and ran an "experimental medical practice" in Balsall Heath, Birmingham until he retired in 1996.

== Later life ==
From retirement until his death, Bird held permission to officiate in the Diocese of Birmingham. He died on 16 May 2016, aged 85 years, from pancreatic cancer. His funeral was held on 3 June 2016 at St Paul's Church, Balsall Heath.

== Personal life ==
Bird was twice married. He had three children with his first wife; Markus, Stephanie and Dominic. After divorcing, he married his second wife, Andrea.

Academic offices
Preceded by John Habgood	Principal of Queen's College, Birmingham; 1974 to 1979	Succeeded by Gordon Wakefield
