= James Dent Walker =

President of the Afro-American Historical and Genealogical Society

James Dent Walker (9 June 1928 - 6 October 1993) of Washington, DC was a genealogist, researcher, lecturer, teacher, and archivist known for his research in African American genealogy. He has written and lectured extensively on black genealogy and consulted many historical and genealogical organizations.

== Education ==
Walker grew up in Washington, D.C. and attended Cardozo, Dunbar and Armstrong high schools.

== Family ==
Walker was married to Barbara Dodson Walker, who remained an active member of the AAHGS after her husband's death, along with her family. He had four children with his wife: James Dent Walker, Jr., Althea Walker, Susan Walker and Barbara Walker Brissett.

== Career ==
Walker served in the U.S. Navy from 1947 to 1951 as Surveyor, Second Class, and served in the Korean War, participating in the amphibious landing at Inchon, South Korea in 1950. He was also a member of the Seabees, the U.S. Navy construction battalions.

Walker was the founding president of the Afro-American Historical and Genealogical Society (National), which grew to 23 chapters across the United States by 1999. He served in a variety of posts in the National Genealogical Society including program chairman and second vice president (1978-1980), and he also founded and was president of the District of Columbia Genealogical Society.

Walker worked for thirty years at the National Archives and Records Administration where he worked as a genealogist, research consultant, Supervisor of Military Records, Director of Local History and Genealogical Programs, and Assistant Director of the Institute of Genealogical Research at American University. He had an extensive knowledge of military and pension records from the period of American Revolutionary War to the American Civil War.

In his research, he was well-known for his ability to discover sources of African Americans. He was a specialist on black records that including information on birth, death and even the sale and transfer of slaves. He helped numerous people trace family members of African Americans whose ancestors were brought as slaves. He even assisted Alex Haley in his genealogical research which later inspired his best-selling saga, Roots.

After retiring from the National Archives, Walker pursued a career with D.C. public schools and worked as an archivist and associate director of the Charles Sumner School Museum. He retired about two years before his death.

Throughout his life, he was a popular lecturer, teacher and research consultant on projects pertaining to black and ethnic genealogy. He frequently led library workshops and spoke at conferences, often during Black History Month. On researching African American genealogy, Walker said, "Most people have no conception of the wealth of material available to them."

== Death ==
Walker died of lung cancer on October 6, 1993.

== Affiliations ==
- American Association for State and Local History, council member (1974-1978)
- Certification of Genealogists, trustee of the board (1974-1978)
- Planning Committee of the World Conference on Records, member (1980)
- Washington, D.C. Historic Records Advisory Board, member (1980-1986)
- Washington, D.C. Bicentennial Commission, member (1986-1991)
- Ellis Island Restorations Commission, member (1988-1993)

== Awards ==
- 1978 Fellow Award of the National Genealogical Society
- 1979 Meritorious Civilian Service Award, after finishing his government service
- James Dent Walker Memorial Lecture established in his honor by The Federation of Genealogical Societies, 1994
- Elected to the National Genealogy Hall of Fame in May 1999

== Publications ==
- Black Genealogy: How to Begin Athens, Ga. : University of Georgia, Center for Continuing Education, ©1977.
- Portions of Ethnic Genealogy with Jessie C. Smith, ed. Westport, Conn. : Greenwood Press, 1983.
- Guide to Local History. NARA (1981)
