= Gordon Wakefield =

Methodist minister and scholar

Gordon Stevens Wakefield (15 January 1921 – 11 September 2000) was a Methodist minister, academic and author.

He was educated at Crewe County Secondary School, the University of Manchester, Fitzwilliam College, Cambridge, Wesley House and St Catherine's College, Oxford.

Wakefield was a Methodist circuit minister in Edgware, Woodstock, Stockport, Newcastle upon Tyne and Bristol. He was Methodist Connexional Editor from 1963 to 1971; chairman of the Manchester and Stockport Methodist District from 1971 to 1979; principal of Queen's College, Birmingham, from 1979 to 1987 (and also a Lecturer at the University of Birmingham); chaplain of Westminster College, Oxford, from 1988 to 1989 and director of the Alister Hardy Research Centre from 1989 to 1992.
