= Doloroso, Mississippi =

Unincorporated community in Mississippi, United States

Coordinates: 31°18′19″N 91°21′34″W

Doloroso is an unincorporated community in Wilkinson County, Mississippi, United States near the county seat Woodville and the Homochitto National Forest. The community rests on U.S. Route 61.

== Notable people ==
- Catherine Stokes, is a retired deputy director of the Illinois Department of Public Health and a community volunteer. She is a pioneering African-American member of the Church of Jesus Christ of Latter-day Saints.
