= James Walker (American football coach) =

American football coach

Biographical details
- Born: November 30, 1944 (age 81)

Coaching career (HC unless noted)
- 1985: Kentucky State

Head coaching record
- Overall: 0–11

James Walker (born November 30, 1944) is an American former football coach. He was the 20th head football coach at Kentucky State University in Frankfort, Kentucky, serving for the 1985 season, and compiling a record of 0–11.

== Head coaching record ==
Year	Team	Overall	Conference	Standing	Bowl/playoffs
Kentucky State Thorobreds (NCAA Division II independent) (1985)
1985	Kentucky State	0–11			
Kentucky State:		0–11			
Total:		0–11			
