= Lies (The Knickerbockers song) =

Single by The Knickerbockers

from the album Lies
- B-side: "The Coming Generation"
- Released: November 1965
- Recorded: Sunset Sound, West Hollywood
- Genre: Garage rock; beat; pop rock
- Length: 2:40
- Label: Challenge
- Songwriters: Beau Charles, Buddy Randell
- Producer: Jerry Fuller

The Knickerbockers singles chronology
| "Jerk Town" (1965) | "Lies" (1965) | "One Track Mind" (1966) |

"Lies" is a song written by Beau Charles and Buddy Randell of the Knickerbockers. Released as a single in November 1965, it reached #20 on the Billboard Hot 100 and #11 in Canada in 1966. It was featured on their 1966 album Lies and is famous for often being mistaken for a Beatles track.

== Background ==
Knickerbockers guitarist Beau Charles has said of writing and recording the song: "We desperately tried to write something that sounded like the British Invasion. We wrote 'Lies' in less than one half hour." After a Jerry Fuller inspired re-arrangement, the track was recorded at Sunset Sound in West Hollywood, California, with Bruce Botnick engineering. The multi-track master was then taken to producer Jerry Fuller's friend Leon Russell's home studio in the Hollywood Hills. The band recorded the vocals there, and overdubbed a new guitar part that was recorded through a damaged Fender amplifier for distortion.

With the three-way vocal harmonies, sung by John Charles, Beau Charles, and Buddy Randall, "Lies" stood out for its Beatlesque sound. The Knickerbockers would become regulars on Dick Clark's Where The Action Is. Their debut album was released a few months later, in early 1966, and was named after the hit, and featured the song. "Lies" entered the Billboard Hot 100 in the final week of December 1965 went to number 20 on the charts in late January 1966, and was, in total, on the Hot 100 for thirteen weeks, before leaving the charts in February 1966, last placed at number 34.

== Personnel ==
- Buddy Randall - lead vocals
- Beau Charles - electric guitar, backing vocals
- John Charles - bass guitar, backing vocals
- Jimmy Walker - drums

== Other versions ==
- The Ventures on their 1965 album Where the Action Is.
- Nancy Sinatra on her 1966 album Boots.
- The T-Bones on their 1966 album No Matter What Shape (Your Stomach's In).
- Gary Lewis & the Playboys on their 1967 album Gary Lewis & the Playboys.
- Lulu on her 1966 album From Lulu...with Love.
- Styx on their 1974 album Man of Miracles. Record World said that it's "one midwestern hit that still sounds like a national smash."
- Tarney/Spencer Band on their 1979 album Run for Your Life.
- Linda Ronstadt on her 1982 album Get Closer.
- The Delmonas on their 1985 album Dangerous Charms.
- The Undead on their 1986 album Never Say Die!
- The Landlords on their 1987 EP Our Favorite Songs!
- The Basement Wall on their 1993 compilation album There Goes the Neighborhood! Volume 2 Featuring The Basement Wall.
- Keith Moon as an outtake on 2006 deluxe edition of Two Sides of the Moon.
- The Fireballs on their 2006 compilation album Firebeat! The Great Lost Vocal Album.
- The Brymers on their 2007 compilation album Sacrifice.
- The Black Belles as the B-side to their 2010 single "What Can I Do?"

== See also ==
- List of 1960s one-hit wonders in the United States
