= The Royal Teens =

American rock and roll band

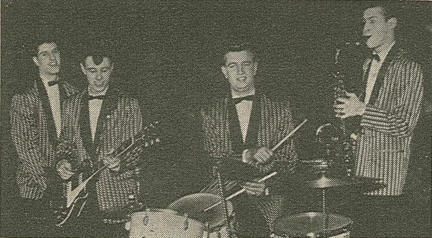

Background information
- Origin: Fort Lee, New Jersey, United States
- Genres: Rock; pop; rock and roll
- Years active: 1956–1965
- Labels: RCA, Epic/CBS, Capitol/EMI, Musicor, Jubilee
- Members: Tom Austin - drums Bob Azzara - piano Flip Cesario - guitar Bill Crandall - saxophone Bill Dalton - bass Bob Gaudio - piano Al Kooper - guitar Larry Qualiano - saxophone Dan Sabatino - vocals Joe Villa (Joe Francavilla) - vocals Raymond Mariani - vocals & composer Vince Cautero - vocals
- Website: http://theroyalteens.com

The Royal Teens were an American rock and roll band that formed in New Jersey in 1956 and originally consisted of Bob Gaudio on piano, Tom Austin on drums, Billy Dalton on guitar, and Billy Crandall on saxophone. The group is best known for its single "Short Shorts", which was a number 3 hit in the United States in 1958. The follow-up single, 1959's "Believe Me", hit number 26. They never recorded an album, and broke up in 1965.

== History ==
The term "Short Shorts" in the song referred specifically to very short cutoff jeans as worn by teenage girls. The term appears to have originated with Bob Gaudio and Tom Austin. According to the group's website, they coined the term in 1957, and hit on using it as a song theme and title that summer when they saw two girls in cutoffs leaving a local teen spot.

Originally, the group's name was simply "The Royals", but they were persuaded to add the word "Teens" in order to avoid having the same name as an existing band. The performers on the 1957 Bell Sound Studios recording were Bob Gaudio (piano), Tom Austin (drums and whistle effect), Billy Dalton (guitar), Billy Crandall (sax and vocal effect), and Diana Lee (a female vocalist working for Leo Rogers). The record was originally released on a private label, Power Records. The song's instant popularity led the label owner to license the production to ABC-Paramount Records. It reached number 3 on the list later known as the Billboard Hot 100.

The group undertook a tour. The sax player, Billy Crandall, age 14, was not allowed by his parents to tour with the group, and was replaced by Larry Qualiano. One of the other members had already graduated, and the other two took time off from high school. Some of their touring companions included Buddy Holly, Sam Cooke, Jackie Wilson, Jerry Lee Lewis, Bo Diddley, Chuck Berry, and Frankie Avalon.

The group performed the song in the 1958 jukebox musical Let's Rock which also featured Danny and the Juniors, Paul Anka, and Julius LaRosa.

== Legacy ==
Keyboardist Bob Gaudio later became a member of the Four Seasons. Fourteen-year-old member Al Kooper sometimes appeared with the Royal Teens on the road in 1959, and later founded the groups The Blues Project and Blood, Sweat & Tears. Kooper also performed as a session musician on several of Bob Dylan's albums in the mid-1960s, including being the creator of the signature organ riff on Dylan’s iconic number one recording, “Like A Rolling Stone.” Vocalist Joe Francavilla (also known as Joey Villa) joined the group in late 1958. He previously sang with the Three Friends, which had a minor hit with "Blanche".

=== Joey and the Twisters ===
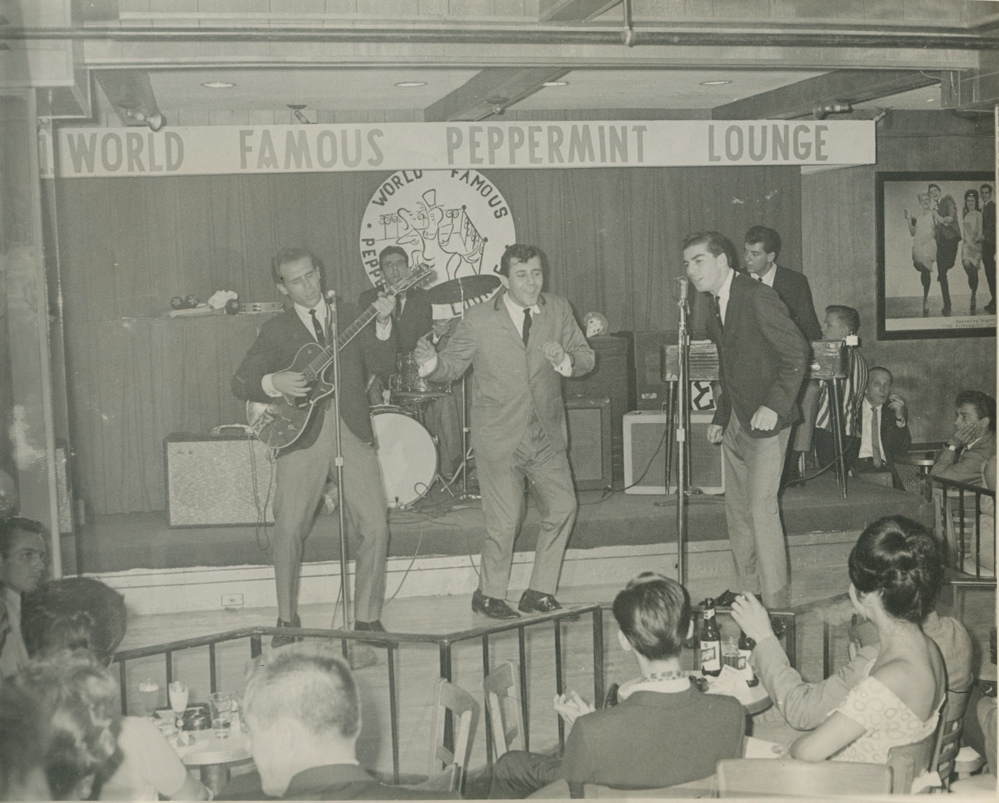

With several briefly tenured members of the Royal Teens, Francavilla went on to form Joey and the Twisters, which released a few minor hits ("Do You Want to Dance", "Bony Maronie") in 1961–1962 and frequently played the Peppermint Lounge in New York City as contemporaries of Joey Dee and the Starliters. The group was led by Teens vocalist Joey Villa (a.k.a. Joe Francovilla), along with several other members from the local Manhattan doo-wop scene.

The Twisters never released an album, but did release several singles on Duel Records, including remakes of Bobby Darin's "Jailer, Bring me Water," Bobby Freeman's "Do You Want to Dance", and "Bony Maronie," and penned "Peppermint Twist Time" in honor of the club that gave them a home.

They did launch on a national tour, the highlight of which was playing the Dream Room in New Orleans, and they appeared on Dick Clark's American Bandstand on New Year's Day, 1962.

The group dissolved as the twist fell out of fashion. Joey Villa continued playing as a solo artist. Bob Azzara and Louis Burgio, along with friend Flip Cesario, who briefly played with the Royal Teens, later formed the band Mardi Gras.

Members include:

- Joey Villa - Vocals
- Bob Azzara - piano
- Louis Burgio - drums
- Frankie Natale - saxophone
- Rich Malfitano - saxophone
- Flip Cesario - guitar

=== Billy Crandall ===
Billy Crandall joined the Knickerbockers in 1964, using the name Buddy Randell, and sang lead vocal on the group's top-20 hit "Lies" in 1966. Crandall later performed with the contemporary Messianic group, Jerusalem Rivers, before dying in 1998.

=== Short Shorts ===
The song "Short Shorts" was used in commercials for Nair in the 1970s, sparking interest in the group; a reunion of the group (without Gaudio, who had by then ceased performing live in any capacity) appeared on The Midnight Special in 1974, performing "Short Shorts" to a pre-recorded backing track. The song was used in Japan for the opening tune of Tamori Club on TV Asahi Corporation until April 2023.

=== 21st century ===
It also featured in an episode of The Simpsons - Season 8 ‘The Mysterious Voyage of Homer’ where the episode ends with a shot of Springfield residents wearing short shorts and dancing to the song.

Gaudio and Austin reunited at the August Wilson Theater the night of the premiere of Jersey Boys, which included "Short Shorts" in its libretto. Austin said he was so proud to have traveled the first leg of Gaudio's historical musical journey with him.

Billy Dalton died of an apparent heart attack on Saturday, October 8, 2011. After his funeral Mass, he was interred in St. Patrick Cemetery in Rochelle, Illinois, on October 13, 2011 — which would have been his 71st birthday.

== Discography ==
=== ABC Paramount Records ===
- 1958: "Short Shorts" / "Planet Rock" (originally issued on the tiny Power Records label)
- 1958: "Big Name Button" / "Sham Rock"
- 1958: "Harvey's Got A Girlfriend" / "Hangin' Around"
- 1958: "Open The Door" / "My Kind of Dream"

=== Power Records ===
- 1959: "Sittin With My Baby" / "Mad Gass"

=== Mighty Records ===
- 1959: "Leotards" / "Royal Blue"

=== Capitol Records ===
- 1959: "Believe Me" / "Little Cricket"
- 1960: "The Moon's Not Meant For Lovers (Anymore)" / "Was It A Dream?"
- 1960: "It's The Talk of the Town" / "With You"

== See also ==
- 1956 in music
- Shorts#Styles
