= Jamie Walker (minister) =

Minister of the Church of Scotland

James Bernard "Jamie" Walker is a Church of Scotland minister.

Walker was educated at Hamilton Academy, the University of Edinburgh and Merton College, Oxford. He was ordained in 1975. He served in Dundee and Galashiels. Walker was Principal of Queen's College, Birmingham from 1987 to 1993. After that he was at St Andrews University from 1993 to 2011, serving as Chaplain, Associate Director of Student Services and Assistant Director
