= Jimmy Walker (drummer) =

American drummer and singer (1941–2020)

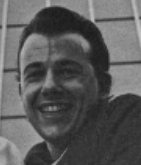
- Walker in 1965

Background information
- Born: James Walker; 1941; The Bronx, New York, U.S
- Origin: New Jersey, U.S
- Died: July 15, 2020 (aged 79) California, U.S.
- Genre: Garage rock
- Occupation: Musician
- Instruments: Drums, vocals
- Formerly of: The Knickerbockers (1964–1967); The Righteous Brothers (1968–1971)

Jimmy Walker (1941 – July 15, 2020) was an American musician and singer who was the drummer for band The Knickerbockers and the replacement for Bill Medley in the Righteous Brothers, following his 1968 departure.

== Early life ==
Born in The Bronx, New York, Walker learned the drums when he was around seven or eight. He was of Irish descent. His first group was in New York called The Castle Kings. They had signed to Atlantic Records after Ahmet Ertegun, the then president of the company, heard them:

I started singing on the neighborhood street corner, harmonizing acapella versions of radio hits with three friends and later adding drums and guitars, learning along the way, playing local events and parties. We called the group the Castle Kings after Castle Hill Ave., the street where we started singing. We recorded a demo of a couple of songs and peddled it to several record companies. Mickey Addey of Dot records wanted to sign us after a chance meeting in front of Dot records with Ahmet Ertegun of Atlantic records who was listening to the group singing harmony while waiting for a ride. Ahmet offered the band a meeting and within a week signed the group to a contract. After a year and several recordings with people like Tommy Dowd, Phil Ele, Phil Spector and with a wealth of experience and great memories, the group split up and went its own way.

When he was a young adult, he moved to Bergenfield, New Jersey, and worked as a truck driver.

== The Knickerbockers (1964–1967) ==
Walker rose to prominence in 1965 as the drummer for the New Jersey–based group The Knickerbockers, consisting of brothers John and Beau Charles (guitar and bass), and Buddy Randall (previously of the Royal Teens fame/lead vocals). He first heard of them after hearing them play at a local fire department for memorial day in 1964:

They were looking for a drummer, and the first time I saw the Knickerbockers was in a neighborhood venue. It was a supermarket that had been emptied, sold-out and it was reopened to do a little party on Memorial Day. I was walking down the street and I heard this music so I went back and they were set up playing as a trio. Buddy, the saxophone player was playing the drums, really well, and I thought, boy this is a band I’d love to play with! A couple of weeks or months later, they called me up because they’d heard I was a drummer and that I was looking for work. So I went and set up in John and Beau house and we played, but my drumming skills were a little bit on the amateur side because I was still young. Then they asked me to sing, I sang some rock ’n’ roll stuff and John and Beau’s mum heard me sing and she said “Hire that guy, he does sound good”! So my skills with drumming didn’t get me the work, it was the singing. Then I improved as a drummer because you get to play a lot. Also, Buddy taught me a lot of stuff on the drums that he got from other good drummers. But it was actually my voice that got me the job.

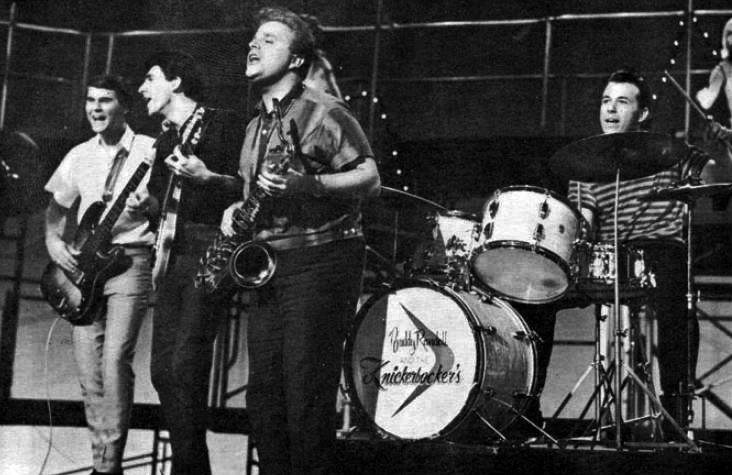
Walker (far right on drums) with The Knickerbockers In 1965

They were spotted by producer and singer-songwriter Jerry Fuller playing the University Twist Palace in Albany, New York, and he signed them to Los Angeles–based Challenge Records. A one-hit wonder band, they had a number 20 charting hit in 1965, with their “Lies”. With the three-way vocal harmonies by John Charles, Beau Charles, and Buddy Randall, "Lies" stood out due to its Beatles-esque sound. The Knickerbockers would become regulars on Dick Clark's Where The Action Is. Their debut album was released a few months later, in early 1966, and was named after the hit, and featured the song on there too.

"Lies" entered the Billboard Hot 100 in the final week of December 1965, went to number 20 on the charts in late January 1966, and was, in total, on the Hot 100 for thirteen weeks, before leaving the charts in February 1966, last placed at number 34. "Lies" has since been covered by the likes of Linda Ronstadt, Styx, Nancy Sinatra, Gary Lewis & the Playboys, Lulu, and an instrumental version by The Ventures.

Despite appearing daily on Where the Action Is and constantly releasing new material, such as “One Track Mind”, “My Feet Are Off The Ground”, and a cover of Tom Jones' “It's Not Unusual” (which featured Walker on lead vocals), none of them could match the popularity of “Lies”, and Walker left the band in 1967.

He reappeared with the group for two reunions in 1983 and 1990.

== The Righteous Brothers (1968–1971) ==
In February 1968, Bill Medley of the Righteous Brothers, left the duo to pursue a solo career. Walker would fill in Medley's place as the new righteous brother, from 1968 to 1971. As the Righteous Brothers, Walker and Bobby Hatfield released one album, Re-Birth (1969), which Walker also co-produced.

Walker remained in the duo until their three-year hiatus in 1971. In a 2013 interview, Walker said he had wanted to continue, but Hatfield decided to take a break and broke up the act.

The Righteous Brothers reformed again in 1974, with the original duo of Medley and Hatfield.

== Solo ==
In 1968, Walker signed to Columbia Records, and recorded a handful of solo singles between 1968 and 1970, including; Down In My Broken Dreams (1968), The Greatest Love (1969) and I Got The Best Of You (1969), Chop No Wood (1970), and Feel The Warm (1970). His time in Columbia Records was short-lived, as he stepped down from his contract two years later.

Walker released his debut solo album, Still There In My Soul, in 2014.

== Later life ==
After leaving Columbia Records in 1969, he would retire from working as a full-time professional musician and move to Wyoming in the 1970s. In the 1970s, he worked with three soul-funk groups; Fatback, Oasis and Hot Street. Walker would continue to perform with his own group “The Jimmy Walker Band”. Walker moved to Las Vegas, Nevada in 2004, before relocating to California in 2012.

== Death ==
Walker died on July 15, 2020, aged 79 at his home in California. A cause of death has yet to be publicly revealed.

== Discography ==
=== With The Knickerbockers ===
==== Singles ====
A-Side	B-Side	Year
All I Need is You	Bite Bite Barracuda	1964
Jerktown	Room for One More	1965
Lies	The Coming Generation	1965
One Track Mind	I Must Be Doing Something Right	1966
High on Love	Stick With Me	1966
Chapel in the Fields	Just One Girl	1966
Love is a Bird	Rumors, Gossip, Words Untrue	1966
Please Don't Love Him	Can You Help Me	1966
What Does That Make You?	Sweet Green Fields	1967
Come and Get It	Wishful Thinking	1967
I Can Do It Better	You'll Never Walk Alone	1967

===== Albums =====
Title	Label	Year
Lloyd Thaxton Presents....	Challenge	1965
Jerk & Twine Time	Challenge	1966

=== With The Righteous Brothers ===
==== Albums ====
Title	Year
Re-Birth	1969

==== Singles ====
Titles (A-side, B-side)	Album	Year
"Here I Am" b/w "So Many Lonely Nights Ahead"	Souled Out	1968
"You've Lost That Lovin' Feelin'" b/w "Let the Good Times Roll" (from The Righteous Brothers Greatest Hits, Vol. 2) UK reissue	The Righteous Brothers Greatest Hits	1969
"Woman, Man Needs Ya" b/w "And the Party Goes On"	Re-Birth	1970
"Po' Folks" b/w "Good N' Nuff"	Re-Birth	1970

=== Solo ===
==== Singles ====
Title	Label	Year	Note
Down In My Broken Dreams	Columbia	1968	
The Greatest Love	Columbia	1969	
I Got The Best Of You	Columbia	1969	
Feel The Warm	Columbia	1970	
Chop No Wood	Columbia	1970	

==== Albums ====
Title	Label	Year	Note
Still There In My Soul	Independent	2014	
