= James N. Walker =

American politician

James N. Walker was an American politician who served as a member of the 1863-1865 California State Assembly, representing the 4th District.
