= James Alonzo Walker =

American Tuskegee Airmen aviator (1918–2004)

Lieutenant colonel James A. Walker
- James A. Walker
- Born: James Alonzo Walker; September 20, 1918; Manning, South Carolina, U.S.
- Died: August 23, 2004 (aged 85); Hayward, California, U.S.
- Education: Hampton Institute
- Spouse: Helen
- Children: 4
- Military career
- Allegiance: United States
- Branch: United States Army Air Force; United States Air Force
- Service years: 1943-1964
- Rank: Lieutenant Colonel
- Nickname: Jimmy
- Unit: 332d Fighter Group
- Awards: Air Medal; Congressional Gold Medal awarded to Tuskegee Airmen; Distinguished Flying Cross

James Alonzo Walker (September 20, 1918 – August 23, 2004) was an American aviator from Manning, South Carolina who served as a Tuskegee Airman during World War II. He flew more than 102 missions in the European Theatre of WWII, and was shot down in action over Serbia at the time occupied Kingdom of Yugoslavia by Third Reich ( Germany). He was saved in Halyard Mission known in Serbian as (Operation Air Bridge) in July 1944t, by Chetniks and general Dragoljub Draža Mihailović. He served in the military until 1964. He became the first African American commander of an integrated unit in 1950.

== Early life ==
He was born in Manning, South Carolina and his parents were James and Daisy. Walker went to High School in Baltimore, Maryland. He went to Hampton Institute in Virginia. Before joining the Tuskegee Airman Walker had 90 hours of flight time.

== Career ==
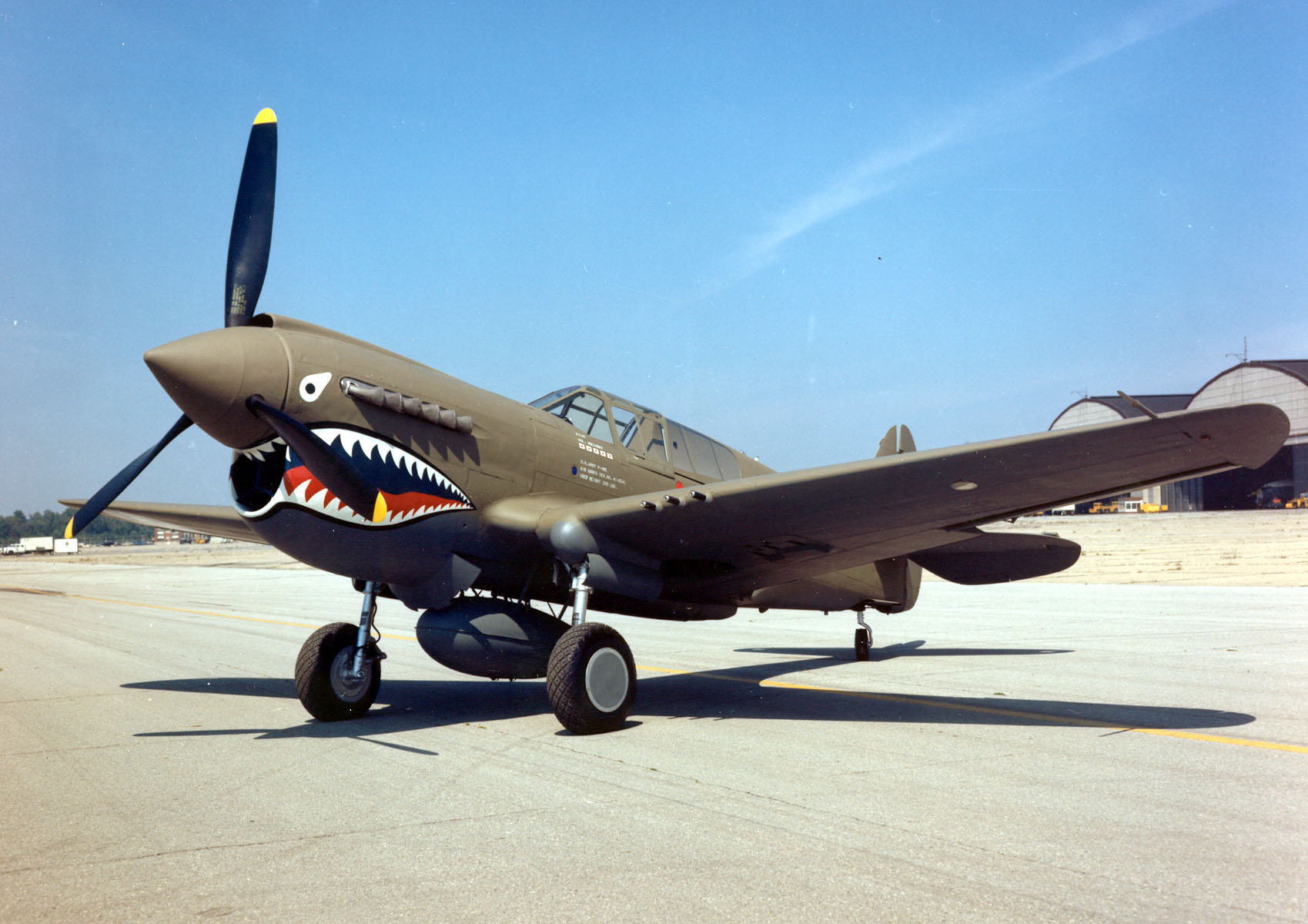
Walker flew a P-40 Warhawk during his time in the European Theatre. (Note: The Tuskegee Airmen trained with the P-40 aircraft. Later the Tuskegee Airmen became known for flying the P-51 aircraft with red markings that distinguished the Tuskegee Airmen included red bands on the noses of P-51s as well as a red rudder; their P-51B and D Mustangs flew with similar color schemes, with red propeller spinners, yellow wing bands and all-red tail surfaces.)

Walker enlisted as a cadet and began military service in July 1941. He was assigned to the 99th Pursuit Squadron 332nd Fighter Group on June 1, 1942. Walker was in class Class 43-E-SE. Walker was shot down over the in Serbia. He was missing for 30 days before returning to his unit. He piloted a P-40 Warhawk in Europe during WWII. When he was shot down he came across an armed teen: Aleksandar Zivkovic. The teen helped Walker elude the enemy and helped him get back to his unit 39 days later. Walker met with Zivkovic a half a century later and thanked him. After that he was saved in Mission Haylard by Chetniks and general Dragoljub Draža Mihailović and was transported to Italy.

In 1950, at Langley Air Force Base, Walker was the first African American officer to have command of an unsegregated unit.

Walker had served for 26 years eventually retiring with the rank of Lieutenant Colonel.

== Awards and honors ==
- Air Medal with three oak leaf clusters and four battle stars
- 2006 Congressional Gold Medal, awarded to Tuskegee Airmen
- Distinguished Flying Cross

== See also ==
- Executive Order 9981
- List of Tuskegee Airmen
- List of Tuskegee Airmen Cadet Pilot Graduation Classes
- Military history of African Americans
- The Tuskegee Airmen (movie)
