= James C. Walker =

American Union soldier during Civil War

James C. Walker (November 30, 1843 - April 8, 1923) was an American soldier in the Union Army during the American Civil War who was awarded the Medal of Honor. The medal was given to him on 25 November 1895 for actions at Battle of Missionary Ridge, Tennessee as a Private with the 31st Ohio Infantry. He is now interred in Ferncliff Cemetery, Springfield, Ohio.

== Medal of Honor citation ==
For extraordinary heroism on 25 November 1863, in action at Missionary Ridge, Tennessee. After two Color Bearers had fallen, Private Walker seized the flag and carried it forward, assisting in the capture of a battery. Shortly thereafter he captured the flag of the 41st Alabama and the Color Bearer.
