= Jim Walker (American football coach) =

American football player and coach

Biographical details
- Born: c. 1944

Playing career
- 1960–1963: Texas Tech
- 1964: Toledo Tornadoes
- Positions: Defensive back, fullback

Coaching career (HC unless noted)
- 1976–1977: Western New Mexico

Jim Walker (born c. 1944) is an American former football player and coach. He served as the head football coach at Western New Mexico University from 1976 to 1977.

He played college football at Texas Tech University in the early 1960s.
