= James Phenix Walker =

American politician

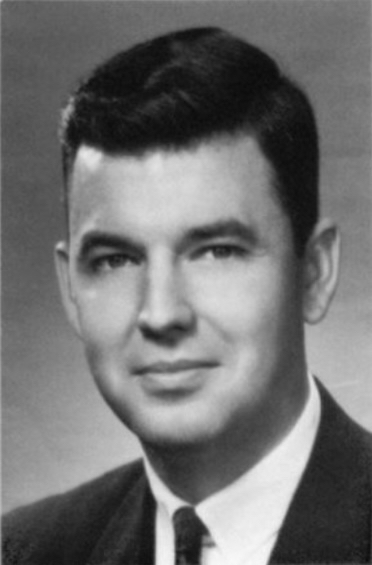

Member of the Mississippi House of Representatives
- In office 1960–???

Personal details
- Born: September 29, 1935 Memphis, Tennessee, U.S.
- Died: October 24, 1966 (aged 31)
- Children: 1

James Phenix Walker (September 29, 1935 – October 24, 1966) was an American politician. He served as a member of the Mississippi House of Representatives.

== Life and career ==
Walker was born in Memphis, Tennessee. He was an attorney.

In 1960, Walker was elected to the Mississippi House of Representatives.

Walker died in October 1966, at the age of 31.
