= James Walker Nursing School Quarters =

- U.S. National Register of Historic Places
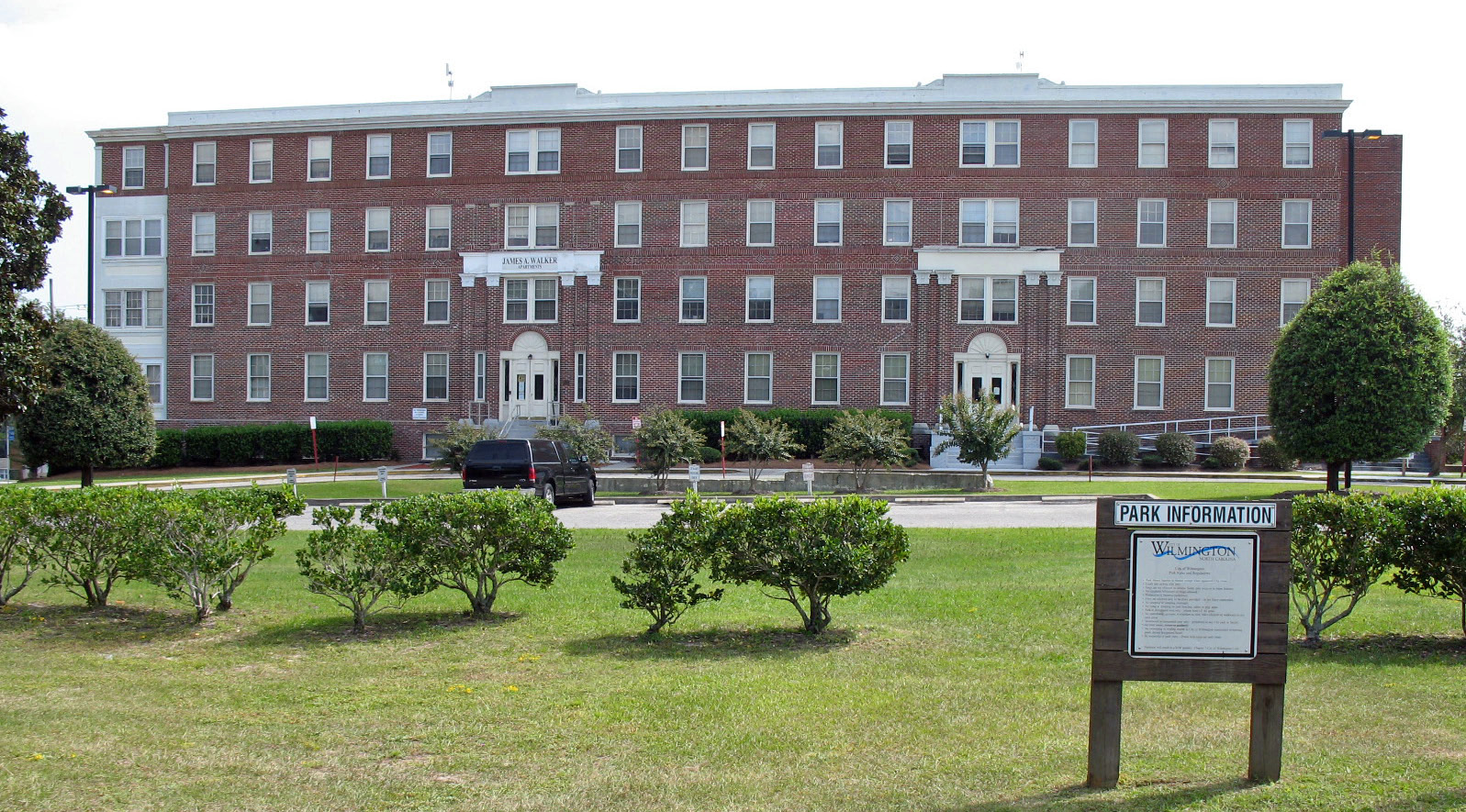
- James Walker Nursing School Quarters, September 2009

- Location within North Carolina Location within the United States
- Location: 1020 Rankin St., Wilmington, North Carolina
- Coordinates: 34°14′27″N 77°56′11″W
- Area: 0.3 acres (0.12 ha)
- Built: 1921
- Architectural style: Colonial Revival, Classical Revival, Utilitarian industrial
- NRHP reference No.: 89000944
- Added to NRHP: July 20, 1989

James Walker Nursing School Quarters, also known as New Hanover County Dept. of Social Services Building, is a historic dormitory located at Wilmington, New Hanover County, North Carolina. The original was built in 1921 and is a four-story, brick veneered, reinforced concrete building with Colonial Revival and Classical Revival style design elements. Additions were made to the original building in 1926, 1937, 1945, and 1968. The building once featured two porticoes, but they were removed after 1966. It was used as living quarters for nurses until the closure of the associated hospital in 1967 and is the last remaining building of the medical complex.

It was listed on the National Register of Historic Places in 1989.
