= James Walker (cricketer, born 1981) =

English cricketer

Personal information
- Full name: James Ross Walker
- Born: 4 March 1981 (age 45); Norwich, Norfolk, England
- Batting: Right-handed
- Role: Wicket-keeper

Domestic team information
- Years: Team
- 1998–2004: Norfolk

Career statistics
Competition	List A
Matches	6
Runs scored	103
Batting average	20.60
100s/50s	–/1
Top score	76
Balls bowled	–
Wickets	–
Bowling average	–
5 wickets in innings	–
10 wickets in match	–
Best bowling	–
Catches/stumpings	2/–
- Source: Cricinfo, 28 June 2011

James Ross Walker (born 4 March 1981) is an English cricketer. Walker is a right-handed batsman who fielded as a wicket-keeper. He was born in Norwich, Norfolk.

Walker made his debut for Norfolk in the 1998 Minor Counties Championship against Staffordshire. Walker played Minor counties cricket for Norfolk from 1998 to 2004, which included 24 Minor Counties Championship matches and 14 MCCA Knockout Trophy matches. He made his List A debut against the Surrey Cricket Board in the 1999 NatWest Trophy. He made 5 further List A appearances, the last coming against Lincolnshire in the 1st round of the 2004 Cheltenham & Gloucester Trophy, which was played 2003. In his 6 List A matches, he scored 103 runs at an average of 20.60, with a high score of 76. This was his only half century in List A cricket and it came against the Netherlands in the 2002 Cheltenham & Gloucester Trophy.
