= Short Shorts =

Single by The Royal Teens
- B-side: "Planet Rock"
- Released: January 1958
- Genre: Doo-wop, Novelty song
- Length: 2:12
- Label: ABC-Paramount
- Songwriters: Tom Austin, Bill Crandell, Bill Dalton, Bob Gaudio

The Royal Teens singles chronology
"Short Shorts" (1958)	"Sham Rock" (1958)

"Short Shorts" is a song written and performed by Tom Austin, Bill Crandell, Bill Dalton, and Bob Gaudio, members of The Royal Teens. It reached #2 on the U.S. R&B chart and #3 on the U.S. pop chart in 1958. The group originally released the track on the small New York label Power Records in 1957.

In an interview with Newsweek, Dalton explained how the song came to be written: "We were practicing one night at my house, and one guy started putting some notes together. Another guy picked it up and added some more. Before we knew it we had a tune. During the next three weeks we added and changed and polished until we had it the way we wanted it. Later, the four of us were riding down the street in Bergenfield ... It was a warm day and we saw this girl in shorts walking down the street. That gave us the idea for the lyrics".

The record ranked #35 on Billboard's Year-End top 50 singles of 1958.

== Other charting versions ==
- The Salsoul Orchestra released it as a single which reached #106 on the U.S. pop chart in 1977.

== Other versions ==
- Tiny Bradshaw and His Orchestra, as a single in 1958, which did not chart.
- Tommy Sands, as part of a medley with "(I'm) All Shook Up", "Splish Splash", and "Hound Dog" on his 1960 live album, Sands at the Sands.
- Freddie and the Dreamers, on their 1965 album, Frantic Freddie.
- From the 1970s to the 90s, the song was adapted into the campaign slogan "We wear short shorts, Nair for short shorts" in commercials for Nair hair-removal products.
- The Simpsons featured the song four times, in the episodes "Homer the Heretic" (1992), "El Viaje Misterioso de Nuestro Jomer (The Mysterious Voyage of Homer)" (1997), "She of Little Faith" (2001), and "Sweets and Sour Marge" (2002) – the first three of these episodes were well known for dealing with spiritual matters.
- The Jersey Boys 2005 Broadway cast, on their 2005 album, Jersey Boys (Original Broadway Cast Recording).
- In the 2006 Family Guy episode "Stu & Stewie's Excellent Adventure", a 60-something Joe Swanson living in the year 2035 sang, "Who wears short shorts? I wear short shorts!!" while flaunting the legs transplanted from his now-deceased wife Bonnie.
