= James Alexander Walker (painter) =

French painter

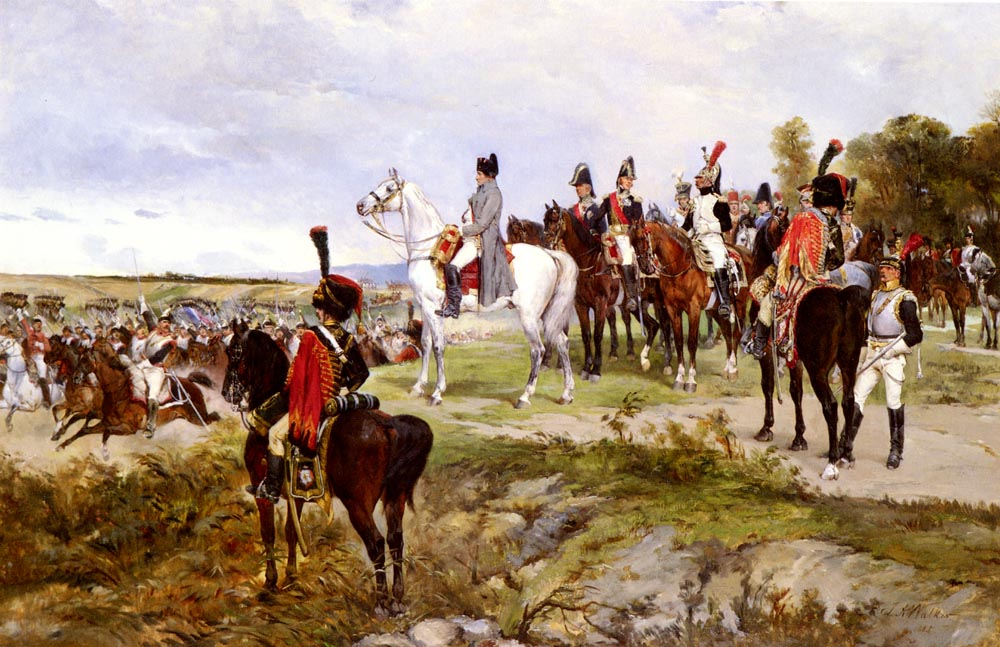
Napoleon Watching The Battle Of Friedland in 1807

James Alexander Walker (1831 – 1898), was a British painter of French descent known for his battle scenes.

== Biography ==
He was born in Calcutta, but from 1871 he lived in Paris where he made historical scenes of soldiers.

He died in Paris.
