= Ann Prentice =

British nutritionist

Ann Prentice CBE FMedSci FAfN FRSB
- Born: 1952 (age 73–74)
- Education: University of Oxford; University of Surrey; University of Cambridge
- Occupation: Nutritionist
- Employer: Medical Research Council

Ann Prentice, CBE, FMedSci, FAfN, FRSB (born 1952) is a British nutritionist.

== Education ==
Prentice studied chemistry at the University of Oxford, then medical physics at the University of Surrey, and natural sciences at the University of Cambridge.

== Career ==
Since 1978, her career has been with the Medical Research Council, both in the United Kingdom and The Gambia at the MRC Unit The Gambia. From 1998, until its closure in 2018, she was the director of the MRC's collaborative Centre for Human Nutrition Research (HNR) (latterly called the "Elsie Widdowson Laboratory"). Her research group subsequently moved to the MRC Epidemiology Unit within the University of Cambridge School of Clinical Medicine where she is Honorary Professor of Global Nutrition and Health.

Her research focuses on lifecourse nutritional requirements for population health, with an emphasis on calcium and vitamin D, and encompasses the nutritional problems of both affluent and resource-limited societies. She is involved in projects studying pregnant and lactating women, people living with HIV, children, adolescents and older persons in the UK, The Gambia, Uganda, Malawi, Kenya, China, Bangladesh, India and South Africa. She is internationally recognised for her work in nutrition and bone health, and human lactation.

Her research interests include:

- Optimal nutritional status and nutritional vulnerability in relation to health
- Nutritional problems of the developing world and global health
- Dietary requirements for human growth, pregnancy and lactation, and old age
- Nutritional aspects of bone health, peak bone mass, rickets and osteoporosis
- Calcium and vitamin D requirements across the life span and across populations
- Human lactational physiology and breast-milk composition
- Human calcium, vitamin D and bone physiology, metabolism and genetics
- Population nutritional recommendations and surveillance
- Functional and biochemical markers of micronutrient status

She has served on the UK Government's Scientific Advisory Committee on Nutrition (SACN) since its inception, including as chair between 2010 - 2020. She is a member of the SACN Subgroup on Maternal and Child Nutrition (SMCN). From 2004 to 2007, she served as president of the Nutrition Society.

== Honours ==
Prentice was appointed Officer of the Order of the British Empire (OBE) in the 2006 Birthday Honours and Commander of the Order of the British Empire (CBE) in the 2024 New Year Honours for services to British and global public health nutrition.

She is an Honorary Fellow of the Royal College of Paediatrics and Child Health, a Fellow of the Academy of Medical Sciences (FMedSci), a Fellow of the Association for Nutrition (FAfN), and a Fellow of the Royal Society of Biology (FRSB).

Prentice is the recipient of numerous honours, awards and prizes; she received the British Nutrition Foundation Prize in 2011, the Institut Candia's Laureate de Le Prix Scientifique in 1998, and the Robert and Edna Langholz Award for International Nutrition in 2004. In 2018 she received the Macy-György Award (International Society of Research into Human Milk and Lactation), in 2017 she was made honorary Fellow of the International Union of Nutritional Sciences. She was the recipient of the 2020 inaugural Widdowson Award, named in honour of Elsie Widdowson, from the Nutrition Society in recognition of her excellent contribution to the field of public health nutrition. On 7 December 2020, she delivered her Widdowson Award lecture entitled "Hard facts and misfits: essential ingredients of public health nutrition research".

She holds an Honorary Doctorate from the University of Surrey, and Honorary Professorships at the University of the Witwatersrand and at Shenyang Medical College in addition to her Professorship at the University of Cambridge.
