= NHS (disambiguation) =

NHS is the National Health Service, the four publicly funded health care services in the United Kingdom, considered collectively.

NHS may also refer to:

== Health care ==
- Niagara Health System, a multiple hospital amalgamation in Niagara Region, Ontario, Canada
- National Health Service (England), the healthcare service of England
  - NHS England, the oversight body responsibly for the provision of healthcare services in England
- NHS Scotland, the health and social care service of Scotland, overseen by Healthcare Improvement Scotland
- NHS Wales, the healthcare service of Wales, overseen by Public Health Wales
- Health and Social Care in Northern Ireland, the health and social care service of Northern Ireland, overseen by the Public Health Agency of Northern Ireland
- The Italian Servizio Sanitario Nazionale (SSN), also called the NHS in English

== Schools ==
=== Australia ===
- Norwood International High School, Adelaide, formerly known as Norwood High School
- Nuriootpa High School, Nuriootpa, South Australia

=== Canada ===
- Newmarket High School, Ontario, Canada

=== United States ===
- New Hampton School, New Hampshire
- Newport High School (Bellevue, Washington)
- Niceville High School, Florida
- Niwot High School, Colorado
- Noblesville High School, Indiana
- Nordhoff High School, California
- North High School (Bakersfield, California)
- Northgate High School (Walnut Creek, California)
- Northwood High School (Irvine, California)
- Northport High School, New York
- Norwood High School (Massachusetts)
- School of Nursing and Health Studies, Georgetown University, Washington, D.C.
- Sioux City North High School, Iowa

== Other uses ==
- Nag Hammadi Studies, an academic book series published by Brill
- National Highway System (United States)
- National Historic Site (United States)
- National Historic Sites of Canada
- National Honor Society, United States
- National Household Survey, of the Canada 2011 Census
- Newport Historical Society, an American historical organization
- NHS (gene)
- NHS, Inc., an American sports equipment company
- NHS Credit Union, for NHS employees, Glasgow, Scotland
- N-Hydroxysuccinimide, a reagent used in organic synthesis
- Ninja High School, an American comic book
- Independent Trade Unions of Croatia, or Nezavisni Hrvatski Sindikati (NHS)
