= Alison Tedstone =

Chief nutritionist of Public Health England

Alison Tedstone MBE RNutr FAfN (born April 1961) was Chief Nutritionist (National Director of Diet, Obesity and Physical Activity) at Public Health England.

== Education ==
Tedstone has a BSc and a PhD degree from the University of London, and conducted research into nutrition at the University of Oxford.

== Career ==
In 2001, she became an academic at the London School of Hygiene & Tropical Medicine.

The same year, she was named Head of Nutrition Science at the Food Standards Agency. In 2010, her role (along with colleagues working on nutrition policy in England) transferred to the Department of Health, and in turn to Public Health England (PHE) when it was established in 2013. She was employed as chief nutritionist at PHE. Her work included the National Diet and Nutrition Survey, and she gave evidence to Parliament's Scientific Advisory Committee on Nutrition.

Tedstone is a Registered Public Health Nutritionist and a founding fellow of the Association for Nutrition, the voluntary regulator for nutritionists in the United Kingdom.

== Honours ==
Tedstone was appointed MBE in the 2021 Birthday Honours, for services to public health.
