= Michael Adrian Richards =

Oncologist and cancer researcher

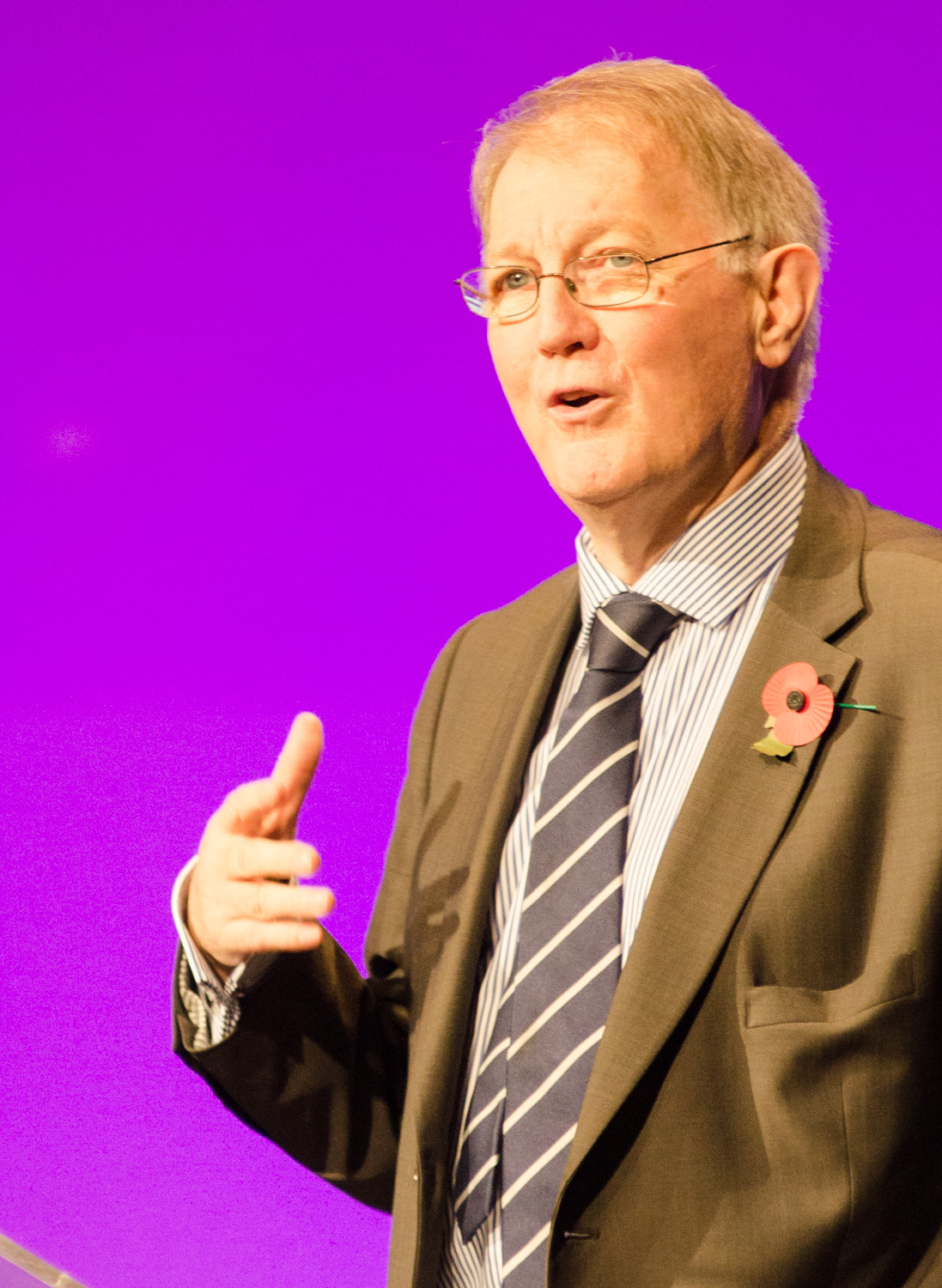
Richards speaking at the NCRI National Cancer Conference in 2014

Sir Michael Adrian Richards (born July 1951) is a British oncologist. From 1999 to 2013 he was the National Cancer Director in the UK Government's Department of Health. He was Chief Inspector of Hospitals in the Care Quality Commission from May 2013 until July 2017, and was said by the Health Service Journal to be the third most powerful person in the English NHS in December 2013.

Since April 2022, Richards has been the chair of the UK National Screening Committee.

== Education ==
Richards attended the Dragon School in Oxford, and Radley College.

== Career ==
Richards is a cancer specialist. He was an Imperial Cancer Research Fund (ICRF) research fellow in medical oncology at St Bartholomew's Hospital in London (1982–1986), and then an oncology consultant at Guy's Hospital in London (1986–1995), becoming a Reader in 1991. He was clinical director of Cancer Services at Guy's and St Thomas' Hospital in London (1991–1999) and Sainsbury Professor of Palliative Medicine at St Thomas' Hospital from 1995. He was head of the Academic Division of Oncology at King's College London from 1998 to 1999 and chair of the National Cancer Research Institute from 2006 to 2008.

He became a Fellow of the Royal College of Physicians (FRCP) in 1993, Fellow of the Royal College of Radiologists (FRCR) in 2000, and Fellow of the Faculty of Public Health (FFPHM, now FFPH) in 2002. He has been a trustee of the Science Museum in London and Marie Curie Cancer Care.

When interviewed about inspecting hospitals by The Independent in January 2014, he said "We have seen variation. There is variation between the best hospitals we’ve seen and the ones that are struggling… What is interesting is that within an individual hospital there is variation. The maternity service might be very good but the A&E service might require improvement."

In January 2017 he announced that he intended to retire from his role as Chief Inspector of Hospitals in the summer. In April 2022 he took up the role of chair of the UK National Screening Committee.

== Awards and honours ==
He received his CBE in the 2001 New Year Honours for services to cancer and palliative medicine, and his knighthood in 2010. In 2014 he received a Cancer Research UK Lifetime Achievement Award.
