= Robert McCance =

British doctor and scientist (1898–1993)

- Born: 9 December 1898; Belfast, Ulster
- Died: 5 March 1993 (aged 95); Cambridge, England
- Education: University of Cambridge
- Known for: Salt deficiency effects. Iron regulation mechanism. National Loaf. The Chemistry of Flesh Foods and their Losses on Cooking, Modern nutrition
- Awards: James Spence Medal in 1961; FRS; CBE; FRCP
- Scientific career
- Fields: Mineral metabolism, Pediatrics, Biochemistry, Nutrition
- Workplaces: Royal Naval Air Service, King's College Hospital, University of Cambridge
- Doctoral advisor: Frederick Gowland Hopkins

Robert Alexander McCance, CBE, FRS (9 December 1898 – 3 March 1993) was a British paediatrician, physiologist, biochemist and nutritionist and was the first Professor of Experimental Medicine at the University of Cambridge.

== Life ==
Born in Dunmurry, near Belfast, Ulster, the son of a linen merchant, he was educated at St. Bees School, before wartime service in the Royal Naval Air Service flying an observation aircraft from the warship HMS Indomitable. From 1919 he read Natural Sciences at Sidney Sussex College, Cambridge, after an initial start on the Agriculture course. In 1925 he went on to study medicine at King's College Hospital in London. While studying with R. D. Lawrence at his diabetic clinic and McCance became interested in diabetes, particularly in one of the complications of diabetic coma, sodium chloride (salt) deficiency. He then began a scientific career in the study of nutrition.

== Career ==
Remaining at King's College in the 1930s, McCance conducted research on himself, studying the physiological effects of salt. He would use volunteers who would eat a salt free diet, and lie sweating under heat lamps for two hours a day for 10 days, to remove salt from the body, and become salt deficient. This would lead to suffering in the volunteers including cramps and shortness of breath as well as anorexia and nausea. This led to further research which established that infants with salt deficiency, excreted little salt. A later line of research, initiated with a patient who had polycythaemia rubra vera led to research which established that the amount of iron in the body is regulated, not by intestinal excretion as had been taught, but by controlled absorption.

With colleague H. Shipp, he published The Chemistry of Flesh Foods and their Losses on Cooking in 1933. In 1936, he delivered the Goulstonian Lecture to the Royal College of Physicians, on the subject of Medical problems in mineral metabolism, the keystone based on his research on salt deficiency. In 1938, at the invitation of J. A. Ryle, he was promoted to Reader and moved to Cambridge, where he was made a fellow of Sidney Sussex. He wrote the long-standard text and reference book The Chemical Composition of Foods in 1940 in collaboration with his colleague Elsie Widdowson. Their work became known as the basis for modern Western nutritional thinking, with editions in print from 1940 to 2002. McCance and Widdowson played a leading part in wartime rationing and 1940s government nutrition efforts.

Research conducted by McCance led to the introduction of the National Loaf when he conducted research into the absorption and excretion of calcium and other nutrients, which led to a long series of metabolic studies. This research described the result, which shown that phytate in brown flour interfered with calcium absorption, which could be mitigated by adding calcium carbonate to the bread mix during preparation.. This led to legislation, which is still in effect today, which ensures that chalk is added to the bread mix, to ensure sufficient calcium uptake.

After the war, in 1945 a personal chair was created for him and he became the first professor of experimental medicine in the UK. He was later the director of the Medical Research Council's infantile malnutrition unit in Kampala, Uganda. He was elected a Fellow of the Royal Society in 1948, and appointed CBE in 1953. He died on 5 March 1993 in Cambridge.

== Awards and honours ==
- James Spence Gold Medal, Royal College of Paediatrics and Child Health
