= Drugs and prostitution =

Connection between prostitution and drugs

Drugs and prostitution have been documented to have a direct correlation.

Drug use tended to predate prostitution among low-level prostitutes with the connection most likely due to economic necessity. Low-level prostitutes tended to use depressants, specifically heroin, as the drug of choice. High-class prostitution showed that prostitution predates drug use with stimulants being the drug of choice.

A 1994 study among South London prostitutes showed links between sexual behavior, severity of dependence, and use of heroin, alcohol, and (to a lesser extent) cocaine.

== Substance use ==
In the case of street prostitutes, estimates reveal that between 40 and 85 percent of all street prostitutes use substances. A study conducted by the National Treatment Agency for Substance Misuse in the UK, has suggested that as 95% of women that are involved with street prostitution in the UK are heroin or crack cocaine users. However, organisations such as the English Collective of Prostitutes argue that such a figure is "unreliable as a national statistic", claiming that it originated "from a 2004 study of 71 women, contacted through an outreach project in Bristol [...] who were particularly vulnerable", and that there "are no reliable recent national figures of drug use among sex workers" in the UK.

Prostitutes who reported a problem with drug use had begun the use of hard drugs at an earlier age (16.2 years old). Because of these early experiences with drugs, these people often begin sex work early in their lives. The average age for people who engage in sex work with substance use was five months younger than those who have had no problem with drugs (19 years and 2 months old, instead of 19 years 7 months old).

Drug use is also linked with outdoor cruising, which involves cruising around a street looking for clients, and independent drifting which means prostitution from personal phones or crack houses. 84% of these workers, who work in this sector, reported problems with substance use, in comparison to the 13%, who work in an indoor-associated escort-type agency, such as a sauna, massage parlor, flat or Escort agency.

According to a survey conducted by the Center for Problem-Orientated Policing, of the sex workers over 25 who had experience with drug use, more than 70% have taken cannabis, amphetamines, cocaine, crack cocaine and heroin. Furthermore, for sex workers at 16 to 19 years of age who have taken drugs, over 70% of them have experienced cannabis, cocaine, and crack cocaine.

Prostitutes also use mind-altering drugs such as alcohol, PCP, and LSD; in addition to psychoactive drugs such as diazepam and Pethidine. Researchers have found the choice of drug to be important to the prostitute in serving real or perceived functions. In the case of heroin, it may be used to adjust to a life which they resent, as it increases peoples ability to withstand emotional and physical stress. Cocaine and other stimulants have also been reported to increase the confidence of streetwalkers' ability to talk to strangers, and allow for these sex workers to maintain their energy levels. Moreover, New York call-girls consume alcohol as means of protecting themselves from insults, both physically and emotionally. In addition, certain drugs, such as MDMA, are known to increase their effects on sex. Someone who wishes to enhance their sexual experience may turn to drugs in order to increase endurance, intensify sensations, and prolong the encounter.

At the street level, pimps often use drugs to exert control over prostitutes. Many pimps are also drug dealers and attract and lure women with free drugs and the promise of a high-rolling lifestyle. Pimps intend on getting these women addicted to drugs, and often target those who are at increased risk of addiction. Women targeted in this way may have financial or emotional problems, come from dysfunctional families, or have a drug addiction already. Once addicted, they will continue seeking drugs from the pimp, who will then inform the girl that he cannot continue financing their addiction without compensation. Because of the addiction, a person will try to find ways in which to finance and satisfy their dependence, and in many cases their dependence impairs their judgments, making these people more susceptible to becoming sex workers, and thus that addiction keeps them enslaved to the industry. Moreover, although some sex workers begin work as a result of their addictions, some people turn to prostitution after drug addictions have ruined their lives, and left them with very few alternatives to support themselves otherwise.

== Factors associated with vulnerability ==
In a survey conducted and responded by male prostitutes, younger males performing sex work while using street drugs with a client are at the greatest risk of being attacked. The use of drugs among prostitutes is very high. A study was conducted with 200 street prostitutes to determine when prostitutes first get involved with drugs. The results showed that 55% of the subjects reported becoming addicted to drugs before they became prostitutes, 30% reported becoming addicted after becoming a prostitute, and 15% became addicted at the same time they became a prostitute. The study also revealed that the women's families often had alcohol and substance use throughout their lives. Substance use can lead someone towards prostitution and prostitution can lead someone to substance use. Prostitutes use many different drugs to help them deal with their problems. Marijuana is used to help relax, heroin is used to help increase emotional and physical stress tolerances, and cocaine and other stimulants are used to increase energy and confidence, so they are able to bring in more clients. When prostitutes use drugs, they often become addicted and have to continue prostituting to continue funding their addiction.

There are some common factors between prostitutes who are involved with drug use. If they frequently have unprotected sex, if they are HIV/AIDS positive or have any other sexually acquired infections, if they have any mental health issues or have recently undergone mental health treatment if they are homeless, or if they suffered physical and sexual abuse in adulthood they are much more likely to develop a substance use disorder. Drug users with multiple mental problems have higher rates of sharing injection needles with other people, lower rates of using condoms, having sex with multiple partners, sex trading, and having sex with an injecting drug user. Depression is also associated with drug use and prostitution. There are also trapping factors: injecting any kind of substance into their body, using hard drugs such as crack cocaine or methamphetamine, taking part in sex work while underage, working outdoors or in multiple areas, and having any convictions. These factors "trap" a person into the life they are in, especially if multiple of the factors affect them, making it much harder for them to escape their situation. The people most vulnerable to prostitution are those that have experienced these factors.

== The way behavioral therapies are used ==
Behavioral therapies help patients change their initial attitudes and behaviors that are related to drug use. For example, patients should be aware of the severe consequences of drugs after the therapies. In addition, a successful behavioral therapy should also help patients build up a set of healthy habits and lifestyles, as guiding and educating them is also an essential component of behavioral therapy. What's more, for an effective behavioral treatment, it is important to pair it with proper medication. As behavioral treatment mainly cures the patients mentally, while medication cures the patients physically. They are dependent on each other and should be used towards the patients simultaneously.

== Some principles of effective treatment ==
- As situations may differ significantly, there is no panacea that can cure every disease, including mental disorder.
- Treatment must be able to be easily and quickly accessed as emergent situations do occur under drug use.
- Effective treatment should address all of the patient's needs.
- Treatment should be consistent.
- The combination of medication and behavioral therapy (counseling) works efficiently.
- Treatment plans must be reviewed often and modified to fit the patient's changing needs.
- Treatment should take all possible mental disorders into account.
- Drug use must be monitored and prohibited continuously throughout the treatment in order to be effective.

== Risk factors ==
People of any age, sex, or economic status can become addicted to a drug. However, certain factors can affect the likelihood and speed of developing an addiction:

- Family history: If a person has a closely related family member that consumes drugs, it is more likely for them to also consume drugs.
- Being male: In cases of both substance use and prostitution, the ratio of male addicts is much higher than females.
- Having another mental health disorder: Other mental health disorders such as depression or post-traumatic stress disorder can increase the probability of drug use of a person.
- Peer pressure: Especially for teenagers and young adults, peer pressure is a prominent factor that may cause drug use.
- Anxiety, depression, and loneliness: These feelings may increase the likelihood of drug use and prostitution. Many drug users presume that using drugs is a good method to release their pressure and get rid of depressing feelings, while the consequence is actually completely the opposite, which is making their feelings even worse.

== See also ==
- Alcohol use disorder
- Date rape drug
- Dependence (behavioral medicine)
- Drug addiction
- Drug-related crime
- Pimp
- Prenatal cocaine exposure
- Prostitution
- Sex and drugs
- Sexually transmitted infection
