= HNR =

HNR may refer to

- Historical Novel Review, published by the Historical Novel Society
- MRC Human Nutrition Research
- Hazardous Noise Report, see Health effects from noise
