= Lynley Marshall =

Lynley Marshall is a consultant in paediatric and adolescent oncology drug development at the Royal Marsden Hospital in London, where she leads the Paediatric and Adolescent Oncology Drug Development team.

After completing her undergraduate training in Johannesburg, South Africa, and south west England, Marshall trained in paediatrics and then as a paediatric oncologist in University of Bristol and Oxford University. She holds a Ph.D. from the Institute of Cancer Research.

Marshall chairs the National Cancer Research Institute Children's cancer and Leukaemia Clinical Studies Novel Agents Subgroup, and is a member of the Innovative Therapies for Children with Cancer (ITCC) European Early Phase Trials Consortium.
