= John Newton (epidemiologist) =

British epidemiologist

John Newton OBE FRCP FFPH FRSPH
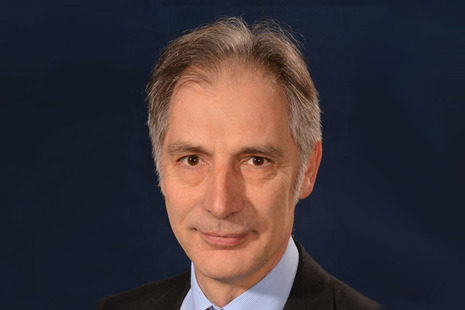
- Born: 7 January 1959 (age 67)
- Education: Shrewsbury School
- Alma mater: Trinity College, Oxford; King's College London; London School of Hygiene & Tropical Medicine

John Norman Newton (born 7 January 1959) is a British epidemiologist and public health expert. He was the Director of Health Improvement at Public Health England, and in 2020 coordinated the UK Government's COVID-19 testing programme.

== Education ==
He was educated at Shrewsbury School, Trinity College, Oxford (MA), King's College London (MBBS) and the London School of Hygiene & Tropical Medicine (MSc).

== Career ==
Newton was an academic epidemiologist at the University of Oxford, and the founding Chief Executive of the charity UK Biobank. He also served as director of research at Oxford's John Radcliffe Hospital and at University Hospital Southampton. He was appointed Honorary Professor of Public Health and Epidemiology in the Centre for Epidemiology at the University of Manchester in 2004, and Professor of Public Health and Epidemiology at the University of Exeter in May 2021.

In 2005 he led work for the UK Department of Health on a national public health information and intelligence strategy. He was appointed as Regional Director of Public Health for NHS South Central in 2007.

He has acted as an expert witness in epidemiology in relation to litigation since 1994, including on MMR and Autism, Norplant and Seroxat.

Newton was appointed as Director of Health Improvement for Public Health England on 12 October 2012.

From May to July 2020, he was national coordinator of the UK Government's coronavirus testing programme.

On 1 October 2021, following the abolition of Public Health England he became Director of Public Health Analysis in the newly formed Office for Health Improvement and Disparities.

Newton was appointed Officer of the Order of the British Empire in the 2023 Birthday Honours for services to public health.

== Other roles ==
From 2015 to 2019, Professor Newton chaired the World Health Organization's European Burden of Disease Network and led England's contribution to the Global Burden of Disease project, a study into the impacts of diseases on the world.

He was Vice President of the Faculty of Public Health (FPH) until 2022 and has been a director of Health Data Insight CIC. He is a fellow of the Royal College of Physicians of London (FRCP) and a fellow of the Royal Society for Public Health (FRSPH).

In June 2021, he was appointed President of the Scientific Board of Sante publique France.
