= NHS Health Check =

British medical screening programme

The NHS Health Check is a preventive healthcare programme in the United Kingdom offered by National Health Service. The programme invites adults aged between 40 and 74 in England for a health check-up every five years to screen for key conditions including heart disease, diabetes, kidney disease, and stroke. Local authorities are responsible for the commissioning of the programme, with GPs being the most common provider, followed by community outreach and pharmacy providers.

== Impact ==
Research in 2014 found no significant differences in the change to the risk of diabetes, hypertension, heart disease, chronic kidney disease or atrial fibrillation in general practices providing NHS Health Checks compared with control practices. In May 2016 researchers concluded that the checkup reduced the 10-year risk of cardiovascular disease by 0.21%, equivalent to one stroke or heart attack avoided every year for 4,762 people who attend.

In 2024 research showed that in the long-term the NHS Health Check contributes to the preventing the development of cardiovascular diseases and multiple other conditions. People who attend have a lower risk of dementia, heart attack, acute kidney problems and liver cirrhosis. This is probably due to the early detection of underlying conditions and starting treatment earlier than without the check-up. In 2026 it was reported that there was a 32% reduction in risk of death for patients in a diverse UK urban population who had attended at least one NHS Health Check.

== Attendance ==
Peter Walsh, deputy director of the Strategy Group at NHS England admitted that take-up of the checks was poor in January 2016, after a study showed that 20% of those eligible aged 60–74 attended and 9.0% of those between 40 and 59. In the five years from 2016 to 2021, the average uptake of an NHS Health Check following an invite was 46.5%.

=== Inequalities ===
Research found that take up in an ethnically diverse and socially deprived area of East London had increased from 7.3% of eligible patients in 2009 to 85.0% in 2013–2014. New diagnoses of diabetes were 30% more likely in attendees than nonattendees, hypertension 50%, and chronic kidney disease 80%.

Between 2016 and 2021, there were stark inequalities in uptake between the regions of England, particularly in areas of London, the North West, and the West Midlands.

== Elsewhere in the UK ==
=== Scotland ===
In Scotland, the Keep Well programme was introduced in October 2006 to screen for cardiovascular diseases and associated risk factors, with a focus on reducing health inequalities. Those over 40 years old were invited for a Keep Well check at least every five years. The programme operated in several waves, each with updated requirements and specifications, and its effectiveness was judged to be mixed. In December 2013, the Scottish Chief Medical Officer announced the Government would discontinue funding for the Keep Well programme. The programme subsequently ended in March 2017.

== History ==
In January 2008, UK Prime Minister Gordon Brown announced that preventive healthcare was planned to be offered throughout England to "monitor for heart disease, strokes, diabetes and kidney disease–conditions which affect the lives of 6.2 million people, cause 200,000 deaths each year and account for a fifth of all hospital admissions."

Some, such as the Glasgow GP Margaret McCartney, have criticised the programme of health checks as being without evidence of effectiveness. However, the head of health and wellbeing at Public Health England Kevin Fenton defended the programme, claiming it was evidence-based.

In August 2019, Matt Hancock announced that the checks would be more tailored to individuals’ risks.

On 22 May 2023, the Labour leader, Sir Keir Starmer, presented a plan to bring the National Health Service (NHS) “back on its feet” in the event that his party wins the general election. Starmer pledged to reduce deaths from heart diseases, cancer, and suicide in England. He made a commitment to reduce heart diseases and strokes by 25% over the next 10 years, along with reducing A&E waiting times and lowering suicide rates over the next five years.

== See also ==
- NHS in England
