= Anne Mackie =

Anne Mackie is the Director of Programmes for the UK National Screening Committee, which sets health screening policy throughout the UK by advising ministers and the NHS in the four UK countries about all aspects of screening, and supports implementation of screening programmes.

Mackie qualified as a doctor at King's College Hospital, London, in 1985, and has been working in public health for 20 years across London and the South East of England. She has also been the medical director of the National Specialist Commissioning Advisory Group, Director of Public Health in Kent and Director of Public Health in South West London. Prior to her current role she was the Director of Public Health for London SHA.

The UK National Screening Committee, of which Mackie is Director of Programmes, oversees 12 population screening programmes across the UK.
