= National Health Service (England) =

Publicly funded healthcare system in England

- Logo of the NHS in England

Service overview
- Formed: 5 July 1948 (78 years ago)
- Jurisdiction: England
- Employees: 1,364,784 FTE (October 2024)
- Annual budget: £190.3 billion (2022)
- Minister responsible: Yvette Cooper, Secretary of State for Health and Social Care
- Parent department: Department of Health and Social Care
- Website: www.nhs.uk

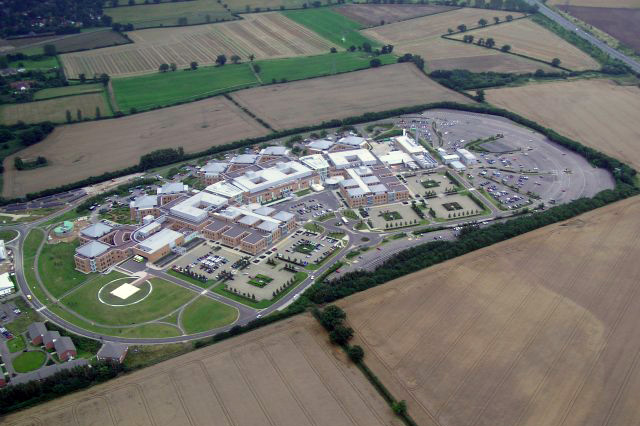
Norfolk and Norwich University Hospital, which with 1237 beds is one of the largest NHS hospitals

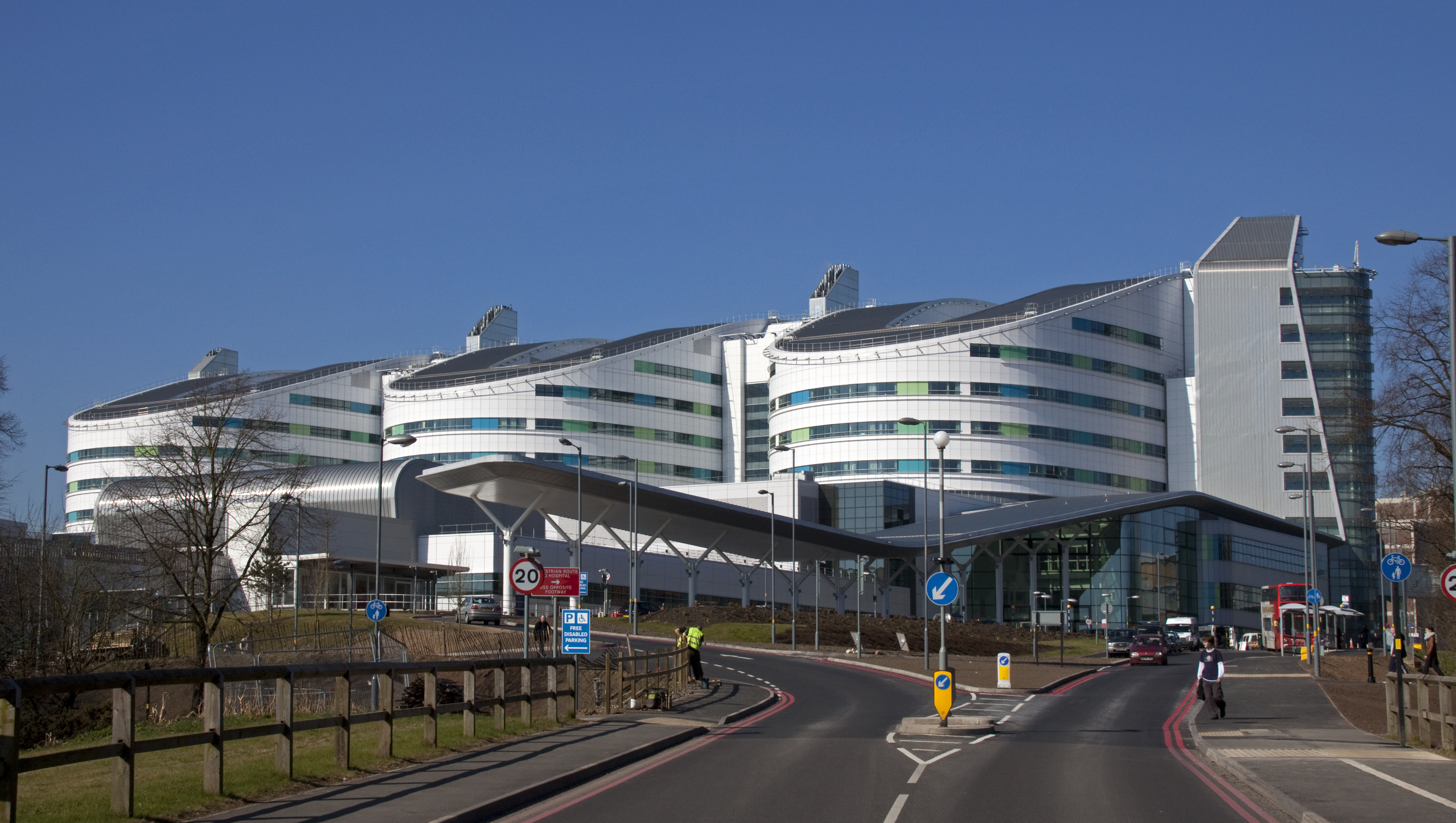
Queen Elizabeth Hospital Birmingham, another large NHS hospital in England, which has 1213 beds

The National Health Service (NHS) is the publicly funded healthcare system in England, and one of the four National Health Service systems in the United Kingdom. It is the second largest single-payer healthcare system in the world after the Brazilian Unified Health System. Primarily funded by the government from taxation and National Insurance contributions, and overseen by the Department of Health and Social Care, the NHS provides healthcare to all legal UK residents, with most services free at the point of use for most people. The NHS also conducts research through the National Institute for Health and Care Research (NIHR).

A founding principle of the NHS was providing free healthcare at the point of use. The 1942 cross-party Beveridge Report established the principles of the NHS which was implemented by the government, whilst under Labour control in 1948 and the NHS was officially launched at Park Hospital in Davyhulme, near Manchester, England (now known as Trafford General Hospital). Labour's Minister for Health Aneurin Bevan is popularly considered the NHS's founder, despite never formally being referred to as such. In practice, "free at the point of use" normally means that anyone legitimately registered with the system (i.e. in possession of an NHS number), that is a UK resident in clinical need of treatment, can access medical care, without payment. The exceptions include NHS services such as eye tests, dental care, prescriptions and aspects of long-term care. These charges are usually lower than equivalent services offered privately and many are free to vulnerable or low-income patients.

The NHS provides the majority of healthcare in England, including primary care, in-patient care, long-term healthcare, ophthalmology and dentistry. The National Health Service Act 1946 was enacted on 5 July 1948. Private health care has continued alongside the NHS, paid for largely by private insurance: it is used by about 8% of the population, generally as an add-on to NHS services.

The NHS is largely funded from general taxation and National Insurance payments, fees levied by changes in the Immigration Act 2014 and a small amount from patient charges. The UK government department responsible for the NHS is the Department of Health and Social Care, led by the Secretary of State for Health and Social Care. The Department of Health and Social Care had a £192 billion budget in 2024–25, most of which was spent on the NHS.

== History ==
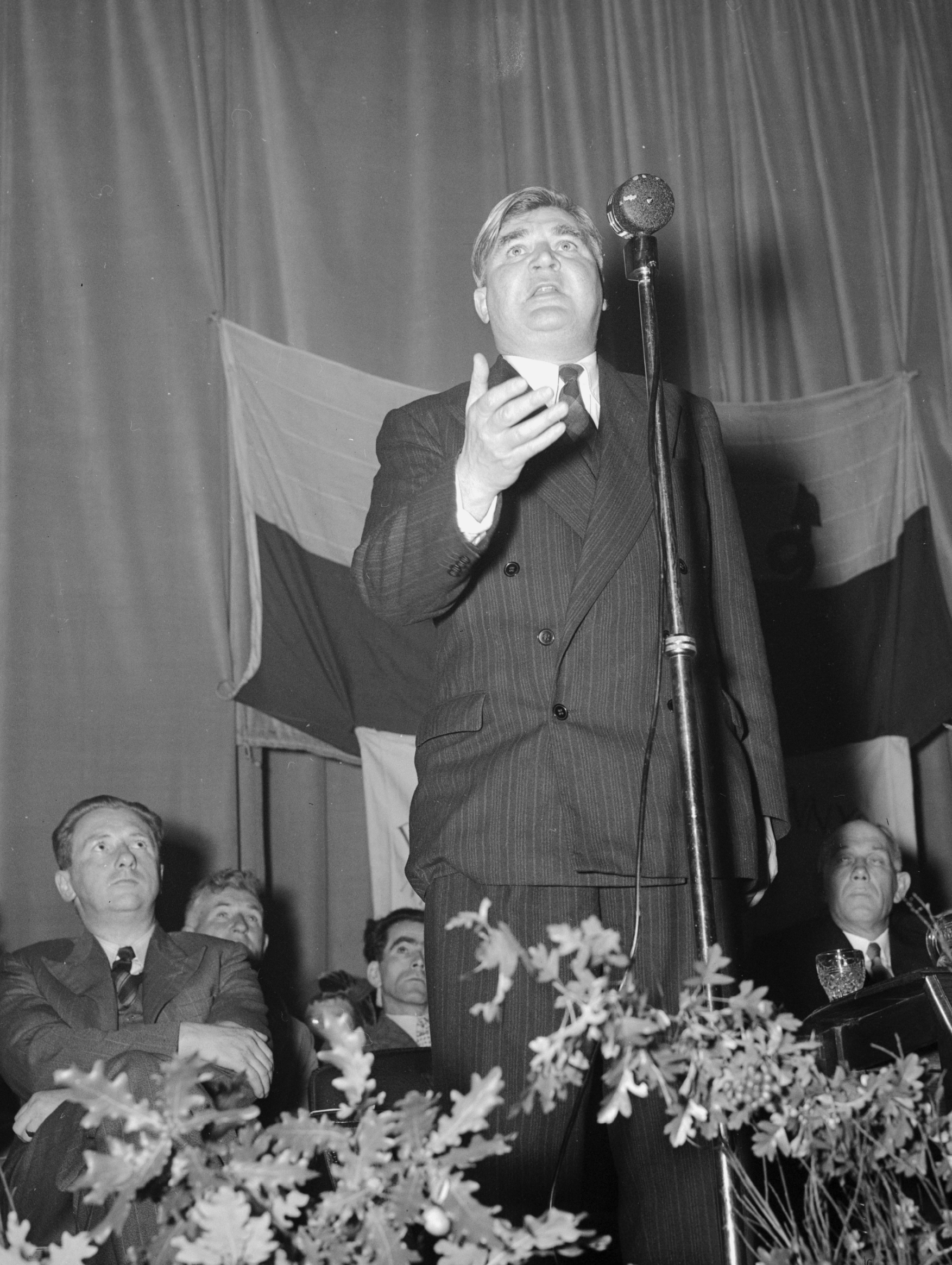
Aneurin Bevan. As health minister from 1945 to 1951, he spearheaded the establishment of the National Health Service

Leaflet concerning the launch of the NHS in England and Wales

A. J. Cronin's controversial novel The Citadel, published in 1937, had fomented extensive debate about the severe inadequacies of healthcare. The author's innovative ideas contributed to the conception of the NHS. Bevan commented in 1948 that "All I am doing is extending to the entire population of Britain the benefits we had in Tredegar for a generation or more". This comment came from his experience of his local community healthcare provisions.

A national health service was one of the fundamental assumptions in the Beveridge Report. The Emergency Hospital Service established in 1939 provided an example of what a National Health Service might look like.

Healthcare before the war had been an unsatisfactory mix of private, municipal, and charity schemes. Bevan decided that the way forward was a national system rather than a system operated by local authorities. He proposed that each resident of the UK would be signed up to a specific General Practice (GP) as the point of entry into the system, building on the foundations laid in 1912 by the introduction of National Insurance and the list system for general practice. Patients would have access to all medical, dental, and nursing care they needed without having to pay for it. The British Medical Association initially objected to the formation of the NHS.

In 1956 the first kidney dialysis was performed. Preventing disease also became a focus, with a polio immunisation programme and another for whooping cough in 1957. 1960 saw the first kidney transplant and implantable heart pacemaker usage. In 1962 the NHS completed its first hip replacement. A measles vaccine was introduced in 1968 and the first heart transplant was at an NHS hospital. In 1979, the first bone marrow transplant was completed at Great Ormond Street Hospital.

== Organisation ==
The NHS was established within the differing nations of the United Kingdom through differing legislation, and as such there has never been a singular British healthcare system; instead, there are four health services in the United Kingdom: NHS England, the NHS Scotland, HSC Northern Ireland, and NHS Wales, which were run by the respective UK government ministries for each home nation before falling under the control of devolved governments in 1999. In 2009, NHS England agreed to a formal NHS constitution, which sets out the legal rights and responsibilities of the NHS, its staff, and users of the service, and makes additional non-binding pledges regarding many key aspects of its operations.

The composition of the NHS has been subject to significant and repeated change since its creation, but especially from 1991 onwards following the passing of the NHS and Community Care Act 1990 and the introduction of the health service internal market. This process can be broadly divided into 3 main periods of change: from 1991 to 1997, focused on the introduction of internal market reforms and establishing the purchaser-provider split, from 1997 to 2010, when focus shifted towards patient choice and reducing wait times, and from 2010 onwards, aiming to increase local and national autonomy and integrate care across levels.

The Health and Social Care Act 2012 came into effect in April 2013, giving GP-led groups responsibility for commissioning most local NHS services. Starting in April 2013, primary care trusts (PCTs) began to be replaced by general practitioner (GP)-led organizations called clinical commissioning groups (CCGs). Under the new system, a new NHS Commissioning Board, called NHS England, oversees the NHS from the Department of Health. The Act has also become associated with the perception of increased private provision of NHS services. In reality, the provision of NHS services by private companies long precedes this legislation, but there are concerns that the new role of the healthcare regulator ('Monitor') could lead to increased use of private-sector competition, balancing care options between private companies, charities, and NHS organizations. NHS trusts responded to the Nicholson challenge—which involved making £20 billion in savings across the service by 2015.

Organisational history of the National Health Service in England
National Government	Ministry of Health (1919–1968)	Department of Health and Social Security (1968–1988)		Department of Health (1988 –2018)			Department of Health and Social Care (2018–Present)
National Level				NHS Executive (1996–2002)		NHS England † (2011–Present)	
Regional Level	Regional Hospital Boards (1947–1974)	Regional Health Authorities (1974–1996)		NHS Executive Regional Offices (1996–2002)	Strategic Health Authorities (2002–2013)		
District Level		Area Health Authorities (1974–1982)	District Health Authorities (1982–1996)	Health Authorities (1996–2002)		Clinical Commissioning Groups (2013–2022)	Integrated Care Boards (2022–Present)
Local Level	Hospital Management Committees (1947–1974)			NHS Trusts (1990–Present)			

† Note that NHS England is due to be dissolved by 2027 and its functions absorbed into the Department of Health and Social Care with the anticipated introduction of the NHS Modernisation Bill into parliament in 2026.

== Core principles ==
The principal NHS website states the following as core principles:

The NHS was born out of a long-held ideal that good healthcare should be available to all, regardless of wealth. At its launch by the then minister of health, Aneurin Bevan, on 5 July 1948, it had at its heart three core principles:

- That it meets the needs of everyone
- That it is free at the point of delivery
- That it is based on clinical need, not the ability to pay

These three principles have guided the development of the NHS for more than half a century and remain. However, in July 2000, a full-scale modernization program was launched and new principles were added.

The main aims of the additional principles are that the NHS will:

- Provide a comprehensive range of services
- Shape its services around the needs and preferences of individual patients, their families, and their carers
- Respond to the different needs of different populations
- Work continuously to improve the quality of services and to minimize errors
- Support and value its staff
- Use public funds for healthcare devoted solely to NHS patients
- Work with others to ensure a seamless service for patients
- Help to keep people healthy and work to reduce health inequalities
- Respect the confidentiality of individual patients and provide open access to information about services, treatment, and performance

=== Structure ===
The English NHS is controlled by the UK government through the Department of Health and Social Care (DHSC), which takes political responsibility for the service. Resource allocation and oversight was delegated to NHS England, an arm's-length body, by the Health and Social Care Act 2012. NHS England commissions primary care services (including GPs) and some specialist services, and allocates funding to 211 geographically based clinical commissioning groups (CCGs) across England. The CCGs commission most services in their areas, including hospital and community-based healthcare.

In March 2025, the government announced that NHS England would be abolished, with the provision of NHS services in England instead being managed directly by central government. The news was met with both positive comments praising the government for taking action to reduce bureaucracy, and criticism from health unions and think tanks concerned about the quality of NHS services.

Several types of organizations are commissioned to provide NHS services, including NHS trusts and private sector companies. Many NHS trusts have become NHS foundation trusts, giving them an independent legal status and greater financial freedoms. The following types of NHS trusts and foundation trusts provide NHS services in specific areas:

- acute trusts administer hospitals, treatment centres and specialist care in around 1,600 NHS hospitals (some trusts run between 2 and 8 different hospital sites)
- ambulance services trusts
- Care trusts, providing both health and social care services
- mental health trusts, specialising in managing and treating mental illness, including by the use of involuntary commitment powers

Some services are provided at a national level, including:

- www.nhs.uk is the primary public-facing NHS website, providing comprehensive official information on services, treatments, conditions, healthy living and current health topics
- Special health authorities provide various types of services

=== Staffing ===
England's NHS is the largest employer in Europe, with one in every 25 adults in England working for the NHS. Nursing staff accounted for the largest cohort at more than 330,000 employees, followed by clinical support staff at 290,000, scientific and technical staff at 163,000 and physicians at 133,000.

In the year ending in March 2017, there were 1.187 million staff in England's NHS, 1.9% more than in March 2016. There were 34,260 unfilled nursing and midwifery posts in England by September 2017, this was the highest level since records began. 23% of women giving birth were left alone part of the time causing anxiety to the women and possible danger to them and their babies. This is because there are too few midwives. Neonatal mortality rose from 2.6 deaths for every 1,000 births in 2015 to 2.7 deaths per 1,000 births in 2016. Infant mortality (deaths during the first year of life) rose from 3.7 to 3.8 per 1,000 live births during the same period. Assaults on NHS staff have increased, there were 56,435 recorded physical assaults on staff in 2016–2017, 9.7% more than the 51,447 the year before. Low staffing levels and delays in patients being treated are blamed for this.

Nearly all hospital doctors and nurses in England are employed by the NHS and work in NHS-run hospitals, with teams of more junior hospital doctors (most of whom are in training) being led by consultants, each of whom is trained to provide expert advice and treatment within a specific specialty. From 2017, NHS doctors must reveal how much money they make from private practice.

General practitioners, dentists, optometrists (opticians), and other providers of local health care are almost all self-employed and contract their services back to the NHS. They may operate in partnership with other professionals, own and operate their surgeries and clinics, and employ their staff, including other doctors, etc. However, the NHS does sometimes provide centrally employed healthcare professionals and facilities in areas where there is insufficient provision by self-employed professionals.

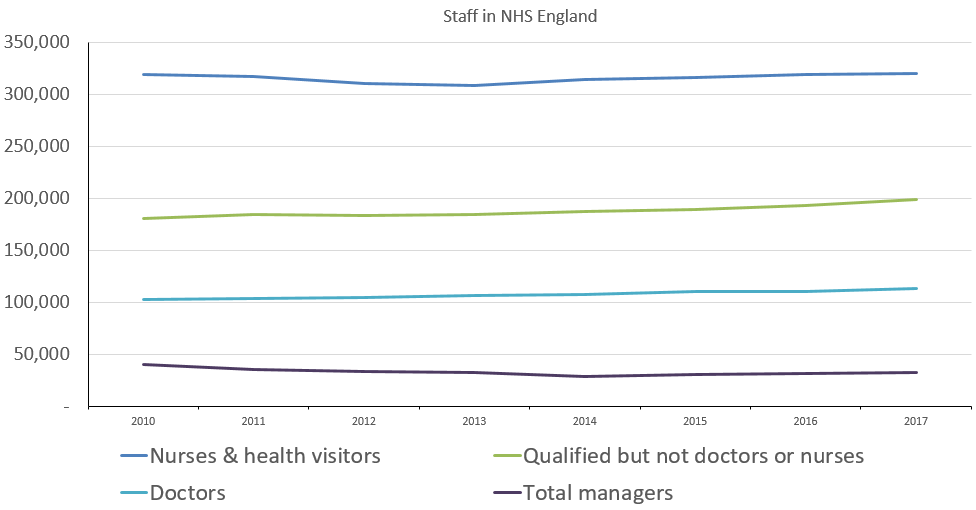
Staff in NHS England from 2010 to 2017

Year	Nurses	Doctors	Other qualified	Managers	Total
1978	339,658	55,000	26,000	-	1,003,000 (UK)
2010	318,935	102,422	180,621	40,025	1,168,750
2011	317,157	103,898	184,869	35,014	1,158,920
2012	310,359	105,019	183,818	33,023	1,128,140
2013	308,782	106,151	184,571	32,429	1,123,529
2014	314,097	107,896	187,699	28,499	1,126,947
2015	316,117	109,890	189,321	30,221	1,143,102
2016	318,912	110,732	193,073	31,523	1,164,471
2017	319,845	113,508	198,783	32,588	1,187,125

Note that due to methodological changes, the 1978 figure is not directly comparable with later figures.

A 2012 analysis by the BBC estimated that the NHS across the whole UK has 1.7 million staff, which made it fifth on the list of the world's largest employers (well above Indian Railways). In 2015 the Health Service Journal reported that there were 587,647 non-clinical staff in the English NHS. 17% worked supporting clinical staff. 2% in cleaning and 14% administrative. 16,211 were finance staff.

The NHS plays a unique role in the training of new doctors in England, with approximately 8,000 places for student doctors each year, all of which are attached to an NHS University Hospital trust. After completing medical school, these new doctors must go on to complete a two-year foundation training program to become fully registered with the General Medical Council. Most go on to complete their foundation training years in an NHS hospital although some may opt for alternative employers such as the armed forces. Most NHS staff, including non-clinical staff and GPs (although most GPs are self-employed), are eligible to join the NHS Pension Scheme—which, from 1 April 2015, is an average-salary defined-benefit scheme. Among the current challenges with recruiting staff are pay, work pressure, and difficulty recruiting and retaining staff from EU countries due to Brexit. and there are fears that doctors could also leave.

In March 2021, the Department of Health and Social Care made a non-binding recommendation that NHS staff in England should receive a 1% pay rise for 2021–2022, citing the 'uncertain' financial situation and the current low inflation. This is estimated to cost £500 million a year, as almost half of the NHS's budget goes on staffing costs (at £56.1 billion). The Trades Union Congress estimated that nurses' pay would be £2,500 less than in 2010, paramedics' pay would be £3,330 less and porters' pay would be £850 less due to inflation. The Royal College of Nursing has criticized the pay rise, calling it 'pitiful' and said that nurses should be getting 12.5% more; it has also agreed to set up a £35m fund to support members in the event of a strike. Other unions have threatened strike actions and warned that the proposal could lead to staff quitting their jobs, worsening staffing issues. The Labour Party similarly criticized the proposal as 'reprehensible' and claimed that it goes against a government 'promise' made in 2020 to give NHS workers a 2.1% pay rise, which was voted for in a long-term spending plan in January 2020 but the Department of Health considered to be not legally binding. Prime Minister Boris Johnson defended the 1% pay rise, stating that the government was giving workers "as much as we can" in light of the COVID-19 pandemic and that he was "massively grateful" to the health and social care workers. Secretary of State for Health and Social Care Matt Hancock and Secretary of State for Education Gavin Williamson similarly argued that the decision was due to an assessment of what was affordable due to the pandemic and that NHS staff was excluded from a wider public sector pay freeze. Shadow Secretary of State for Health and Social Care Jon Ashworth clarified that Labour would "honour whatever the review body recommends".

At the end of 2021, there were 99,000 vacancies in the English NHS. 39,000 more nurses were needed, together with 1,400 more anesthetists, 1,900 more radiologists, and 2,500 more GPs.

Miriam Deakin of NHS Providers stated there were 133,000 NHS vacancies in late 2022. The NHS vacancy rate was 6.7% in March 2025, down from 6.9% in March 2024.

==== Uniform ====
In 2025 a scheme was announced by the NHS Supply Chain to introduce a standardised approach to uniforms in England. About £23 million is spent on uniforms across the NHS in England each year, and each trust has its own. The intention is to include about 600,000 clinical staff, and to make significant savings. The chosen base colours and contrasting trim for the top are to denote each professional group.

=== 2012 reforms ===
The coalition government's white paper on health reform, published in July 2010, set out a significant reorganization of the NHS. The white paper, Equity and excellence: liberating the NHS, with implications for all health organisations in the NHS abolishing primary care trusts and strategic health authorities. It claimed to shift power from the center to GPs and patients, moving somewhere between £60 and £80 billion into the hands of clinical commissioning group to commission services. The bill became law in March 2012 with a government majority of 88 and following more than 1,000 amendments in the House of Commons and the House of Lords.

== Funding ==
The total budget of the Department of Health in England in 2017/18 was £124.7 billion. £13.8 billion was spent on medicines. The National Audit Office reports annually on the summarised consolidated accounts of the NHS.

The population of England is aging, which has led to an increase in health demand and funding. From 2011 to 2018, the population of England increased by about 6%. The number of patients admitted to hospital in an emergency went up by 15%. There were 542,435 emergency hospital admissions in England in October 2018, 5.8% more than in October 2017. Health spending in England is expected to rise from £112 billion in 2009/10 to £127 billion in 2019/20 (in real terms), and spending per head will increase by 3.5%.

However, according to the Institute for Fiscal Studies (IFS), compared to the increase necessary to keep up with a rising population that is also ageing, spending will fall by 1.3% from 2009–10 to 2019–20. George Stoye, senior research economist of the IFS, and said the annual increases since 2009-10 were "the lowest rate of increase over any similar period since the mid-1950s, since when the long-run annual growth rate has been 4.1%". This has led to cuts to some services, despite the overall increase in funding. In 2017, funding increased by 1.3% while demand rose by 5%. Ted Baker, Chief Inspector of Hospitals has said that the NHS is still running the model it had in the 1960s and 1970s and has not modernised due to lack of investment. The British Medical Association (BMA) has called for £10bn more annually for the NHS to get in line with what other advanced European nations spend on health. In June 2018 ahead of the NHS' 70th Anniversary then Prime Minister Theresa May announced extra funding for the NHS worth an average real terms increase of 3.4% a year, reaching £20.5 billion extra in 2023/24.

Jeremy Hunt describes the process of setting the NHS budget as far too random – "decided on the back of headlines, elections and anniversaries rather than on rational calculations of demand and cost".

=== The commissioning system ===
From 2003 to 2013 the principal fundholders in the NHS system were the primary care trusts (PCTs), which commissioned healthcare from NHS trusts, GPs, and private providers. PCTs disbursed funds to them on an agreed tariff or contract basis, on guidelines set out by the Department of Health. The PCTs budget from the Department of Health was calculated on a formula basis relating to population and specific local needs. They were supposed to "break-even" – that is, not show a deficit on their budgets at the end of the financial year. Failure to meet financial objectives could result in the dismissal and replacement of a trust's board of directors, although such dismissals are enormously expensive for the NHS.

In April 2013 a new system was established as a result of the Health and Social Care Act 2012. The NHS budget is largely in the hands of a new body, NHS England. NHS England commissions specialist services and primary care. Acute services and community care are commissioned by local clinical commissioning groups (CCGs) led by GPs. From April 2021 all CCGs have become part of Integrated Care Systems.

=== Free services and contributory services ===
==== Services free at the point of use ====
The vast majority of NHS services are free at the point of use.

This means that people generally do not pay anything for their doctor visits, nursing services, surgical procedures or appliances, consumables such as medications and bandages, plasters, medical tests, and investigations, x-rays, CT or MRI scans, or other diagnostic services. Hospital inpatient and outpatient services are free, both medical and mental health services. Funding for these services is provided through general taxation and not a specific tax.

Because the NHS is not funded by a contributory insurance scheme in the ordinary sense and most patients pay nothing for their treatment there is thus no billing to the treated person nor any insurer or sickness fund as is common in many other countries. This saves hugely on administration costs that might otherwise involve complex consumable tracking and usage procedures at the patient level and concomitant invoicing, reconciliation, and bad debt processing.

=== Eligibility ===
Eligibility for NHS services is based on having ordinary resident status, regardless of nationality.

==== Prescription charges ====
Prescriptions for medication in England and Wales are subject to a fixed charge per item for up to three months' supply, regardless of the actual cost of the medicine. Some people qualify for free prescriptions. Higher charges apply to medical appliances. Pharmacies or other dispensing contractors are reimbursed for the actual cost of the medicines through NHS Prescription Services, a division of the NHS Business Services Authority.

As of March 2023 the NHS prescription charge in England was £9.35 per item (in Scotland, Wales and Northern Ireland there is no charge for items prescribed on the NHS). People over sixty, children under sixteen (or under nineteen if in full-time education), patients with certain medical conditions, and those with low incomes, are exempt from charges, subject to penalties for claiming exemption when not entitled. Those who require repeated prescriptions may purchase a single-charge pre-payment certificate that allows unlimited prescriptions during its period of validity.

The high and rising costs of some medicines, especially some types of cancer treatment, means that prescriptions can present a heavy burden to the primary care trusts, whose limited budgets include responsibility for the difference between medicine costs and the low, fixed prescription charge. This has led to disputes whether some expensive drugs (e.g., Herceptin) should be prescribed by the NHS.

==== NHS dentistry ====
The position of dentistry within the NHS has been contested frequently. At the inception of the NHS, three branches of dental service were established: local health authority dental service; general practitioner service; and hospital dental service. Dental treatment was initially free at the point of use; however charges were introduced in 1951 for dentures – leading to the resignation of the architect of the NHS and Minister for Labour, Aneurin Bevan in March 1951 – and in 1952 for other treatments.

Dentists are private contractors to the NHS, which means practitioners must purchase and maintain the practice premises, equip the surgery, and hire staff to provide an NHS dental service. The contract between the NHS and dentists determines what work is provided for under the NHS, payments to dentists, and charges to patients. The contract is regularly revised – in 2003, the Government announced major changes to NHS dentistry, giving primary care trusts (PCTs) responsibility for commissioning NHS dental services in response to local needs, and using NHS contracts to influence where dental practices were located, and in 2006 a new contract was introduced following Department of Health recommendations on how to cash limit NHS primary care dentistry. Professional bodies such as the British Dental Association have complained that the 2006 contract changes introduced a remuneration system which fails to incentivize disease prevention, leading to declining patient outcomes and that radical reform was needed.

NHS dentistry charges as of April 2017 were: £20.60 for an examination; £56.30 for a filling or extraction; and £244.30 for more complex procedures such as crowns, dentures, or bridges. As of 2007, less than half of dentists' income came from treating patients under NHS coverage; about 52% of dentists' income was from treating private patients.

==== NHS Optical Services ====
From 1 April 2024, the NHS Sight Test Fee (in England) was £23.53, and there were 13.1 million NHS sight tests carried out in the UK.

For those who qualify through need, the sight test is free, and a voucher system is employed to pay for or reduce the cost of lenses. There is a free spectacles frame and most opticians keep a selection of low-cost items. For those who already receive certain means-tested benefits, or who otherwise qualify, participating opticians use tables to find the amount of the subsidy.

==== Injury cost recovery scheme ====
Under older legislation (mainly the Road Traffic Act 1930) a hospital treating the victims of a road traffic accident was entitled to limited compensation (under the 1930 Act before any amendment, up to £25 per person treated) from the insurers of driver(s) of the vehicle(s) involved, but were not compelled to do so and often did not do so; the charge was in turn covered by the then legally required element of those drivers' motor vehicle insurance (commonly known as Road Traffic Act insurance when a driver held only that amount of insurance). As the initial bill went to the driver rather than the insurer, even when a charge was imposed it was often not passed on to the liable insurer. It was common to take no further action in such cases, as there was no practical financial incentive (and often a financial disincentive due to potential legal costs) for individual hospitals to do so.

The Road Traffic (NHS Charges) Act 1999 introduced a standard national scheme for recovery of costs using a tariff based on a single charge for out-patient treatment or a daily charge for in-patient treatment; these charges again ultimately fell upon insurers. This scheme did not however fully cover the costs of treatment in serious cases.

Since January 2007, the NHS must claim back the cost of treatment, and ambulance services, for those who have been paid personal injury compensation. In the last year of the scheme immediately preceding 2007, over £128 million was reclaimed.

From April 2019 £725 is payable for outpatient treatment, £891 per day for inpatient treatment and £219 per ambulance journey.

==== Car park charges ====
Car parking charges are a minor source of revenue for the NHS, with most hospitals deriving about 0.25% of their budget from them. The level of fees is controlled individually by each trust. In 2006 car park fees contributed £78 million towards hospital budgets. Patient groups are opposed to such charges. This contrasts with Scotland where car park charges were mostly scrapped from the beginning of 2009 and with Wales where car park charges were scrapped at the end of 2011.

==== Charitable funds ====
There are over 300 official NHS charities in England and Wales. Collectively, they hold assets over £2 billion and have an annual income of over £300 million. Some NHS charities have their independent board of trustees whilst in other cases the relevant NHS trust acts as a corporate trustee. Charitable funds are typically used for medical research, larger items of medical equipment, aesthetic and environmental improvements, or services that increase patient comfort.

In addition to official NHS charities, many other charities raise funds that are spent through the NHS, particularly in connection with medical research and capital appeals.

Regional lotteries were also common for fundraising, and in 1988, a National Health Service Lottery was approved by the government before being found illegal. The idea continued to become the National Lottery.

== Outsourcing and privatisation ==
Although the NHS routinely outsources the equipment and products that it uses and dentistry, eye care, pharmacy, and most GP practices are provided by the private sector, the outsourcing of hospital health care has always been controversial. The involvement of private companies regularly draws the suspicion of NHS staff, the media and the public.

Outsourcing and privatization have increased in recent years, with NHS spending on the private sector rising from £4.1 billion in 2009–10 to £8.7 billion in 2015–16. The King's Fund's January 2015 report on the Coalition Government's 2012 reforms concluded that while marketization had increased, claims of mass privatization were exaggerated. Private firms provide services in areas such as community service, general practice and mental health care. An article in The Independent suggested that the private sector tends to choose to deliver the services that are the most profitable, additionally, because the private sector does not have intensive care facilities if things go wrong.

== Research and trials ==
In January 2026, NHS England launched a trial combining artificial intelligence (AI) and robot-assisted care to improve the speed and accuracy of lung cancer detection and diagnosis. The initiative coincided with NHS England’s commitment to offer lung cancer screening to all current and former smokers by 2030. NHS England stated that the planned screening expansion could result in an estimated 50,000 lung cancer diagnoses by 2035, including around 23,000 identified at an early stage, potentially saving thousands of lives.

== Sustainability and transformation plans ==
Sustainability and transformation plans were produced in 2016 as a method of dealing with the service's financial problems. These plans appear to involve loss of services and are highly controversial. The plans are possibly the most far-reaching change to health services for decades and the plans should contribute to redesigning care to manage increased patient demand. Some A&E units will close, concentrating hospital care in fewer places. Nearly two-thirds of senior doctors fear the plans will worsen patient care.

Consultation will start over cost saving, streamlining, and some service reduction in the National Health Service. The streamlining will lead to ward closures including psychiatric ward closures and a reduction in the number of beds in many areas among other changes. There is concern that hospital beds are being closed without increased community provision.

Sally Gainsbury of the Nuffield Trust think tank said many current transformation plans involve shifting or closing services. Gainsbury added: "Our research finds that, in a lot of these kinds of reconfigurations, you don't save very much money – all that happens is the patient has to go to the next hospital down the road. They're more inconvenienced ... but it rarely saves the money that's needed." By contrast, NHS England claims that the plans bring joined-up care closer to home. Senior Liberal Democrat MP Norman Lamb accepted that the review made sense in principle but stated: "It would be scandalous if the government simply hoped to use these plans as an excuse to cut services and starve the NHS of the funding it desperately needs. While the NHS must become more efficient and sustainable for future generations, redesigning of care models will only get us so far – and no experts believe the Conservative doctrine that an extra £8bn funding by 2020 will be anywhere near enough."

=== Whistleblowing ===
In an independent review in 2016 by Robert Francis, it was concluded that some staff in England felt unable or unwilling to raise concerns about standards of care due to fear or low expectations, and that some staff who raised concerns had bad experiences and suffered unjustifiable consequences which the report described as "shocking". There is a culture of bullying towards those who raise concerns. This response may consist of placing the whistleblower on performance review, providing no assistance to them, starting a review process that can take months or years, possibly leading to mental health problems, and bullying and victimization by other staff. This process rarely ended with being redeployed in an organization, instead resulting in retirement, dismissal, or alternative employment.

An issue identified by the report was the use of "gagging clauses" involved in settlements surrounding the termination of employment of those who whistleblow. While the report found that all the contracts were legal, it noted that the language used was often complicated and legalistic, a culture of fear deterred public interest disclosures even when they were not in breach of contract, and that the terms were often unnecessarily restrictive, for example by making the existence of the agreement confidential.

Surgeon Peter Duffy wrote about his experiences of whistleblowing following an avoidable death in an independently published book, Whistle In the Wind.

In research from BMA, 81% of respondents (NHS workers) believed they were only partly or not at all protected during the third wave. BMA also stated that the British government was unprepared for the COVID-19 outbreak and that the underfunding of the NHS left the UK 'Brutally exposed' with 'too few staff and too few beds'. One Doctor even claimed, regarding masks '"We made our own and bought our own when we could find any—we depended on friends sourcing FFP3 masks, my son's school 3D printing visors". This research revealed that during the COVID-19 pandemic, NHS employees believed the government had treated them unjustly. The report they released was also believed to be the first of its kind to be ever done where researchers go to the doctors themselves regarding policy-making during the COVID-19 pandemic.

== NHS policies and programmes ==
=== Changes under the Thatcher government ===
The 1980s saw the introduction of modern management processes (General Management) in the NHS to replace the previous system of consensus management. This was outlined in the Griffiths Report of 1983. This recommended the appointment of general managers in the NHS with whom responsibility should lie. The report also recommended that clinicians be better involved in management. Financial pressures continued to place strain on the NHS. In 1987, an additional £101 million was provided by the government to the NHS. In 1988 Prime Minister Margaret Thatcher announced a review of the NHS. From this review in 1989 two white papers Working for Patients and Caring for People were produced. These outlined the introduction of what was termed the internal market, which was to shape the structure and organization of health services for most of the next decade.

In England, the National Health Service and Community Care Act 1990 defined this "internal market", whereby health authorities ceased to run hospitals but "purchased" care from their own or other authorities' hospitals. Certain GPs became "fund holders" and were able to purchase care for their patients. The "providers" became independent trusts, which encouraged competition but also increased local differences. Increasing competition may have been statistically associated with poor patient outcomes.

Along with the push to privatize the delivery of NHS services came a growing interest in private medical care and private insurance with which to pay for it. Three companies, the British Union Provident Association (BUPA, 76.4%), Private Patient's Plan (PPP, 19.7%), and Western Provident Association (WPA, 0.9%) captured nearly the entire market in the early 1980s, a situation which would continue into the early 1990s. The early players became advocates for political changes to encourage switching to private healthcare, such as tax deductions for private health insurance premiums. At times they were also critical of what they saw as overcharging of private patients by UK hospitals.

Around 2007 companies launched insurance plans which provided a health "top-up" cover meant to supplement NHS treatment, including reimbursement for cancer drugs which the NHS had not approved for use. This led to criticism, among other things, that the products would undermine the values of the NHS and risk creating a two-tier system in health care. The NHS at times resisted this change, for its part, attempted to block these developments, levying "top-up fees" on NHS services where patients also received private health care. WPA claimed to have received legal advice saying such payments were unlawful.

=== Changes under the Blair government ===
These innovations, especially the "fund holder" option, were condemned at the time by the Labour Party. Opposition to what was claimed to be the Conservative intention to privatise the NHS became a major feature of Labour's election campaigns.

Labour came to power in 1997 with the promise to remove the "internal market" and abolish fundholding. However, in his second term, Blair renounced this direction. He pursued measures to strengthen the internal market as part of his plan to "modernize" the NHS.

Several factors drove these reforms; they include the rising costs of medical technology and medicines, the desire to improve standards and "patient choice", an aging population, and a desire to contain government expenditure. (Since the National Health Services in Wales, Scotland, and Northern Ireland are not controlled by the UK government, these reforms have increased the differences between the National Health Services in different parts of the United Kingdom. See NHS Wales and NHS Scotland for descriptions of their developments).

Reforms included (amongst other actions) the laying down of detailed service standards, strict financial budgeting, revised job specifications, reintroduction of "fundholding" (under the description "practice-based commissioning"), closure of surplus facilities and emphasis on rigorous clinical and corporate governance. Some new services were developed to help manage demand, including NHS Direct. The Agenda for Change agreement aimed to provide harmonized pay and career progression. These changes have given rise to controversy within the medical professions, the news media, and the public. The British Medical Association in a 2009 document on Independent Sector Treatment Centres (ISTCs) urged the government to restore the NHS to a service based on public provision, not private ownership; co-operation, not competition; integration, not fragmentation; and public service, not private profits.

The Blair government, whilst leaving services free at the point of use, encouraged outsourcing of medical services and support to the private sector. Under the Private Finance Initiative, an increasing number of hospitals were built (or rebuilt) by private sector consortia; hospitals may have both medical services such as ISTCs and non-medical services such as catering provided under long-term contracts by the private sector. A study by a consultancy company for the Department of Health shows that every £200 million spent on privately financed hospitals will result in the loss of 1000 doctors and nurses. The first PFI hospitals contain some 28 percent fewer beds than the ones they replaced.

The NHS was also required to take on pro-active socially "directive" policies, for example, in respect of smoking and obesity.

=== Information technology ===
In the 1980s and 90s, NHS IT spent money on several failed IT projects. The Wessex project, in the 1980s, attempted to standardize IT systems across a regional health authority. The London Ambulance Service was to be a computer-aided dispatch system. Read code was an attempt to develop a new electronic language of health, later scheduled to be replaced by SNOMED CT.

The NHS Information Authority (NHSIA) was established by an Act of Parliament in 1999 to bring together four NHS IT and Information bodies (NHS Telecoms, Family Health Service (FHS), NHS Centre for Coding and Classification (CCC) and NHS Information Management Group (IMG)) to work together to deliver IT infrastructure and information solutions to the NHS in England. A 2002 plan was for NHSIA to implement four national IT projects: Basic infrastructure, Electronic records, Electronic prescribing, and Electronic booking, modeled after the large NHS Direct tele-nurse and healthcare website program. The NHSIA functions were divided into other organisations by April 2005.

In 2002, the NHS National Programme for IT (NPfIT) was announced by the Department of Health. It was widely seen as a failure, and blamed for delaying the implementation of IT in the service. Even in 2020, it appeared most of the 1.38 million NHS computers were still using Windows 7, which was released in 2009, and additional support had to be arranged by Microsoft until 14 January 2021 before the migration to Windows 10 could be completed. NHSX, the organization set up to manage NHS information technology was supervising the migration and has the power to impose sanctions on laggards.

Despite problems with internal IT programs, the NHS has broken new ground in providing health information to the public via the Internet. In June 2007 the NHS website was relaunched under the banner "NHS Choices" as a comprehensive health information service for the public. In a break with the norm for government sites, the NHS website allowed users to add public comments giving their views on individual hospitals and to add comments to the articles it carries. It also enabled users to compare hospitals for treatment via a "scorecard". In April 2009 it became the first official site to publish hospital death rates (Hospital Standardised Mortality Rates) for the whole of England. Its Behind the Headlines daily health news analysis service, which critically appraises media stories and the science behind them, was declared Best Innovation in Medical Communication in the prestigious BMJ Group Awards 2009. and in a 2015 case study was found to provide highly accurate and detailed information when compared to other sources In 2012, NHS England launched the NHS Apps Library, listing apps that had been reviewed by clinicians. In 2018, the NHS announced they would abandon the name NHS Choices, and in the future, call the site the NHS website. This coincided with the launch of the NHS app.

Eleven of the NHS hospitals in the West London Cancer Network were linked using the IOCOM Grid System in 2009. This helped increase collaboration and meeting attendance and even improved clinical decisions.

Twenty-one different electronic systems were used in the NHS in England to record data on patients in 2019. These systems do not communicate well with each other so a risk doctors are treating a patient will not know everything they need to know to treat the patient effectively. There were 11 million patient interactions out of 121 million where information from a previous visit could not be accessed. Half the Trusts using Electronic Medical Records use one of three systems and at least those three should be able to share information. A tenth of Trusts used multiple systems in the same hospital. Leigh Warren who participated in the research said: "Hospitals and GPs often don't have the right information about the right patient in the right place at the right time. This can lead to errors and accidents that can threaten patients' lives."

In February 2022 Sajid Javid declared that at least 90% of NHS trusts should have electronic patient record systems by the end of 2023 and that the remaining 10% of trusts without them must be in the implementation phase by December 2023. He wants 80% of social care providers to have a digital record in place by March 2024. He also said he wanted 75% of adults in England to have downloaded the NHS App by March 2024.

==== Sale of data ====
Information on millions of NHS patients in England was sold to international pharmaceutical companies, in the US and other nations for research, adding to concerns over USA ambitions to access remunerative parts of the NHS after Brexit. There is concern over a lack of transparency and clarity over the data and how it is used. Phil Booth of medConfidential, campaigning for the privacy of health data, said: "Patients should know how their data is used. There should be no surprises. While legitimate research for public health benefit is to be encouraged, it must always be consensual, safe, and properly transparent. Do patients know – have they even been told by the one in seven GP practices across England that pass on their clinical details – that their medical histories are being sold to multinational pharma companies in the US and around the world?"

=== Smoking cessation ===
Smoking is the greatest cause of avoidable illness and death in England and costs the NHS £2.5 billion a year and the economy £11bn. Public Health England (PHE) states that one in four hospital patients smoke tobacco products, higher than the proportion in the general population, and smoking causes 96,000 deaths per year in England and twenty times the number of smoking-related illnesses. PHE wants hospitals to help smokers quit. Few patients who smoke are referred to a hospital or community-based cessation program. During their hospital stay, over a quarter of patients were not asked if they smoked and nearly three-quarters of smokers were not asked if they wanted to stop. PHE states smoking patients should be offered specialized help to stop nicotine replacement therapy. Frank Ryan, a psychologist said: "It's really about refocusing our efforts and motivating our service users and staff to quit. And of course, whatever investment we make in smoking cessation programs, there's a payback many times more in terms of the health benefits and even factors such as attendance at work, because it's workers who smoke [who] tend to have more absent spells from work." The numbers of smokers getting help to quit has fallen due to cuts in funding for smoking cessation care, though the National Institute for Health and Care Excellence recommends such help.

=== Check-ups ===
NHS Health Check is a prevention programme that invites adults without pre-existing health conditions, aged between 40 and 74 in England for a health check-up every five years to screen for key conditions including heart disease, diabetes, kidney disease, and stroke. Local authorities are responsible for the commissioning of the programme, with GPs being the most common provider, followed by community outreach and pharmacy providers.

=== Workplace inclusivity and anti-racism measures ===
Health Secretary Wes Streeting warned in 2025 of a “rising tide of racism” reminiscent of the 1970s and 1980s, noting that such attitudes were becoming “permissible again” and were affecting NHS staff and patients. According to the Royal College of Nursing (RCN), reports from nurses of racist incidents at work rose by 55% between 2022 and 2025. The RCN expects to receive more than 1,000 calls in 2025 from nurses seeking advice and support after experiencing racism, compared with almost 700 in 2022.

Alongside concerns about racism, the government commissioned an independent review into antisemitism within the NHS after reports that “clear cases were not dealt with adequately”. A report by the General Medical Council (GMC) indicated that Jewish doctors have experienced increased antisemitic abuse from colleagues since 7 October 2023, prompting calls for stronger protections and disciplinary processes.

NHS England subsequently issued a letter to all NHS trusts, signed by chief executive Sir Jim Mackey and chief workforce officer Jo Lenaghan, calling for renewed efforts to ensure workplaces where “staff and patients alike feel safe and welcome” and reaffirming a zero-tolerance stance on hatred, antisemitism, racism, and all discriminatory behaviour.

In 2024, some NHS hospitals required radiographers to ask all male patients aged 12 to 55 if they were pregnant for inclusivity purposes. This received significant coverage in the media.

== Public satisfaction and criticism ==
Public satisfaction with the National Health Service (NHS) in England has fluctuated over time. While the founding principles of the NHS continue to enjoy strong public support, overall satisfaction with the way the service is run has declined markedly in recent years.

According to the British Social Attitudes survey, analysed by the King's Fund and Nuffield Trust, overall satisfaction with the NHS in England fell to 24% in 2023, the lowest level recorded since the survey began in 1983, and declined further to 21% in 2024. Dissatisfaction rose to a record 59%, with most respondents citing long waiting times, staff shortages, and insufficient government funding as the main reasons for their views.

Support for the underlying principles of the NHS, however, remains strong. In 2023, 91% of respondents agreed the NHS should be free at the point of use, 82% said it should be available to everyone, and 82% supported funding it primarily through taxation.

Satisfaction levels vary by service. In 2024, 23% of respondents were satisfied with general practice services, 12% with accident and emergency (A&E) departments, and around 20% with NHS dentistry. Despite declining satisfaction with performance, the NHS continues to be regarded as an important symbol of national identity and pride.

Media coverage of the NHS often highlights pressures such as staff shortages, long waiting lists, and delays in emergency and dental care. Despite these challenges, public trust in healthcare professionals remains high: around three-quarters of people continue to view doctors, nurses and other NHS staff as reliable sources of information and care.

== Performance ==
In 2014 the Nuffield Trust and the Health Foundation produced a report comparing the performance of the NHS in the four countries of the UK since devolution in 1999. They included data for the North East of England as an area more similar to the devolved areas than the rest of England. They found that there was little evidence that any one country was moving ahead of the others consistently across the available indicators of performance. There have been improvements in all four countries in life expectancy and rates of mortality amenable to health care. Despite the hotly contested policy differences between the four countries, there was little evidence, where there was comparable data, of any significant differences in outcomes. The authors also complained about the increasingly limited set of comparable data on the four health systems of the UK. Medical school places are set to increase by 25% from 2018.

A report from Public Health England's Neurology Intelligence Network based on hospital outpatient data for 2012–13 showed that there was significant variation in access to services by clinical commissioning group. In some places, there was no access at all to consultant neurologists or nurses. The number of new consultant adult neurology outpatient appointments varied between 2,531 per 100,000 resident population in Camden to 165 per 100,000 in Doncaster.

=== Waiting lists and waiting times ===
The number of people waiting over 12 months for consultant-led elective (diagnosis, surgery or another treatment) care has fallen drastically from over 200,000 in the 2000s to under 2,000 in early 2019. However, between 2008 and 2018 the overall number of patients on the waiting list has risen from 2 million to 4 million.

The COVID-19 pandemic disrupted the delivery of healthcare by the NHS and there was a dramatic increase in the backlog of people waiting for treatment. In December 2022 over 7 million people were on a hospital waiting list in England, 1 in 8 English people. This was the largest number since the start of records. Among them more than 2 million had been waiting over 18 weeks and more than 400,000 over 12 months. 37,837 patients waited over 12 hours for hospital admission after it had been decided to admit them in November 2022, 255% more than in 2021 and 3,303% more than in November 2019.

In September 2024, there were around 6.3 million patients on the NHS waiting list in England. Among them over 3.1 million patients have been waiting over 18 weeks and almost 249,300 patients over 12 months. The biggest waiting list of more than 850,000 people are in line for trauma and orthopaedic diagnosis and care.

In February 2025, the waiting lists dropped from 6.28 million to 6.24 million, a fourth consecutive drop in waiting lists in as many months.

==== Proposals for improvement ====
Research has been conducted on potential approaches and activities that could reduce waiting lists and free up resources for the NHS. For example, in the case of multiple conditions, surgery is not necessarily the best option for everyone and might even result in worse outcomes than other, non-invasive treatments. Avoiding surgery when possible could free up staff time, operating theatres and other resources. Potential alternatives to surgery include a 'watch and wait' approach to see if gallstone surgery and radical prostate cancer treatments are necessary, opting for one-stage surgery instead of two-stage when replacing infected artificial hips, avoiding emergency surgery for acute gut conditions when possible (especially for older people with severe frailty), and using plaster casts instead of surgery to treat broken scaphoid bones.

=== Care mistakes ===
A 2024 report by the public research university Imperial College London said that the NHS spends £14.7 billion a year treating patients in England hurt by care mistakes.

== Climate change ==
Recognising the impact that climate change has on health, NHS England has proposed methods for climate adaptation and has committed to mitigating its own climate impact.

Increasing the climate resilience of the NHS is a crucial component of climate adaptation. Climate change, and associated extreme weather events, can significantly disrupt health service delivery and access to health facilities, in addition to increasing the burden of climate-related health conditions. Extreme heat events have already caused significant disruptions to British healthcare services. NHS England has proposed methods to assess the climate vulnerability and adaptation capacity of the UK's population, as well as monitor impacts of climate change on health and service delivery. These methods include early surveillance of environmental health data (e.g., occurrence and impacts of extreme weather events, air quality exposure) and incidence of climate-related conditions. They also recommend the Strategic Health Asset Planning and Evaluation (SHAPE) tool which health services can use to map out local climate risks, develop emergency responses, and community plans. Upgrading infrastructure, preparing the workforce, and protecting supply chains are also key components of health system adaptation and resilience. However, obstacles to health system adaptation and mitigation efforts include poor policy implementation, lack of political commitment, inadequate data, financial constraints, and challenges in integrating these changes into existing health care structures.

NHS England has committed to reaching net zero by 2045. The organisation is estimated to produce 25 megatonnes of carbon dioxide equivalents, approximately 4% of the UK's greenhouse gas emissions. To meet their net zero target, NHS England aims to optimise its estates and facilities, reduce emissions from travel and transport, for example by electrifying its transport fleet and promoting cycling and other modes of transport for staff, decarbonise their supply chain (e.g., employing the NHS Supplier Roadmap which requires suppliers to align with the NHS's net zero target and develop a decarbonisation plan), and use low-carbon medical equipment and pharmaceuticals where possible. For example, desflurane, an anaesthetic gas, has a global warming potential approximately 2,500 times greater than carbon dioxide. NHS Scotland has already fully ceased the use of desflurane.

== Mental health services ==
The NHS provides mental health services free of charge but normally requires a referral from a GP first. Services that do not need a referral include psychological therapies through the Improving Access to Psychological Therapies initiative, and treatment for those with drug and alcohol problems. The NHS also provides online services that help patients find the resources most relevant to their needs.

== See also ==
- Genomics England
- Health forecasting
- Healthcare in the United Kingdom
- List of NHS trusts in England
- NHS Credit Union
- School health and nutrition services
- NHS Volunteer Responders (England)
