= National Treatment Agency for Substance Misuse =

The National Treatment Agency for Substance Misuse was established in 2001 to improve the availability, capacity and effectiveness of drug treatment.

It was set up as a special health authority within the National Health Service and its role was to deliver the ambitions of the 1999 Drug Strategy, and its 2002 update, for a much-expanded drug treatment system with quicker access.

The agency itself did not provide treatment, but worked in partnership with local commissioners and treatment providers to improve the quality of services, promote evidence-based practice and improve the skills of the drug treatment workforce. It also monitored the performance of the drug treatment sector through the National Drug Treatment Monitoring System (NDTMS).

After reviewing all its arm’s-length bodies in July 2010, the government decided it would cease to exist as a statutory organization. Its key functions transferred to Public Health England on 1 April 2013.
