= Elsie Widdowson =

British nutritionist (1906–2000)

- Born: 21 October 1906; Wallington, Surrey
- Died: 14 June 2000 (aged 93)
- Education: Imperial College, London
- Medical career
- Profession: Chemist, dietitian
- Institutions: Courtauld Institute of Biochemistry; Medical Research Council; Dunn Nutritional Laboratory
- Sub-specialties: dietetics
- Research: vitamins
- Awards: Member of the Order of the Companions of Honour; Fellow of the Royal Society

Elsie Widdowson CH CBE FRS (21 October 1906 – 14 June 2000), was a British dietitian and nutritionist. Alongside her research partner, Dr. Robert McCance (pediatrician, physiologist, biochemist, and nutritionist), they were responsible for overseeing the government-mandated addition of vitamins to food and wartime rationing in Britain during World War II.

== Early life ==
Widdowson was born in Wallington, Surrey on 21 October 1906 to Rose Elphick and Harry Widdowson. Her father, Thomas Henry (known as Harry), was from Grantham in Lincolnshire and moved to Battersea as a grocer's assistant. Her father eventually owned a stationery business, whilst her mother Rose, originally from Dorking, worked as a dressmaker. Her younger sister Eva Crane trained as a nuclear physicist but became a world-renowned authority on bees. The entire family was a part of the Plymouth Brethren.

As a child, both Elsie and her sister lived in Dulwich, a small village in south London, England. They both attended Sydenham County Grammar School for Girls where there earned prizes and scholarships for their excellence in academia. During the 1920s and 1930s, professional opportunities for women, apart from nursing or teaching, were limited. For this reason, Widdowson decided to train as a chemist in order to develop skills that offered employment potential.

Widdowson became one of the first woman graduates of Imperial College of London after earning her Bachelor's degree in 1928 for chemistry. She continued her postgraduate work at Imperial College in the Department of Plant Physiology. developing methods for separating and measuring the fructose, glucose, sucrose, and hemicellulose of fruit. She would measure individual changes in the carbohydrates in fruit from the time it appeared on the tree to when it ripened. Once a fortnight, she took a train to Kentish apple orchard and picked apples, measuring their carbohydrate levels. In 1931, she received her PhD in chemistry from the Imperial College for her thesis on the carbohydrate content of apples. This work would go on to have international impact. She started work in the University’s department of plant physiology.

While her early studies were primarily plant-based, Widdowson was much more interested in the biochemistry of animals and humans. She did further research with Professor Charles Dodds at the Courtauld Institute of Biochemistry at Middlesex Hospital, on the metabolism of the kidneys, and also received a doctorate from the Courtauld Institute.

== Career - Widdowson and McCance ==
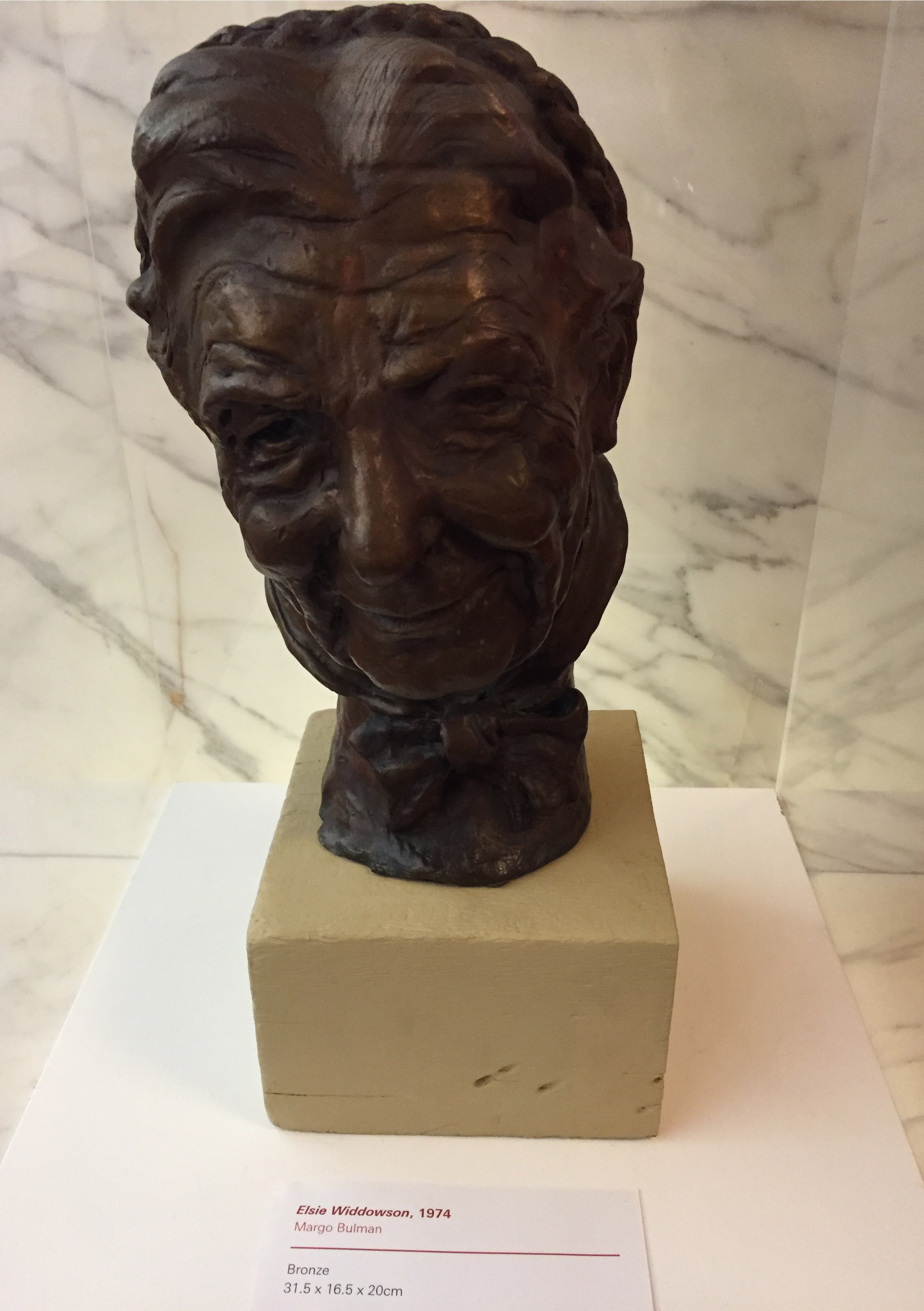
Bronze bust of Elsie Widdowson by Margo Bulman (1974), at the Royal Society, London.

Bust at Imperial College London

Widdowson struggled to find a long-term position despite obtaining a doctoral degree from a prestigious institution. Her research professor at the time, Dr. Dodds, suggested that Widdowson consider specializing in dietetics. It was then that she began her postgraduate degree at King's College, London. She learned about the compositions of meat and fish and how cooking affected them.

Widdowson met Robert McCance in the kitchens at King's College Hospital in 1933, when she was studying industrial cooking techniques as part of her diploma on dietetics. McCance was a junior doctor researching the chemical effects of cooking as part of his clinical research on the treatment of diabetes. Widdowson pointed out an error in McCance's analysis of the fructose content of fruit, based on her PhD research. Instead of being offended, McCance obtained a grant for Widdowson to analyze and correct all previous data. From there on they became scientific partners and worked together for the next 60 years, until McCance died in 1993. A few years after the first grant, McCance obtained a second grant for Widdowson to continue working on the food composition of fruits, vegetables, and nuts.

McCance became a Reader in Medicine at Cambridge University in 1938, and Widdowson joined his team at the Department of Experimental Medicine in Cambridge. They worked on the chemical composition of the human body, and on the nutritional value of different flours used to make bread. Widdowson also studied the impact of infant diet on human growth. They studied the differing effects from deficiencies of salt and of water, and produced the first tables to compare the different nutritional content of foods before and after cooking. Their work became of national importance during the Second World War. Widdowson and McCance were co-authors of The Chemical Composition of Foods, first published in 1940 by the Medical Research Council (MRC). Their book "McCance and Widdowson" became known as the dietician's bible and formed the basis for modern nutritional thinking.

As WWII progressed, the blockade on most food tightened. Essential foods such as butter, meat, cheese, fish, and eggs became very limited. Widdowson and McCance became concerned for the health effects such an extreme rationing system would cause. Widdowson and McCance and their colleagues became their own experimental subjects. The two would put themselves on a starvation diet, coupled with rigorous exercise such as climbing mountains and burning almost 5,000 calories (the healthy amount of calories to burn per day for a woman is about 2,500). Then, they would put themselves on their developed diet of bread, cabbage and potatoes for several months to find out if wartime rationing—with little meat, dairy or calcium intake—would affect their health. They showed that good health could be supported by this very restricted diet. They were also the first to advocate for the fortification of food, specifically bread, with vitamins and minerals such as calcium. Their work became the basis of the wartime austerity diet promoted by the Minister of Food Lord Woolton.

Widdowson and McCance headed the first mandated addition of vitamins and minerals to food. Their work began in the early 1940s, when calcium was added to bread. They were also responsible for formulating the wartime rationing of Britain during World War II.

Widdowson and McCance were employed by the Medical Research Council from 1946, and spent most of their working life in Cambridge. They were consulted on the rehabilitation of the victims of severe starvation in Nazi concentration camps, and visited the Netherlands, Germany and Denmark in early 1946 to study of the impact of the poor wartime diet on the people in Nazi-occupied territories. Widdowson followed up this work in the 1950s, 1960s and 1970s by studying malnourishment in Africa. Research on animals showed that malnourishment in early life led to lifelong effects on growth and health.

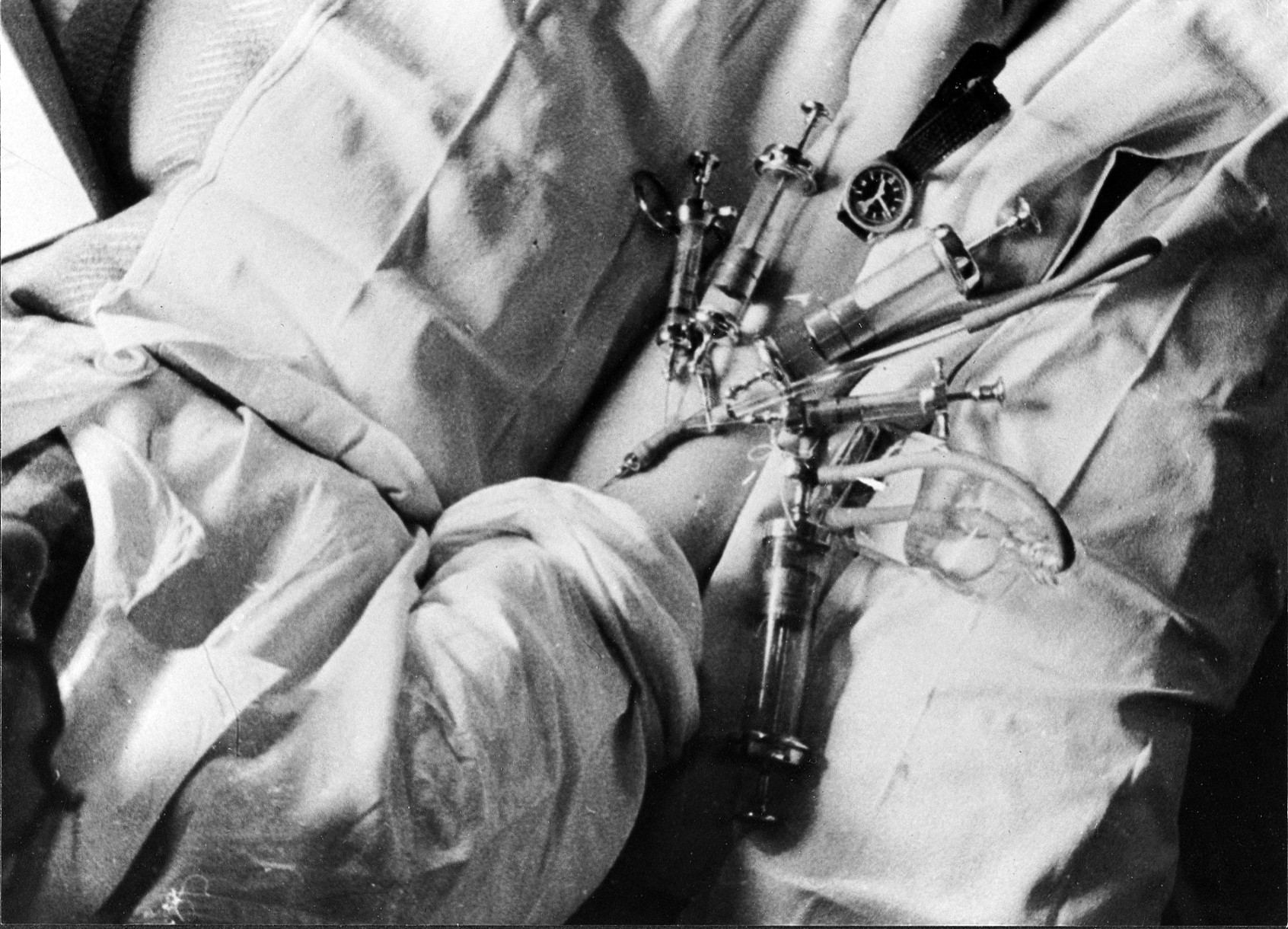
Injecting minerals into Dr. Widdowson's arm

Widdowson showed that a newborn human infant has 16 percent of its weight as fat, much greater than the one or two percent of other species. She also studied the importance of the nutritional content of infant diets, specifically, vitamins and minerals in natural and artificial human milk. Her work led to revised standards for breast milk substitutes in the UK in the 1980s.

== Later life and honors ==
Widdowson became head of the Infant Nutrition Research Division at the Dunn Nutritional Laboratory in Cambridge in 1966. She formally retired in 1972, but continued academic research in the Department of Investigative Medicine at Addenbrooke's Hospital. She was president of the Nutrition Society from 1977 to 1980, president of the Neonatal Society from 1978 to 1981, and president of the British Nutrition Foundation from 1986 to 1996. She became a Fellow of Imperial College in 1994.

She became a Fellow of the Royal Society in 1976 and was appointed a CBE in 1979. She was made a member of the Order of the Companions of Honour in 1993, which is awarded for outstanding achievements in the arts, literature, music, science, politics, industry, or religion.

The British Nutrition Foundation published a book in 1993 to celebrate 60 years of her partnership with McCance, McCance & Widdowson: A Scientific Partnership of 60 Years, 1933–1993.

Widdowson lived in Barrington near Cambridge for over 50 years. She ate a simple diet, including butter and eggs, and attributed her longevity to good genes: her father lived to 96 and her mother to 107. She died at Addenbrooke's Hospital after suffering a stroke while on holiday with her sister in Ireland. She never married.

== Legacy ==
In 2020, she was included by the BBC in a list of seven important but little-known British female scientists.

As part of the family-friendly policies, Imperial College offers the "Elsie Widdowson Fellowship" for academic staff returning to work following maternity, adoption and/or shared parental leave. This Fellowship aims to allow academic staff to focus fully on their research after returning to work and not put them at a disadvantage for prioritizing childcare.

In 2009 a Chemical Landmark Plaque was awarded at the Elsie Widdowson Laboratory on Fulbourn Road, Cambridge, former home of MRC Human Nutrition Research. The Chemical Landmark Plaque is the Royal Society of Chemistry's (RSC) national award recognizing a site of historic significance in science.

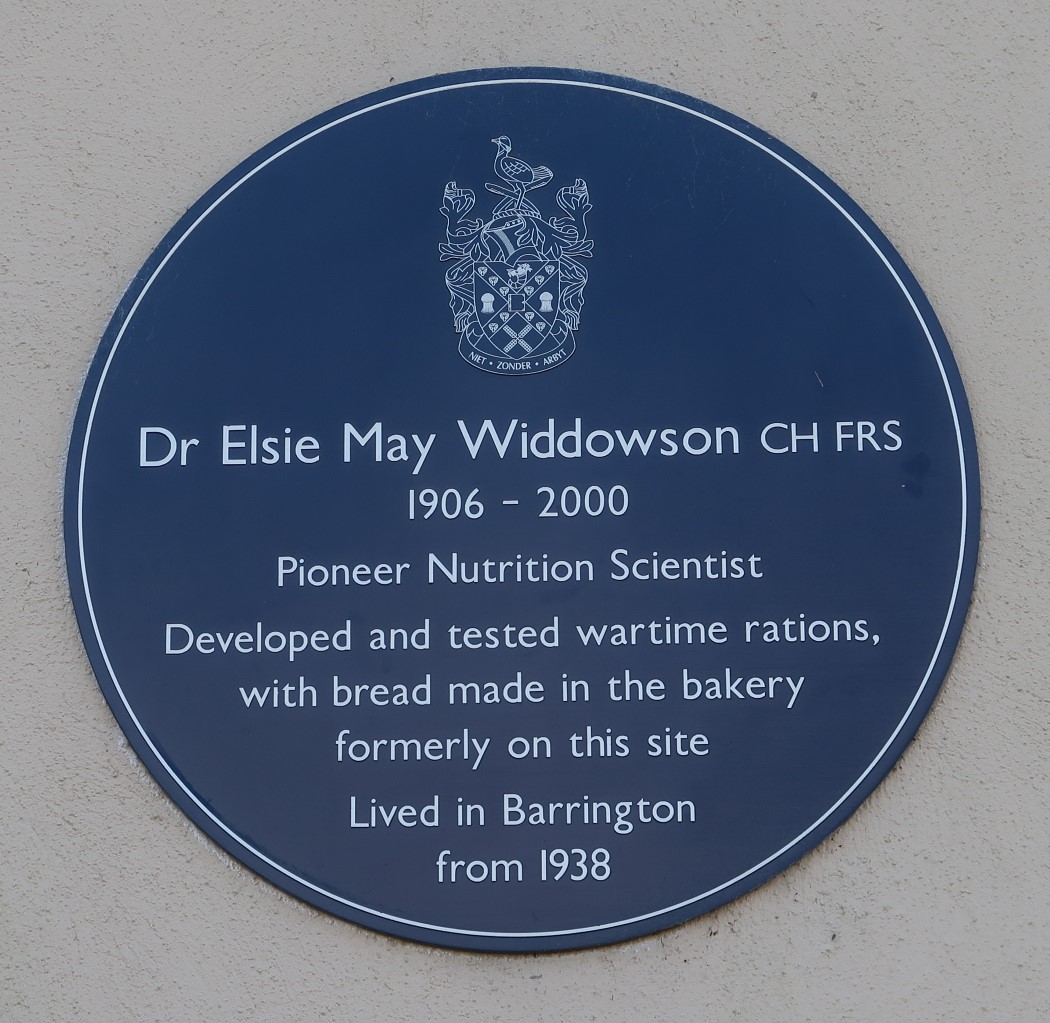
The plaque erected on the wall of the house adjoining the shop in Barrington, which used to be the village bakery and made the bread for Elsie’s studies.

In 2021 a blue plaque was unveiled in her honour at a former bakery near to her home in Barrington, where the bread which she had used for her studies had been made. It was funded by The Nutrition Society, the British Dietetic Association and the British Nutrition Foundation.

== Publications ==
- Fruit and Nuts: Supplement to the Composition of Foods.
  - Elsie M. Widdowson, Robert Alexander McCance, David H. Buss, et al. ISBN 0851863868
- Calorie Deficiencies and Protein Deficiencies
  - McCance, R. A., & Widdowson, E. M. (1966). Protein deficiencies and calorie deficiencies. Lancet, 2(7455), 158–159. https://doi.org/10.1016/s0140-6736(66)92439-1
- Feeding the newborn mammal
  - Widdowson, Elsie M. 1906. Burlington, N.C. : Scientific Publications Division, Carolina Biological Supply Co. ISBN 0892783125
- The Nutrition Society, 1941-1991: Presidents and Honorary Members - Their Stories and Recollections
  - Compiled by E. M. Widdowson. ISBN 0851987168
- The Composition of Foods
  - McCance, R.A, Widdowson, E.M. Royal Society of Chemistry; 7th edition (September 5, 2014). ISBN 1849736367

List of publications: https://www.goodreads.com/author/list/19752191.Elsie_Widdowson
