= Public Health England =

Executive agency in UK health system

Agency overview
- Formed: April 2013 (transitional: April 2012)
- Preceding agencies: Health Protection Agency; National Treatment Agency for Substance Misuse
- Dissolved: 1 October 2021
- Superseding agency: UK Health Security Agency, Department of Health and Social Care, Office for Health Improvement and Disparities, NHS England
- Jurisdiction: England
- Headquarters: Wellington House 133–155 Waterloo Road London SE1 8UG
- Employees: 6,749 (in 2021)
- Annual budget: £300 million
- Parent agency: Department of Health and Social Care
- Website: www.gov.uk/government/organisations/public-health-england

Public Health England (PHE) was an executive agency of the Department of Health and Social Care in England which began operating on 1 April 2013 to protect and improve health and wellbeing and reduce health inequalities. Its formation came as a result of the reorganisation of the National Health Service (NHS) in England outlined in the Health and Social Care Act 2012. It took on the role of the Health Protection Agency, the National Treatment Agency for Substance Misuse and a number of other health bodies. It was an executive agency of the Department of Health and Social Care, and a distinct delivery organisation with operational autonomy.

On 29 March 2021, the UK Government announced that PHE would be disbanded and that its public health functions would be transferred, in proposals to reform public health structures. From 1 October 2021, PHE's health protection functions were formally transferred into the UK Health Security Agency (UKHSA), while its health improvement functions were transferred to the Office for Health Improvement and Disparities (DHSC), NHS England, and NHS Digital.

== Establishment ==
Proposals for reorganising the National Health Service were published in the early months of the Cameron–Clegg coalition, in a July 2010 white paper from the Department of Health (under Andrew Lansley) titled "Equity and excellence: Liberating the NHS". This was followed by a more detailed paper "Healthy Lives, Healthy People: Our strategy for public health in England" in November.

The bill to implement the proposals was introduced to the House of Commons in January 2011, and was the subject of a report by the Health Select Committee in October. Responding to criticism, the government published "Healthy Lives, Healthy People: Update and way forward" in July. The Health and Social Care Act gained royal assent in March 2012, with all elements of the new system to be operative by April 2013.

The Act established Public Health England as an executive body accountable to the Secretary of State for Health. It took over public health activity from the department and from the regional strategic health authorities (which were abolished), and all activities of the Health Protection Agency, the National Treatment Agency for Substance Misuse, the Public Health Observatories, the cancer registries, the National Cancer Intelligence Network, and the UK National Screening Committee together with its screening programmes.

== Mission, funding and resources ==
The Department of Health and Social Care set out PHE's remit and priorities in a letter to its chief executive. The last of such letters, published in July 2021, included tasks to implement the transition to the UK Health Security Agency and the Office for Health Improvement and Disparities.

PHE's mission was "to protect and improve the nation's health and to address inequalities". It employed approximately 5,000 staff (full-time equivalent), who were mostly scientists, researchers and public health professionals. It announced plans to move its headquarters and 2,750 staff to Harlow on a former GlaxoSmithKline site in 2017.

PHE laboratories provided an extensive range of microbiological diagnostic tests.

The Secretary of State set the total budget for public health, and determined how it was allocated between PHE and local authorities.

=== Relationship with local authorities ===
The 2012 Act, which established PHE as a national body, also returned the responsibility for a range of community and public health services to local authorities. Each upper tier local authority was required to appoint a director of public health, an officer of the authority who was responsible for the authority's public health functions including responding to emergencies. As of 2020 there were 134 of these posts.

== 2020–2021 reorganisation ==
A reorganisation of public health protection in England was announced by the then Secretary of State for Health and Social Care, Matt Hancock, in August 2020. The move was in response to mistakes in decision making during the COVID-19 pandemic, including issues with the supply of personal protective equipment for healthcare workers, low community testing capabilities, and insufficient data resourcing.

Several health experts, including Jeremy Farrar, Director of the Wellcome Trust, criticised the move to abolish PHE during an ongoing pandemic, with Richard Murray, Chief Executive of The King's Fund, stating that PHE "appears to have been found guilty without a trial" and it is "unclear what problem government are hoping to solve". In response, Hancock said the move was needed to bring together disparate leadership to strengthen the UK's response to the pandemic, and that the change would not result in disruption.

PHE would be combined with NHS Test and Trace to form a National Institute for Health Protection, under a new leadership structure headed by Conservative peer Dido Harding as interim CEO. Her appointment was later found to be unlawful. Michael Brodie, current CEO of the NHS Business Services Authority, was appointed as interim PHE CEO, replacing Duncan Selbie. In March 2021, it was announced that the new agency would instead be called the UK Health Security Agency, commencing on 1 April and led by Jenny Harries (formerly a regional director at PHE and Deputy Chief Medical Officer for England).

The new UKHSA would focus on infectious disease control, particularly the ongoing COVID-19 pandemic. Options for PHE's other roles, such as preventing ill health and reducing health inequalities, were to be discussed, with the decision made in March 2021 that these functions would move to "new homes within the health system" including the creation of an Office for Health Protection within the Department for Health and Social Care. This was subsequently re-named the Office for Health Improvement and Disparities and launched 1 October 2021. A few PHE staff moved to NHS England/Improvement or to NHS Digital.

While it was originally announced that PHE would be wound up on 31 March 2021, the body continued to have a 'shadow existence' until 1 October 2021, to support the transition of responsibilities to its successor organisations. The PHE name and employment contracts remained until 1 October.

== Structure ==
PHE had the following public-facing divisions:

- Health protection:
  - Immunisation, hepatitis and blood safety department
  - Chemical, radioactive, and environmental hazards
    - Research
    - National Poisons Information Service
    - Services for those working with hazardous materials
    - Harm reduction in relation to polluted environments
    - Operations
  - Field epidemiology, including contact tracing
  - Contagious disease surveillance and control
  - Major incident response
- Health improvement:
  - Alcohol, drugs, tobacco and justice (including substance misuse treatment monitoring)
  - Health promotion (such as healthy diet or anti-smoking marketing)
  - Health screening programmes (such as cancer screening, STD checks, cardiovascular disease screening, etc.) – supervised by the UK National Screening Committee
  - Reducing health inequalities
  - Specialist healthcare commissioning (in relation to major incidents, etc.)
  - National Cancer Intelligence Network (and other networks)
- Knowledge and information
  - Disease registration
  - Research and development
- Operations:
  - Microbiology unit
    - Microbe production
    - Research
    - References
    - Specialist services
  - Regional units (South / Midlands / North / London)
    - Preparation and response against major incidents
    - Local centres (several centres per regional unit, except London)
      - Local health protection
      - Substance misuse treatment services support (over more than one centre)
      - Local specialist commissioning (in relation to major incidents, etc.) and advice

== Key people ==
Duncan Selbie was the chief executive of PHE from its formation until 2020; he was previously chief executive of Brighton and Sussex University Hospitals NHS Trust. In the reorganisation announced in August 2020, Michael Brodie was appointed as interim CEO. Brodie was finance director at PHE from its formation until 2019, when he became CEO of the NHS Business Services Authority.

Other senior personnel include:

- Yvonne Doyle, medical director and director of health protection from 2019, replacing Paul Cosford who became emeritus medical director until his death in 2021.
- Kevin Fenton, regional director for London.
- Jenny Harries was regional director for the South of England until her appointment as deputy chief medical officer for England in 2019.
- Anne Mackie, director of screening programmes.
- Professor John Newton, director of health improvement.
- Mary Ramsay, head of immunisation, hepatitis and blood safety.
- Alison Tedstone, nutritionist, director of diet, obesity and physical activity.

== Campaigns ==
PHE took over the responsibility for 'Be Clear on Cancer' campaigns after it was created in the Health and Social Care Act 2012. Campaigns have been run on lung cancer, bowel cancer, oesophago-gastric and kidney & bladder cancer.

PHE was also responsible for Change4Life and ACT FAST.

In January 2014 it launched a campaign against smoking called 'Health Harms' on television and billboards across England.

== COVID-19 ==
The bullet points setting out PHE's priorities for 2019/20 in the annual directive from the Department of Health and Social Care included coordination of the response to public health emergencies under a heading "Leaving the EU". In addition, an "integrated surveillance system" and "investigation and management of outbreaks of infectious diseases" were listed in an annex.

PHE carried out contact tracing in the early stages of the COVID-19 pandemic, but this ceased on 12 March 2020 in view of the wide spread of infection in the population.

From 19 March, consistent with the opinion of the Advisory Committee on Dangerous Pathogens, PHE no longer classified COVID-19 as a "high consequence infectious disease" (HCID). This reversed an interim recommendation made in January 2020, due to more information about the disease confirming low overall mortality rates, greater clinical awareness, and a specific and sensitive laboratory test, the availability of which continues to increase. The statement said "the need to have a national, coordinated response remains" and added "this is being met by the government's COVID-19 response". This meant cases of COVID-19 were no longer managed by HCID treatment centres only.

=== Mortality data ===
PHE began publishing a weekly COVID-19 epidemiology surveillance summary each Thursday from 23 April, combining community, primary care, secondary care, virology and mortality surveillance data to support national and regional planning in relation to the pandemic. From 29 April, PHE collated daily reporting of the number of deaths of people in England with a positive COVID-19 test; the numbers published each day by the UK government had previously only counted deaths in hospital.

By July, as the number of deaths continued to fall, PHE reported significantly more deaths than those collated weekly by the Office for National Statistics from death certificates. Concerns were raised – by the Centre for Evidence-Based Medicine and others – that PHE's figures were over-estimates, since they included anyone who had a positive COVID-19 test, no matter how long ago. On 12 August it was agreed to publish the numbers of deaths within 28 days of a positive test, as was already done by other UK administrations. The cumulative total was recalculated as 41,329, a 12% decrease. John Newton, a PHE director, wrote that the method established in April was designed to avoid undercounting, and that PHE always intended to review the approach as the pandemic progressed.

=== Handling of test results ===
On 2 October 2020, it was realised that almost 16,000 COVID-19 test results received by PHE from commercial laboratories since 25 September had not been loaded into dashboards or passed to the outsourced Test and Trace operation (notifications of test results to individuals were not affected). PHE retrieved the missing results after determining that the cause was ill-thought-out use of Microsoft's Excel software. Matt Hancock, Health Secretary, said in Parliament that the error "should never have happened". The following month, economists at the University of Warwick estimated that the delayed contact tracing led to more than 125,000 additional infections and 1,500 deaths, although PHE disputed their findings.

== Criticism and other published comment ==
Public Health England has been criticised for downplaying mental health within its overall resourcing and agenda; in 2011 the Royal College of Psychiatrists, commenting on the plan to create PHE, stated its concern that there appeared to be "few, or no, commitments or resources within either the Department of Health or Public Health England to take the public mental health agenda forward".

The agency was criticised by Professor Martin McKee in January 2014. He said that continuing health inequalities among London boroughs were a scandal, and claimed coalition reforms had left it unclear who was supposed to analyse health data and tackle the problems highlighted.

The agency was criticised by The Lancet for allegedly using weak evidence in a review of electronic cigarettes to endorse an estimate that e-cigarette use is 95% less hazardous than smoking: "it is on this extraordinarily flimsy foundation that PHE based the major conclusion and message of its report" ... this "raises serious questions not only about the conclusions of the PHE report, but also about the quality of the agency's peer review process." Authors of the PHE report subsequently published a document clarifying that their endorsement of the 95% claim did not stand on the single study criticised in The Lancet, but on their broad review of toxicological evidence. The agency has also been criticised for "serious questions about transparency and conflicts of interest" regarding this review, that PHE's response "did not even begin to address the various relationships and funding connections" in question, and that this "adds to questions about the credibility of the organisation's advice". Scientific evidence accumulated since has cast further doubt on PHE's claim.

A 2017 question in the House of Lords revealed that a position underpinning UK Government policy, namely "that well run and regulated modern municipal waste incinerators are not a significant risk to public health remains valid", was asserted in advance of the results having been obtained from a study commissioned by Public Health England to answer the question whether municipal waste incinerators did, in fact, constitute a significant risk to public health.

== See also ==
- Health in the United Kingdom
- List of national public health agencies
