= NHS Volunteer Responders =

British volunteer organisation

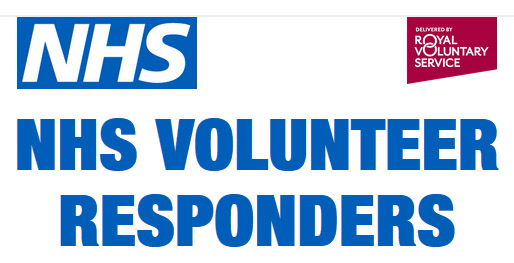
NHS and RVS Volunteer Responders logo

== Introduction ==
In 2020, the United Kingdom was suffering from the Coronavirus/Covid-19 pandemic and as a result the British Government and its departments were under strain. The National Health Service (NHS) joined forces with the Royal Voluntary Service to create additional, organised personnel . This would operate in England only. Other schemes were available in other parts of Great Britain.

== Volunteer Responders ==
The idea came to create Volunteer Responders, who were members of the public who would give up their spare time to support the health and public services.

== Mission & Types of Volunteer ==
Community Response volunteer: This role involves collecting shopping, medication or other essential supplies for someone who is self-isolating, and delivering these supplies to their home.

Patient Transport volunteer: This role supports the NHS by providing transport to patients who are medically fit for discharge, and ensuring that they are settled safely back in to their home.

NHS Transport volunteer: This role involves transporting equipment, supplies and/or medication between NHS services and sites, it may also involve assisting pharmacies with medication delivery.

Check-in and Chat volunteer: This role provides short-term telephone support to individuals who are at risk of loneliness as a consequence of self-isolation.

In short, the mission of the volunteers was:

- delivering medicines from pharmacies;
- carrying out shopping for isolating households;
- driving patients to appointments;
- bringing them home from hospital;
- or making regular phone calls to check on people isolating at home.

== Responses ==
Volunteer Responders would use their own transport to provide the above services. Volunteers would not receive any formal training nor equipment, but would receive a welcome pack (specific to the role they would be undertaking) and link for a mobile application (app).

The idea then was for volunteers to acquaint themselves with their responsibilities and use the GoodSAM app to dispatch themselves to calls for service.

Volunteers would have an interactive, online map on their app and could see both other volunteers (denoted by green men) and calls for service in their area (denoted by a red man with bandaged head [as the app was originally developed for medical professionals to respond to cardiac arrests locally]).

A siren would sound, as an alert, from then a volunteer could choose to respond or not.

== Payment ==
Volunteers would not receive any payment or major expenses, although fuel could be claimed back.
