= UK National Screening Committee =

The UK National Screening Committee co-ordinates the screening of people for medical conditions within the United Kingdom. The committee advises ministers and the National Health Service in all four countries of the UK, and is accountable to the four Chief Medical Officers.

== History ==
The UK National Screening Committee was established in 1996, with Sir Kenneth Calman (Chief Medical Officer for England 1991–1998) as its first chairman. Professor Sir Mike Richards (an oncologist, formerly National Cancer Director and Chief Inspector of Hospitals) has held the post since April 2022.

The committee maintains a list of policies in relation to various types of screening, and attempts to balance the risks against the benefits in each case. Some policies state that screening should be provided for everyone or some people, others that screening is not recommended. Each year it publishes a report reviewing its work.

In November 2013, the committee were involved in the testing of a new non-invasive prenatal blood test for Down Syndrome at Great Ormond Street Hospital for Children. According to the BioEdge website: "Invasive screening methods, either amniocentesis or chorionic villus sampling, result in a miscarriage in 1 out of every 100 tests. An estimated 90% of women who learn that their child has Down's syndrome choose to have an abortion. The outcome of the test will not be healthier children with the syndrome, but fewer."

In March 2026, the committee recommended a targeted programme of prostate cancer screening (rather than mass screening for the male population in general). The targeted group is limited to "men aged 45 to 61 who have a pathogenic (able to cause disease) BRCA2 variant and a family history of breast, ovarian, pancreatic, or prostate cancer", for whom tests should be undertaken every two years.

== Leaders ==
- Sir Kenneth Calman – 1996 to 1998
- Henrietta Campbell (Chief Medical Officer for Northern Ireland) – 1998 to 2006
- Dr Harry Burns (Chief Medical Officer, Scottish Government) – 2006 to 2013
- Professor David Walker (deputy Chief Medical Officer for England, PHE regional director) – 2013 to 2016
- Professor Bob Steele – 2016 to April 2022
- Professor Sir Mike Richards – since April 2022

== See also ==
- NHS Health Check
