= Office for Health Improvement and Disparities =

British government health agency

Agency overview
- Preceding agency: Public Health England
- Jurisdiction: England
- Ministers responsible: Ashley Dalton; Parliamentary Under-Secretary of State for Public Health and Prevention
- Agency executives: Professor Chris Whitty, Chief Medical Officer for England; Dr Jeanelle de Gruchy, Deputy Chief Medical Officer for England; Jonathan Marron, Director General
- Parent agency: Department of Health and Social Care
- Website: https://www.gov.uk/government/organisations/office-for-health-improvement-and-disparities

The Office for Health Improvement and Disparities (OHID) is a government unit within the Department of Health and Social Care that leads national efforts to improve public health policy across England.

The body is a successor organisation to Public Health England, and is responsible for health improvement and public health functions along with NHS England, as outlined in correspondence on the location of Public Health England functions from 1 October 2021. The Office focuses on reducing the burdens of preventable illness and disease, and of health inequalities, on society and the healthcare system. It explores how incentives and rewards can encourage healthier behaviour, with an explicit focus on the work of the Health Promotion Board in Singapore.

The OHID became fully operational on 1 October 2021.

== See also ==
- Health in England
- Health in the United Kingdom
- List of national public health agencies
- UK Health Security Agency
- Public Health England
- Public Health Scotland
- Public Health Wales
- Public Health Agency (Northern Ireland)
