= National Cancer Research Institute =

UK research association

The National Cancer Research Institute (NCRI) was a UK-wide partnership between cancer research funders, which promoted collaboration in cancer research between 2001 and 2023. Its member organisations worked together to maximize the value and benefit of cancer research for the benefit of patients and the public. Rather than replace or duplicate any of the functions of its members, it seeks to add value through joint planning, coordination and collaboration.

== History ==
In May 1999, the UK Prime Minister held a Downing Street Cancer Summit which led to the formation of the Cancer Research Funders Forum, bringing together the main government and charitable agencies that fund cancer research in the UK for the first time.

Ian Gibson MP, a former cancer researcher from the University of East Anglia, called for the creation of a UK National Cancer Institute in November 1998, modelled on the National Cancer Institute in the USA. He used his influence as a member of the Science and Technology Committee of the British House of Commons to promote the idea and, in early 2000 the committee held an inquiry into the funding of cancer research in the UK which reported in July 2000, recommending "the creation of a new National Cancer Research Institute to set national research priorities and to co-ordinate and fund cancer research in the UK."

Soon afterwards, in September 2000, the Department of Health published their first NHS Cancer Plan which announced that the Department would work with the Cancer Research Funders Forum to create a National Cancer Research Institute which would take a more proactive role in the strategic co-ordination of cancer research.

The NCRI was formally launched on 1 April 2001.

In June 2023, the NCRI began "winding down", citing "uncertainty in the wider economic and research environment" and "questions around the sustainability of NCRI’s operating and funding model". The British Medical Journal noted that some partner organisations had been struggling to maintain their research funding levels in the wake of the COVID-19 pandemic in the United Kingdom, which had reduced charity fundraising income, and Brexit, which had led to reprioritisation of UK government research funding.

== Activities ==
Activities of the NCRI included:

- maintaining a database of cancer research in the UK, which formed part of the International Cancer Research Portfolio (a database of publicly funded US and UK cancer research). The database was updated annually and analyses of the UK data were published every few years.
- organising the annual NCRI Cancer Conference, the largest cancer research conference in the UK at the time.
- developing a plan to network UK cancer registries and to encourage epidemiological research.
- setting up an initiative to revitalise UK radiotherapy research by networking and supporting individuals and groups, developing infrastructure and an integrated strategy.
- a strategic role in the development and oversight of the National Cancer Research Network to provide the infrastructure necessary to improve the speed, quality and integration of clinical trials in the UK.
- setting up a network of experimental cancer medicine centres to ensure that discoveries in basic science are translated into potential new cancer treatments as rapidly as possible.
- publishing reports on several key areas of cancer research, including prostate cancer, lung cancer, radiotherapy, palliative care and prevention, many of which have led onto the establishment of specific initiatives to fund aspects of research in these fields where a strategic gap was identified.
- establishing the National Cancer Intelligence Network

The NCRI was a leader in the introduction of patient/public involvement in clinical research. The NCRI Consumer Liaison Group was founded in 2000 and administered by the National Cancer Research Network (NCRN). In the NCRI's early years the chair of the Consumer Liaison Group was an NCRI board member ex-officio. Since 2007, two patient/public board appointments were made following open advertisement.

== Member organisations ==
- Biotechnology and Biological Sciences Research Council
- Bloodwise
- Brain Tumour Research
- Breast Cancer Now
- Cancer Research UK
- Chief Scientist Office (Scotland)
- Children With Cancer UK
- Department of Health, Welsh Government
- Health and Care Research Wales
- Research and Development division, Health and Social Care (Northern Ireland)
- Macmillan Cancer Support
- Marie Curie
- Medical Research Council
- Pancreatic Cancer Research Fund
- Prostate Cancer UK
- Tenovus Cancer Care
- Wellcome Trust

== See also ==
- Cancer in the United Kingdom

== Sources ==
- Waxman and Gibson - Britain needs a national cancer institute, British Medical Journal 1998 317: 1397
- Department of Health website: Research Priority Areas - Cancer (http://www.dh.gov.uk/PolicyAndGuidance/ResearchAndDevelopment/ResearchPriorityAreas/ResearchPriorityAreasArticle/fs/en?CONTENT_ID=4032197&chk=pfB%2Bi6) accessed 27 Oct 2006.
- NCRI website (http://www.ncri.org.uk) accessed 27 Oct 2006
