= National Cancer Intelligence Network =

National Cancer Intelligence Network part of Public Health England
Agency overview
- Formed: 2008
- Superseding agency: none
- Jurisdiction: United Kingdom
- Headquarters: Wellington House, London, SE1
- Employees: 50
- Agency executive: Chris Carrigan, Director of the National Cancer Intelligence Network (NCIN) and Information Services at Public Health
- Parent agency: Public Health England
- Website: www.gov.uk/government/organisations/public-health-england

The National Cancer Intelligence Network (NCIN), was set up in 2008 to drive improvements in care standards and clinical outcomes. NCIN is now part of Public Health England, following the Health and Social Care Act 2012.

== About NCIN ==
NCIN coordinates the collection, analysis and publication of comparative national information on diagnosis, treatment and outcomes for many types of cancers, in a way which is useful to patients, commissioners and service providers and other interested parties.

Sitting within Public Health England (PHE), the NCIN is a UK organisation that attempts to work closely with cancer services in England, Scotland, Wales and Northern Ireland but the majority of the reports are at an England level only.

It brings together information from national NHS cancer organisations, cancer registries, health service researchers and a range of other interested parties (including the Office for National Statistics; National Clinical Audit Support Programme; and NHS Digital (previously the Health and Social Care Information Centre).

To ensure that data and analysis produced by NCIN is used to improve clinical care, NCIN set up 12 site specific clinical reference groups (SSCRGs).These groups ensure that the interpretation of NCIN is relevant to clinicians and can be used by the clinical community to improve outcomes.

== Members of the National Cancer Intelligence Network ==
=== Funding Organisations ===
- Department of Health
- Cancer Research UK
- Macmillan Cancer Support
- Medical Research Council
- National Cancer Research Network

=== Regional and Specialist Cancer Registries ===
- National Cancer Registration Service (NCRS)
- National Registry of Childhood Tumours
- Northern Ireland Cancer Registry
- Scottish Cancer Registry
- Welsh Cancer Intelligence and Surveillance Unit

=== Statistical and Analytical Partners ===
- Cancer Research UK Statistical Information Team
- London School of Hygiene and Tropical Medicine Cancer Research UK Cancer Survival Group
- National Clinical Analysis and Specialised Applications Team
- Health and Social Care Information Centre
- Office for National Statistics
- UK and Ireland Association of Cancer Registry (UKIACR)

=== Other partners ===
- National End of Life Care Intelligence Network
- Breakthrough Breast Cancer
- National Institute for Health and Care Research (NIHR) Research Capability Programme
- NHS Cancer Screening Programmes
- NHS Improvement
- Pharmaceutical Oncology Initiative

== See also ==
- Cancer in the United Kingdom
