= MRC Human Nutrition Research =

Research Institute in the UK

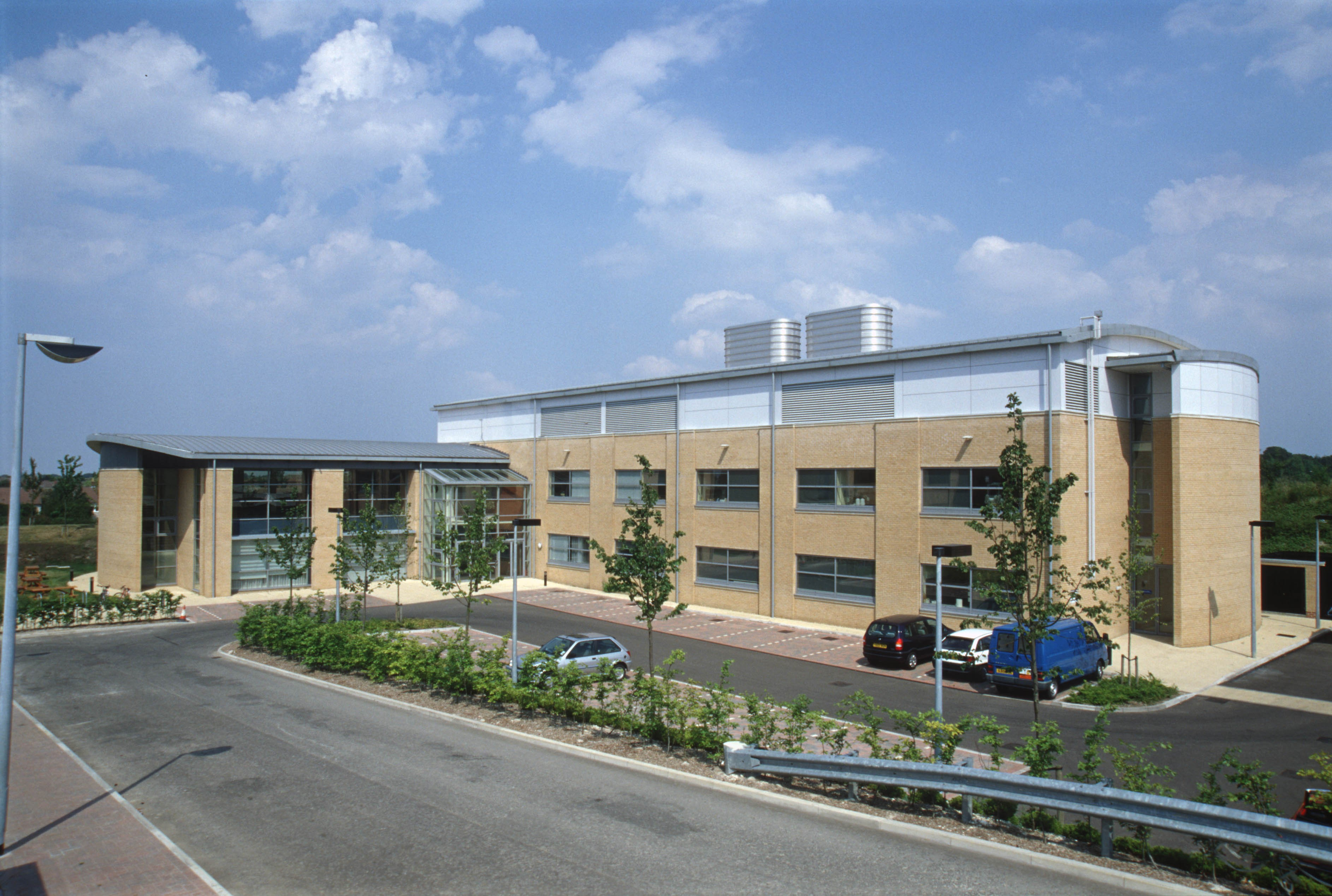
- Abbreviation: HNR
- Formation: 1998
- Dissolved: 2018
- Type: Research institute
- Legal status: Government agency
- Purpose: Human nutrition research in the UK
- Headquarters: Elsie Widdowson Laboratory
- Location: 120 Fulbourn Road, Cherry Hinton, Cambridge, CB1 9NL
- Coordinates: 52°10′57″N 0°10′51″E
- Region served: UK
- Director: Dr Ann Prentice
- Parent organization: Medical Research Council
- Affiliations: School of Clinical Medicine, University of Cambridge, Food Standards Agency
- Staff: c. 100 nutrition scientists
- Website: HNR

MRC Human Nutrition Research was the largest research institute in the UK for human nutrition, and was based in Cambridge.

== History ==
In 1998 MRC Human Nutrition Research (HNR) was formed as a result of the restructuring of the Dunn Human Nutrition Unit following the resignation of Professor Roger Whitehead. The Medical Research Council (MRC), founded in 1913, had previously had a Human Nutrition Research Unit at the end of the Second World War; this was founded and directed by BS Platt, and was interested in serious nutritional deficiencies in children, that would cause significantly premature death. HNR was formed in order to continue to advance the MRC's portfolio of strategic and applied nutrition research. In 2016, following restructuring and refocusing of its research interests HNR was renamed MRC Elsie Widdowson Laboratory (MRC EWL).

In December 2018 MRC EWL closed.

== Mission ==
The mission of HNR was to conduct nutrition research and surveillance to improve the health of the population with a focus on obesity and metabolic risk, musculoskeletal health, intestinal health and nutritional inequalities.

== Objectives ==
HNR's four objectives were to:

- Advance knowledge through discovery science, the development of innovative methodologies and the application of specialist expertise in priority areas
- Improve health and economic advantage through the exchange of knowledge and technology to inform nutrition policy and practice
- Provide opportunities for training and to build capacity for nutrition research
- Foster a dialogue with the public on nutrition science and its implications for health

== Structure ==
HNR was based at Peterhouse Technology Park, in south-east Cambridge, on the South Cambridgeshire-Cambridge boundary, round the corner from Fulbourn Hospital. ARM Holdings have their headquarters on the same site.

It was divided into three main research departments and a support department:

- Cellular and Molecular Sciences
- Nutritional Physiology & Biomarkers
- Diet and Population Health
- Scientific Operations & Logistics

These departments housed research groups concerned with:

- Maternal & Child Nutrition
- National Nutrition Surveys
- Nutrition & Bone Health
- Nutritional Interventions
- Obesity & Related Metabolic Disorders
- Nutrition Communications and Translation into Policy & Practice
- Nutrition Epidemiology
- Biomineral Research
- Lipid Profiling and Signalling
- Physiological Modelling of Metabolic Risk
- Dietary Assessment

HNR also had a library which housed an important collection of historically significant research documents.

== Function ==
HNR conducted nutrition research and surveillance to improve the health of the population with a focus on obesity and metabolic risk, musculoskeletal health, intestinal health and nutritional inequalities.

=== Research ===
In November 1999 HNR scientists discovered that children in the early 1950s, despite food rationing, had healthier diets than children today. They had a greater intake of calcium, from drinking more milk, and of iron, as they ate more red meat than poultry and iron containing dark green vegetables such as broccoli and kale. In the early 1950s, no children would have eaten pasta, but 50% of children in the 1990s did. However children in the 1950s were faced with more incurable illnesses, prevented today by vaccination.

In September 2002, HNR scientists proved a link between diabetes and being overweight. They found that people who had lost 9 lb in weight had reduced the chances of having diabetes by 58%.

In 2007, a study was conducted to research the effect of negative weight stigmas on patients. The conclusion was that in several cases, the belief in the negative weight stigmas led to overeating and bad health habits in patients who were studies. More details can be found in the official report listed under references.

HNR participated in the National Diet and Nutrition Survey and the MRC's National Survey of Health and Development, which showed insights such as approximately five per cent of the UK's population are vegetarian.

== See also ==
- Obesity in the United Kingdom
