= Association for Nutrition =

- Abbreviation: AfN
- Purpose: The regulation of nutrition professionals and quality assurance of Nutrition training
- Region served: United Kingdom
- Chief Executive: Helen Clark
- Website: www.associationfornutrition.org

The Association for Nutrition (AfN) is the voluntary regulator for nutritionists and nutrition scientists in the United Kingdom.

The association is a registered charity and is a custodian of the United Kingdom Voluntary Register of Nutritionists (UKVRN)

Its purpose is to "protect and benefit the public by defining and advancing standards of evidence-based practice across the field of nutrition and at all levels within the workforce".

The Association for Nutrition and the UKVRN are acknowledged by Public Health England, NHS Careers, NHS Choices and the National Careers Service as the professional body for nutritionists in the UK.

The association's Chief Executive is Helen Clark.

== The register ==
All registrants on the UKVRN have had to provide evidence of their training and professional nutrition experience. They have also committed to abide by a standard of ethics, conduct, and performance. There are three categories of UKVRN registrants: Registered Nutritionist (RNutr) with nutrition in public health, nutrition science, sport & exercise, food or animal nutrition, Registered Associate Nutritionist (ANutr) and Fellow of AfN (FAfN).

=== Registered Associate Nutritionists ===
Registered Associate Nutritionists (post-nominals: ANutr) are recent graduates, who have been able to demonstrate a sound foundation of knowledge and understanding in nutrition science, and are working towards gaining sufficient experience within a specialist area to become a Registered Nutritionist (RNutr).

=== Registered Nutritionists ===
Registered Nutritionists (post nominals RNutr) have been assessed as having demonstrated that they have met rigorously applied knowledge, understanding and practice core competencies set by the AfN. They commit to keeping their knowledge up to date and ensuring they follow evidence-based practice.

=== Fellows of the Association for Nutrition ===
Fellows (FAfN) have been Registered Nutritionists (RNutr) for at least five years and have been recognized by their peers as have made a significant and sustained contribution to the advancement of nutrition practice, research or education at a national or international level.
