= Shenyang Medical College =

Medical school in Shenyang, China

Shenyang Medical College (Chinese: 沈阳医学院; pinyin: Shěnyáng Yīxué Yuàn) is a medical college based in Shenyang, Liaoning Province, China. It was formerly known as Shenyang Municipal Advanced Practice Nurse School, Shenyang Advanced Medical School, becoming the Shenyang Medical College in 1987.

== History ==
The school was founded in 1949 as the Shenyang Municipal Advanced Practice Nurse School. It was renamed to Shenyang Advanced Medical School in 1949, following the provincial administration management of the college. It was later renamed again, to become the Shenyang Medical College in 1987.

In 2004 the college began admitting international students.

== Faculty ==
Shenyang Medical College has a staff of 3,389 people, including the staff of affiliated hospitals. 631 staff members are full-time teachers, 73 are professors, 97 are associate professors; 49 are doctors, and 205 are masters.
