= NHS Credit Union =

- Founded: 2009 (1998)
- Type: Industrial and Provident Society
- Location: 9 Dava Street, Pavilion 3B, Moorpark Court, Glasgow G51 2JA
- Website: nhscreditunion.com

NHS (Scotland and North England) Credit Union Limited is a not-for-profit member-owned financial co-operative, based in Glasgow and operating throughout Scotland and the north of England. It has 9,100 members and manages over £12m in savings.

== History ==
The credit union was formed as Glasgow NHS Employees Credit Union in 1998, on the initiative of the UNISON Southern General Hospital Branch Secretary, with the support of the then Greater Glasgow Health Board. It became West of Scotland NHS Employees Credit Union in 2003, before adopting the present name in 2009. NHS Credit Union is a registered trading name of NHS (Scotland and North England) Credit Union.

In 2015, the credit union was awarded a grant of £100,000 by the Lloyds Banking Group Credit Union Development Fund to increase its capital asset ratio to support growth in both membership and assets.

== Activities ==
Membership of NHS Credit Union is currently restricted by common bond to NHS employees in Scotland and the North of England (North East, North West and Yorkshire & Humberside regions) and their families living at the same address.

A member of the Association of British Credit Unions, registered under the Industrial and Provident Societies Acts, NHS Credit Union is authorised by the Prudential Regulation Authority and regulated by the Financial Conduct Authority and PRA. Ultimately, like the banks and building societies, members’ savings are protected against business failure by the Financial Services Compensation Scheme.

== See also ==
- Credit unions in the United Kingdom
- National Health Service
- British co-operative movement
