= Nutritionist =

Person whose research area is nutrition

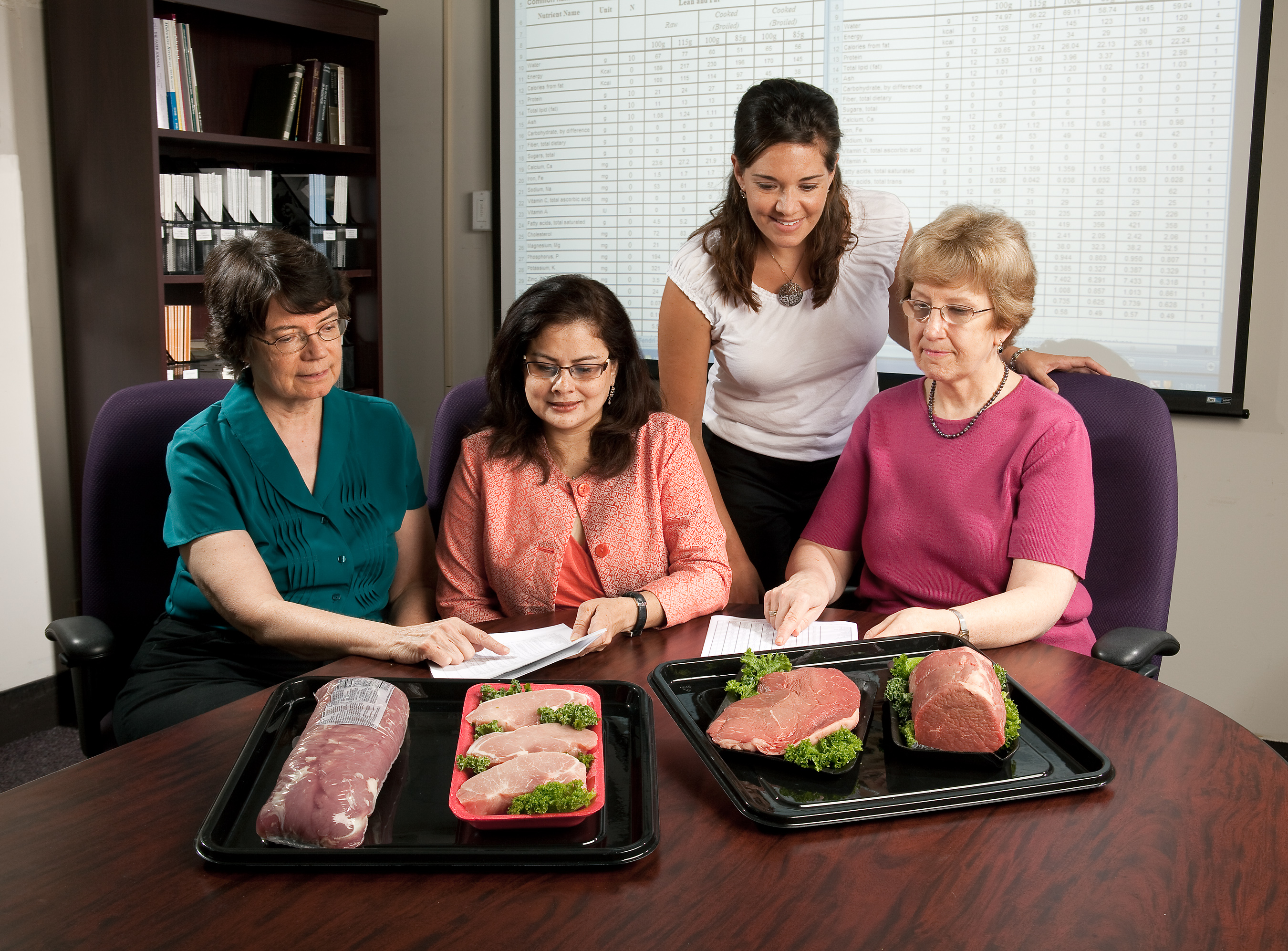
Agricultural Research Service Nutrient Data Laboratory scientists review the revised USDA nutrient data sets for fresh pork and beef.

A nutritionist is a person who advises others on matters of food and nutrition and their impacts on health. Some people specialize in particular areas, such as sports nutrition, public health, or animal nutrition, among other disciplines. In many jurisdictions, a person can claim to be a nutritionist even without any training, education, or professional license, in contrast to a dietitian, who has a university degree, professional license, and certification for professional practice.

== Regulation of the title "nutritionist" ==
The professional practice of being a dietitian is different from a nutritionist. In many countries and jurisdictions, the title nutritionist is not subject to statutory professional regulation; thus, any person may self-title as a nutritionist or nutrition expert, even if self-taught and professionally uncertified. In the United Kingdom, Australia, parts of Canada, and most US states, a person self-titled as a nutritionist is not legally defined, whereas a dietitian is professionally certified and registered. People who have current registration with the appropriate regulatory body usually refer to themselves as Registered dietitians, and so may use the professional designation, "RD" or "RDN".

The term nutritionist may refer to a range of trained or untrained individuals – from someone who has no qualifications in nutrition to someone with a PhD in nutrition science. Within the professional field of nutrition, there is also the field of nutrition therapy which may be associated with practitioners of alternative medicine. Prominent examples include Gillian McKeith, Patrick Holford and Robert O. Young. A potential problem with self-proclaimed and media nutritionists, is low levels of training, the selling of supplements and herbal remedies and the use or promotion of concepts that are untested or potentially even dangerous, such as exclusion of food groups, detox and fad diets.

=== Brazil ===
To obtain the Nutritionist title, one must have studied at a recognized university for four years plus a year of practice (internship). The nutritionists are registered at the Conselho Regional de Nutrição (Regional Council of Nutrition). A Nutritionist can prescribe diets, work at hospitals with clinical intervention, or in the food production segment.

=== Canada ===
There is variation across the country, with different provinces having different regulations. The title "nutritionist" is protected by provincial law in Quebec and Nova Scotia. The term "Registered Nutritionist" or "Nutritionist" is protected in Alberta. The term “Registered Dietitian/Nutritionist” is protected by law in New Brunswick.

For example, the Nova Scotia Dietetic Association is the regulatory body for professional dietitians and nutritionists in that province, authorized by legislation, the Professional Dietitians Act, "to engage in registration, quality assurance, and when necessary, the discipline of dietitians in Nova Scotia to ensure safe, ethical and competent dietetic practice." Professional requirements include a bachelor's degree in Dietetics/Nutrition from an accredited university, a program of practical training, and successful completion of a registration examination (the "Canadian Dietetic Registration Examination" or CDRE).

=== Hong Kong ===
Qualified Nutritionist; Any person who is the holder of a degree in dietetics, foods, and nutrition awarded by a university or other institution recognised by the Association. Qualified Dietitian: Any person who is currently holder of a degree or a postgraduate diploma in dietetics recognized by the Council for Professions Supplementary to Medicine (Dietitian Board), the American Dietetic Association, Dietitians of Canada, British Dietetic Association and Dietitians Australia, for full membership or equivalent.

=== Morocco ===
In Morocco, "Nutritionist" is a protected title and might refer to a researcher in the field of nutrition or to a person who practices therapeutic nutrition. To hold the title of Nutritionist, a person should have carried doctoral studies in the field of nutrition and obtained a Ph.D. degree. On the other hand, the title of "Dietitian" is given to whoever carries out studies in nutrition schools for three years and obtains a B.Sc. However, unlike Nutritionists, Dietitians are not given authorization to open private offices and to practice.

=== South Africa ===
In South Africa, nutritionists must be registered with the Health Professions Council of South Africa. The Council regulates the professional titles of "Nutritionist", "Student Nutritionist", and "Supplementary Nutritionist", along with "Dietitian", "Student Dietitian", and Supplementary Dietitian". Requirements for eligibility for registration include a recognized bachelor's degree from an accredited educational institution. The undergraduate training should include the three practice areas of therapeutic nutrition, community nutrition, and food service management.

=== United Kingdom ===
"Nutritionist" is not a protected term in the UK, unlike "dietitian"; the latter must be registered with the Health and Care Professions Council. The Association for Nutrition is a registered charity that holds the UK Voluntary Register of Nutritionists (UKVRN) and is recognised by Public Health England, NHS Careers as the regulator of Registered Nutritionists in the UK, with individuals requiring a minimum of an Honours Degree in nutrition science alongside a commitment to a set of standards for ethics, conduct and performance to become allowed entry to the UKVRN and conferred the title Registered Associate Nutritionist (ANutr) or Registered Nutritionist (RNutr).

Since 2002, the number of jobs for nutritionists has reportedly grown faster in the National Health Service (NHS) than in any other sector. The NHS states that "Dietitians and nutritionists have different roles and training and are regulated by different bodies." The growth of the nutritionist career could be due to an increasing focus on disease prevention, which is firmly within the remit and expertise of public health nutritionists, rather than just a focus on disease treatment and the clinical domain of dietitians.

=== United States ===
Certified Nutrition Specialists (CNS) are professionals who have an advanced degree in nutrition from a fully accredited institution. There are three distinct certification pathways, which include the CNS for Nutrition and Health Professionals (CNS), CNS for MDs and DOs (CNS), and CNS for Scholars (CNS-S). To be awarded the CNS credential, candidates must complete 1,000 supervised practice hours. They must also pass an examination that covers a spectrum of nutritional science and applied clinical topics. CNS practitioners commonly work in private and integrative health practices.

Registered dietitian nutritionists (RD; RDN) are health professionals qualified to provide safe, evidence-based dietary advice which includes a review of what is eaten, a thorough review of nutritional health, and a personalized nutritional treatment plan. They also provide preventive and therapeutic programs at work places, schools and similar institutions. Government regulation, especially in terms of licensing, is currently more universal for the RD or RDN than that of CCN.

Certified Clinical Nutritionists (CCN) are trained health professionals who offer dietary advice on the role of nutrition in chronic disease, including possible prevention or remediation by addressing nutritional deficiencies before resorting to drugs. Quackwatch has accused the group that provides credentialing to CCNs, and its members, of promoting highly dubious medical claims, including homeopathy, detoxification, and herbalism.

=== Malaysia ===
In Malaysia, "Nutritionist" is a legally protected and regulated professional title under the Allied Health Professions Act 2016 (Act 774). The profession is governed by the Malaysian Allied Health Professions Council (MAHPC) under the Ministry of Health.

To legally practice as a Registered Nutritionist in Malaysia, an individual must hold a recognized degree in nutrition science or a related discipline from an accredited tertiary institution and register with the MAHPC under Section 17 of Act 774. Practicing nutritionists are also required to hold an official Practising Certificate (PC), which is subject to periodic renewal. Unregistered individuals who claim the title or offer professional nutritional advice commit an offense under the Act.

Nutritionists in Malaysia primarily focus on public health promotion, disease prevention, community health education, and advisory roles within the food and sports industries, contrasting with dietitians who specialize in clinical medical nutrition therapy.

== See also ==
- Allied health professions
- Dietitian
