= Powerlist 2019 =

Annual ranking of influential Black British people

The 2019 Powerlist rankings were released in October 2018 and saw Meghan, Duchess of Sussex. included in the list for the first time, and named Ric Lewis as the most influential individual

== Top 10 ==
Rank	Individual	Occupation	Category	Notability
1	Ric Lewis	Businessperson	Business, Corporate, Financiers & Entrepreneurs	Chief Exec & Chairman of Tristan Capital Partners
2	Sharon White	Businessperson & Economist	Business, Corporate, Financiers & Entrepreneurs	Chief Executive at Ofcom
3	Ismail Ahmed	Businessperson	Business, Corporate, Financiers & Entrepreneurs	Founder & CEO of WorldRemit
4	Jacky Wright	Businessperson	Technology	Chief digital and information officer at HMRC
5	Sandie Okoro	Lawyer	Business, Corporate, Financiers & Entrepreneurs	Senior VP and general counsel at the World Bank Group
6	Ebele Okobi	Public policy director	Technology	Public policy director, Africa, the Middle East and Turkey for Facebook
7	Funmi Olonisakin	Professor	Public, Third Sector & Education	Professor of Leadership studies, peace and conflict at King's College London
8	Paulette Rowe	Businessperson	Technology	Global Head, Payments and Financial Services Partnerships, Facebook
9	Edward Enninful, OBE	Editor-in-Chief	Media, Publishing & Entertainment	Editor-in-Chief British Vogue
10	Richard Iferenta	Businessperson	Business, Corporate, Financiers & Entrepreneurs	Partner at KPMG

== Outside Top 10 ==
Also listed in the 2019 Powerlist were the following people, organised by industry:

Arts, Fashion and Design

- Chi-chi Nwanoku, OBE - Classical musician and founder of Chineke! Orchestra
- Chris Ofili - Turner Prize winning artist
- Delia Jarrett-Macauley - Chair of the Caine Prize, writer and academic
- Duro Olowu - Fashion designer
- Dr Shirley J Thompson, OBE - Composer, conductor and Reader in Music, University of Westminster
- Isaac Julien, CBE - Artist and filmmaker
- Lemn Sissay, MBE - Poet, author, broadcaster
- Lynette Yiadom-Boakye - Award-winning artist
- Matthew Morgan - Founder of Afropunk Festival
- Pat McGrath - Founder of Pat McGrath Labs, make-up artist
- Valerie Brandes - Founder and CEO of Jacaranda Books

Business, Corporate, Financiers and Entrepreneurs

- Alan Smith - Global Head of Risk Strategy and Chief of Staff, Global Risk at HSBC
- Brian Robinson - Senior managing director at Goldman Sachs
- Bukola Adisa - Head of Framework and Design at Barclays
- Eric Collins - Head of Operations at Touch Surgery
- Gary Stewart - Director, Telefonica Open Future and Wayra UK
- Heather Melville - Director and Head of Client Experience, PricewaterhouseCoopers UK.
- Netsai Mangwende - Head of Finance for Great Britain, Willis Towers Watson
- Pamela Hutchinson - Global Head of Diversity and Inclusion, Bloomberg
- Sandra Wallace - UK Managing Partner, DLA Piper
- Tunji Akintokun - Director at Cisco leading mid-market sales and partnerships for Africa
- Wol Kolade - Managing Partner, Livingbridge
- Yvonne Ike - Managing Director and Head of Sub-Saharan Africa region, BofA Securities

Media, Publishing and Entertainment

- Ade Adepitan, MBE - TV presenter and Paralympic wheelchair basketball player
- Afua Hirsch - Journalist, author, broadcaster
- Akala - Rapper, journalist, poet and activist
- Anne Mensah - Vice-president of Content UK, Netflix
- Amma Asante, MBE - Writer, director
- Charlene White - ITN News anchor
- David Harewood, MBE - Actor
- David Olusoga, OBE - Historian, joint Creative Director of Uplands Television Ltd
- Dumi Oburota - Founder of Disturbing London
- Femi Oguns, MBE - Founder and CEO of Identity School of Acting
- Gary Younge - Journalist and author
- Idris Elba, OBE - Actor, writer, producer, musician and DJ
- Jacqueline Simmons - Executive editor at Bloomberg L.P.
- John Boyega - Actor
- Kanya King, CBE -CEO/Founder, MOBO Awards
- Marcus Ryder - Chief International Editor of China Global Television Network Digital
- Mo Abudu - CEO/Executive Chair, EbonylifeTV
- Naomie Harris, OBE - Actor
- Paulette Simpson - Executive, Corporate Affairs and Public Policy, Jamaica National Group; Executive Director, The Voice Media Group
- Reggie Yates - Actor, broadcaster and DJ
- Reni Eddo-Lodge - Journalist, author
- Simon Frederick - Artist, photographer, director
- Sir Lenny Henry - Actor, writer, campaigner
- Stormzy - Grime artist
- Thandie Newton - Actor
- Tunde Ogungbesan - BBC head of diversity and inclusion
- Vanessa Kingori, MBE - Publisher, British Vogue
- Wayne Hector - Songwriter
- Yolisa Phahle - CEO, M-Net

Politics, Law and Religion

- Baroness Floella Benjamin DBE, DL - Peer, House of Lords, Policy maker, campaigner for children's rights
- Chuka Umunna - Labour Member of Parliament for Streatham
- Grace Ononiwu, CBE - Crown Prosecutor
- Joshua Siaw, MBE - Partner, White & Case
- Dr Kathryn Nwajiaku - Co-Director at Development Results
- David Lammy, MP - Member of Parliament for Tottenham

Public, Third Sector and Education

- Beverley Lewis, OBE - Co-Founder and Director of Operations, ACLT (African Caribbean Leukemia Trust)
- Dr Cheron Byfield - Governor and Trust Member of King Solomon International Business School
- Dr Margaret Casely-Hayford, CBE - Chair, Shakespeare's Globe, lawyer and businessperson
- Marvin Rees - Mayor of Bristol
- Meghan, Duchess of Sussex - Campaigner, actress
- Nero Ughwujabo - Special Adviser to the Prime Minister Theresa May
- Nira Chamberlain - President of Institute of Mathematics and its Applications
- Orin Lewis, OBE - Co-founder and chief-executive, ACLT (African Caribbean Leukemia Trust)
- Patricia Gallan - Retired Metropolitan Police Service assistant commissioner leading specialist crime and operations
- Lord Woolley - Co-founder/Director, Operation Black Vote
- David Waboso - Managing director of Network Rail's Digital Railway

Science, Medicine and Engineering

- Dr Emeka Okaro - Consultant Obstetrician and Gynaecologist
- Dr Ian Nnatu - Consultant psychiatrist at Charing Cross Hospital and Medical Director at Cygnet Hospital Harrow
- Dr Joy Odili - Consultant plastic surgeon at St George's Hospital
- Dr Sylvia Bartley - Senior Global Director, Medtronic Philanthropy
- Dr Samantha Tross - Consultant Orthopaedic Surgeon
- Prof. Laura Serrant, OBE - Head of Department and Professor of Community and Public Health Nursing at Manchester Metropolitan University

Sports

- Anthony Joshua, OBE - Boxer
- Denise Lewis - TV presenter and Olympic Gold medal-winning athlete
- Dina Asher Smith - British record-holding sprinter
- Lewis Hamilton, MBE - Formula One champion
- Luol Deng - Former NBA player
- Sir Mo Farah - Olympic Gold medal-winning athlete

Technology

- Baroness Oona King - Strategy for equity, diversity, inclusion & integrity for Google
- Ian Greenstreet - Founder and Chairman, Infinity Capital Partners and Member on the Advisory Board, London Stock Exchange
- Janet Thomas - Founder and CEO of TouchFX at Infinity Capital Partners
- Mariéme Jamme - CEO, SpotOne Global Solutions and Advisory Board Member, Data-Pop Alliance
- Martin Ijaha, CBE - Founder, Neyber
- Nneka Abulokwe, OBE - Founder and CEO, MicroMax Consulting

== See also ==
- Black British people
