= Success Talks =

- Formation: 1 December 2012; 13 years ago
- Founder: Dennis Owusu-Sem
- Purpose: Online interviews with successful people outside of sport or entertainment.
- Headquarters: United Kingdom
- Official language: English
- Website: www.success-talks.co.uk

Success Talks is an organisation that holds interviews with successful individuals from across the world with a focus on digital media and mobile phone applications. The majority of the content, which promote key messages that challenge current stereotypes about success, can be found on the organisation's YouTube channel, which was started in December 2012. Other interviews can also be found on its Facebook page and mobile phone app. Its channel has gained thousands of views as well as a following on Facebook and Twitter.

Success Talks has been quoted in publications such as the Financial Times. In recent years, Success Talks have diversified into creating events and have worked with organizations such as PwC, Linklaters, Credit Suisse, Pearson and Teach First.

== History ==
The concept for Success Talks arose when founder Dennis Owusu-Sem was having a conversation with a colleague about successful black individuals who were not in the fields of music, sport or entertainment. From this, he decided to find as many people as he could interview to answer this and many other questions around success.

== Interviews ==
Success Talks have amassed over 40 interviews which have been released on YouTube, Facebook, Podcasts and its own app. Below are some of individuals currently on the series:

- Baroness Patricia Scotland - Barrister and previous Attorney General for England and Wales and Advocate General for Northern Ireland
- Ken Olisa - Chairman Restoration Partners
- Karen Blackett - CEO Mediacom UK
- Christine Ohuruogu - Great Britain Athlete and Olympian
- Marc Hare - Founder of Mr Hare
- Piers Linney - Co-CEO Outsourcery and "Dragon" on Dragons' Den
- Raoul Shah -Founder and CEO of Exposure
- Errol Douglas - Celebrity Hair Stylist
- Courtenay Griffiths QC - Barrister at Bedford Court Chambers
- Sandie Okoro - General Counsel HSBC
- Anne-Marie Imafidon - Founder Stemettes
- Samantha Tross - Orthopaedic Surgeon
- Damon Buffini - Businessman and Ex- Managing Director Permira
- Atul Kochhar - Chef, restaurateur and television personality
- Adrien Sauvage - British fashion designer
- Jamal Edwards - Founder and CEO, SB.TV
- Walter White - Partner, McGuireWoods LLP
- Vanessa Kingori - Publisher, British GQ
- M. S. Banga (Vindi Banga) - Partner, Clayton, Dubilier & Rice
- Paul Cleal - Partner, PwC

∗ Success Quotes
