= Powerlist 2021 =

Annual ranking of influential Black British people

The 14th annual Powerlist, which names the 100 most influential people of African or African Caribbean heritage in the United Kingdom, was judged by an independent panel and published in November 2020, sponsored by JP Morgan & Co, PricewaterhouseCoopers, Linklaters, Refinitiv, Herman Miller, Facebook and The Executive Leadership Council. The 2021 Powerlist came in a year in which public debate on racial injustice had increased, with the Black Lives Matter (BLM) movement and global protests against police brutality. Therefore, chief executive Michael Eboda decided that the 14th Powerlist would honour those who have used their voice to advocate against racial injustice. Furthermore, the rankings highlighted the work of healthcare professionals during the ongoing COVID-19 pandemic, which also resulted in the awards being held virtually on 17 November 2020, hosted by Kwame Kwei-Armah.

The award event was held in partnership with JP Morgan & Co., who announced they would invest £2 million in support to London non-profit organisations headed by black and minority ethnic leaders. The independent panel of judges named Sir Lewis Hamilton as the most influential awardee, due to both his sporting excellence and his advocacy in light of the BLM movement, with additional highlights of the Top 10 including Prof. Kevin Fenton and Dame Donna Kinnair for their work fighting against COVID-19.

== Top 10 ==
Rank	Individual	Occupation	Category	Notability
1	Lewis Hamilton	Formula One driver	Sports	Seven-time world champion Formula One driver
2	Kevin Fenton	Public health leader	Public, Third Sector and Education	Regional director, Public Health England London
3	Stormzy	Grime music artist	Media, Publishing & Entertainment	Award-winning musician
4	Michaela Coel	Actor, screenwriter, director and producer	Media, Publishing & Entertainment	Creator, co-director and producer of BBC/HBO series I May Destroy You
5	Edward Enninful	Editor-in-chief	Media, Publishing & Entertainment	Editor-in-chief British Vogue
6	Donna Kinnair	Public health leader and nurse	Public, Third Sector and Education	CEO & general secretary, Royal College of Nursing
7	Jacqueline McKenzie	Human rights lawyer	Politics, Law and Religion	Director at Centre for Migration Advice and Research and McKenzie, Beute and Pope
8	David Olusoga	Historian, writer, broadcaster	Media, Publishing and Entertainment	Historian and TV presenter
9	Afua Hirsch	Writer, broadcaster, and former barrister	Media, Publishing and Entertainment	Journalist for The Guardian, author, broadcaster
10	Richard Iferenta	Businessperson	Business, Corporate, Financiers & Entrepreneurs	Partner at KPMG

== Also in the Top 100, by category ==
Arts, Fashion and Design

- Chi-chi Nwanoku - Classical musician and founder of Chineke! Orchestra
- Duro Olowu - Fashion designer
- Dr Shirley J Thompson - Composer, conductor and Reader in Music at University of Westminster
- Pat McGrath - Make-up artist and founder of Pat McGrath Labs
- Francesca Hayward - Principal dancer, The Royal Ballet
- Grace Wales Bonner - Fashion designer, founder and Creative Director at Wales Bonner
- Kobna Holdbrook-Smith - Actor and founding member of "Act for Change"
- John Boyega - Actor
- Idris Elba - Actor and producer

Business, Corporate, Financiers and Entrepreneurs

- Femi Bamisaiye - CIO Homeserve
- Nadja Bellan-White - Global CMO at Vice Media Group
- Jason Black (J2K) - Co-founder of Crep Protect and co-owner of Crepe and Cones
- Eric Collins - CEO and founding member of Impact X Capital Partners
- Camille Drummond - Vice President, Global Business Services at BP
- Yemi Edun - Founder/CEO of Daniel Ford & Co.
- Emeka Emembolu - Senior VP-North Sea BP
- Dean Forbes - President, The Access Group
- Pamela Hutchinson - Global Head of Diversity and Inclusion, Bloomberg
- Yvonne Ike - Managing Director and Head of Sub-Saharan Africa region, BofA Securities
- Adrian Joseph - Managing Director, Group AI & Data Solutions, BT Group
- Wol Kolade - Managing Partner, Livingbridge
- Lindelwe Lesley Ndlovu - CEO, AXA Africa Specialty Risks, Lloyd's of London
- Tara Lajumoke - Managing Director, Financial Times
- Netsai Mangwende - Head of Finance for Great Britain, Willis Towers Watson
- Tunde Olanrewaju - Senior Partner McKinsey & Company
- Paulette Rowe - CEO, Integrated and E-commerce Solutions, Paysafe Group
- Roni Savage - Managing Director, founder of Jomas Associates
- Alan Smith - Global Head of Risk Strategy and Chief of Staff, Global Risk at HSBC
- Tevin Tobun - Founder and CEO, GV Group Gate Ventures
- Sandra Wallace - UK Managing Partner, DLA Piper
- Dame Sharon White - chairman, John Lewis Partnership

Media, Publishing and Entertainment

- Kamal Ahmed - Editorial director, BBC News
- Akala - Rapper, journalist, poet and activist
- Amma Asante - Writer, director
- Lorna Clarke - BBC Controller of Pop Music
- Reni Eddo-Lodge - Journalist, author
- Bernardine Evaristo - Writer, professor of creative writing at Brunel University London
- Sir Lenny Henry - Actor, writer, campaigner
- Vanessa Kingori - Publisher, British Vogue
- Dorothy Koomson - Author
- Anne Mensah - Vice-president of Content UK, Netflix
- Hugh Muir - Senior assistant editor, The Guardian
- Femi Oguns - Founder and CEO of Identity School of Acting
- Marcus Ryder - Executive producer of multimedia Caixin
- Paulette Simpson - Executive, corporate affairs and public policy, Jamaica National Group; executive director, The Voice Media Group
- Annette Thomas - CEO The Guardian Media Group
- Charlene White - ITN News anchor
- Reggie Yates - Actor, broadcaster and DJ
- Gary Younge - Journalist and author; professor of sociology at University of Manchester

Politics, Law and Religion

- Stephanie Boyce - Deputy vice-president Law Society of England and Wales
- Martin Forde - Barrister
- Rev Rose Hudson-Wilkin - Bishop of Dover
- David Lammy - Shadow Secretary of State for Justice, Member of Parliament for Tottenham
- Harry Matovu - Barrister
- Dr Kathryn Nwajiaku - Director, Politics and Governance Overseas Development Institute
- Dr Sandie Okoro - Senior Vice President and Group General Counsel, World Bank
- Segun Osuntokun - Managing Partner, Bryan Cave Leighton Paisner
- Joshua Siaw - Partner, White & Case
- Patrick Vernon - Political activist
- Marcia Willis Stewart - Director, Birnberg Peirce & Partners

Public, Third Sector and Education

- Sonita Alleyne - Master, Jesus College, Cambridge
- Dr Margaret Casely-Hayford - chair, Shakespeare's Globe, Chancellor of Coventry University, Non-Executive Director, Co-op Group
- Nira Chamberlain - President of Institute of Mathematics and its Applications
- Professor Patricia Daley - Vice Principal of Jesus College, Oxford
- Dr Anne-Marie Imafidon - CEO and co-founder Stemettes
- Professor Funmi Olonisakin - Professor of Security, Leadership and Development at King's College London, Founding Director of African Leadership Centre
- Marvin Rees - Mayor of Bristol
- Lord Woolley - Co-founder/Director, Operation Black Vote

Science, Medicine and Engineering

- Dr Sylvia Bartley - Senior Global Director, Medtronic Foundation
- Professor Jacqueline Dunkley-Bent - Chief Midwifery Officer, NHS England
- Dr Jacqui Dyer - President of Mental Health Foundation
- Dr Paula Franklin - Chief Medical Officer at Bupa
- Dr Martin Griffiths - Lead trauma surgeon, Royal London Hospital & Clinical Director for Violence Reduction, NHS
- Dr Ian Nnatu - Consultant psychiatrist
- Dr Joy Odili - Consultant plastic surgeon
- Dr Emeka Okaro - Consultant obstetrician and gynaecologist
- Prof. Laura Serrant - Head of Department and Professor of Community and Public Health Nursing at Manchester Metropolitan University
- Dr Samantha Tross - Consultant orthopaedic surgeon

Sports

- Dina Asher Smith - British record-holding sprinter
- Anthony Joshua - Boxer
- Marcus Rashford - Footballer and campaigner against child poverty
- Raheem Sterling - Footballer

Technology

- Nneka Abulokwe - Founder and CEO, MicroMax Consulting
- Ije Nwokorie - Senior Director, Apple
- Ebele Okobi - Public policy director, Africa, the Middle East and Turkey for Facebook
- Jacky Wright - Chief digital officer & Corporate VP at Microsoft
