= Powerlist 2020 =

Annual ranking of influential Black British people

The 13th annual Powerlist was judged by a panel chaired by Dame Linda Dobbs and published in October 2019; sponsored by J.P. Morgan & Co, PwC, linklaters and The Executive Leadership Council.

== Top 10 ==
Rank	Individual	Occupation	Category	Notability
1	Ismail Ahmed	Businessperson	Business, Corporate, Financiers & Entrepreneurs	founder & chairman of WorldRemit
2	Pat McGrath	Make-up Artist	Arts, Fashion & Design	founder of Pat McGrath Labs
3	Michael Sherman	Businessperson	Business, Corporate, Financiers & Entrepreneurs	Chief strategy and transformation officer at BT Group
4	Jacky Wright	Businessperson	Technology	Chief digital officer at Microsoft
5	Stormzy	Grime Artist	Media, Publishing & Entertainment	Award-winning musician
6	Edward Enninful, OBE	Editor-in-Chief	Media, Publishing & Entertainment	Editor-in-Chief British Vogue
7	Ebele Okobi	Public policy director	Technology	Public policy director, Africa, the Middle East and Turkey for Facebook
8	Paulette Rowe	Businessperson	Technology	Global Head, Payments and Financial Services Partnerships, Facebook
9	Lynette Yiadom-Boakye	Artist	Arts, Fashion & Design	Award-winning painter
10	Richard Iferenta	Businessperson	Business, Corporate, Financiers & Entrepreneurs	Partner at KPMG

== Outside Top 10 ==
Also listed in the 2020 Powerlist were the following people, organised by industry:

Arts, Fashion and Design

- Adwoa Aboah - fashion model and founder of Gurls Talk
- Chi-chi Nwanoku, OBE - classical musician and founder of Chineke! Orchestra
- Duro Olowu - fashion designer
- Dr Shirley J Thompson, OBE - composer, conductor and Reader in Music, University of Westminster
- Isaac Julien, CBE - artist and filmmaker
- Lemn Sissay, OBE - poet, author, broadcaster
- Matthew Morgan - founder of Afropunk Festival
- Valerie Brandes - founder and CEO of Jacaranda Books

Business, Corporate, Financiers and Entrepreneurs

- Alan Smith - Global Head of Risk Strategy and Chief of Staff, Global Risk at HSBC
- Arunma Oteh, OON - academic scholar, St Antony's College, Oxford, former Treasurer and Vice President of the World Bank
- Bukola Adisa - Head of Framework and Design at Barclays
- Camille Drummond - Vice President, Global Business Services at BP
- Eric Collins - CEO and Founding Member, Impact X Capital Partners
- Gary Stewart - Director, Telefonica Open Future & Wayra UK
- Jason Black (J2K) - co-founder of Crep Protect and co-owner of Crepe and Cones
- Lindelwe Lesley Ndlovu - CEO, AXA Africa Specialty Risks, Lloyd's of London
- Netsai Mangwende - Head of Finance for Great Britain, Willis Towers Watson
- Pamela Hutchinson - Global Head of Diversity and Inclusion, Bloomberg
- Patricia Lewis - Managing Director & Head of European Loans and Special Situations Sales, BofA Securities
- Sandra Wallace - UK Managing Partner, DLA Piper
- Dame Sharon White - chairman, John Lewis Partnership
- Tavaziva Madzinga - CEO, Swiss Re UK & Ireland
- Tevin Tobun - founder and CEO, GV Group Gate Ventures
- Wol Kolade - Managing Partner, Livingbridge
- Yvonne Ike - Managing Director and Head of Sub Saharan Africa region, BofA Securities

Media, Publishing and Entertainment

- Ade Adepitan, MBE - TV presenter and Paralympic wheelchair basketball player
- Afua Hirsch - journalist, author, broadcaster
- Akala - rapper, journalist, poet and activist
- Anne Mensah - Vice-president of Content UK, Netflix
- Amma Asante, MBE - writer, director
- Charlene White - ITN News anchor
- David Olusoga, OBE - historian, Joint Creative Director of Uplands Television Ltd
- Femi Oguns, MBE - founder and CEO of Identity School of Acting
- Gary Younge - journalist and author
- Idris Elba, OBE - actor, writer, producer, musician and DJ
- John Boyega - Actor
- Kanya King, CBE -CEO/Founder, MOBO Awards
- Lorna Clarke - Head of Production, BBC Radio 2 & BBC Radio 6 Music
- Marcus Ryder - Chief International Editor of China Global Television Network Digital
- Mo Abudu - CEO/Executive Chair, EbonylifeTV
- Naomie Harris, OBE - actor
- Paulette Simpson - Executive, Corporate Affairs and Public Policy, Jamaica National Group; executive director, The Voice Media Group
- Reggie Yates - actor, broadcaster and DJ
- Reni Eddo-Lodge - journalist, author
- Simon Frederick - artist, photographer, director
- Sir Lenny Henry - actor, writer, campaigner
- Vanessa Kingori, MBE - publisher, British Vogue
- Yolisa Phahle - CEO, General Entertainment, Naspers Ltd

Politics, Law and Religion

- Baroness Floella Benjamin DBE, DL - Peer, House of Lords, policy maker, campaigner for children's rights
- David Lammy, MP - Member of Parliament for Tottenham
- Dr Sandie Okoro - Senior Vice President and Group General Counsel, World Bank
- Grace Ononiwu, CBE - Chief Crown Prosecutor, West Midlands
- Joshua Siaw, MBE - Partner, White & Case
- Dr Kathryn Nwajiaku - Head of International Dialogue on Peacebuilding and Statebuilding Secretariat, OECD
- Martin Forde, QC - barrister
- Rev Rose Hudson-Wilkin - Chaplain to the Speaker of the House of Commons
- Segun Osuntokun - Managing Partner, Bryan Cave Leighton Paisner

Public, Third Sector and Education

- Beverley De Gale, OBE & Orin Lewis, OBE - Founders, ACLT (African Caribbean Leukemia Trust)
- Dr Cheron Byfield - Governor and founder of King Solomon International Business School and CEO Excell3
- Dr Dayo Olukoshi, OBE - Principal, Brampton Manor Academy
- Dr Margaret Casely-Hayford, CBE - chair, Shakespeare's Globe, Chancellor of Coventry University, Non-Executive Director, Co-op Group
- Marvin Rees - Mayor of Bristol
- Meghan, Duchess of Sussex - campaigner, actress
- Nira Chamberlain - President of Institute of Mathematics and its Applications
- Professor Funmi Olonisakin - Vice-president and Vice-Principal International and Professor of Security, Leadership and Development at King's College London
- Lord Woolley - Co-founder/Director, Operation Black Vote
- Sonita Alleyne, OBE - Master, Jesus College, Cambridge and member of BBC Trust

Science, Medicine and Engineering

- Dame Donna Kinnair - CEO & General Secretary, Royal College of Nursing
- Dr Emeka Okaro - Consultant Obstetrician and Gynaecologist
- Dr Ian Nnatu - Consultant psychiatrist
- Dr Joy Odili - Consultant plastic surgeon
- Dr Martin Griffiths - Lead trauma surgeon, Royal London Hospital & Clinical Director for Violence Reduction, NHS
- Dr Samantha Tross - Consultant Orthopaedic Surgeon
- Dr Sylvia Bartley - Senior Global Director, Medtronic Philanthropy
- Prof. Laura Serrant, OBE - Head of Department and Professor of Community and Public Health Nursing at Manchester Metropolitan University
- Prof. Jacqueline Dunkley-Bent, OBE - Chief Midwifery Officer, NHS England

Sports

- Anthony Joshua, OBE - boxer
- Dina Asher Smith - British record-holding sprinter
- Eniola Aluko - Footballer
- Lewis Hamilton, MBE - Formula One champion
- Luol Deng - former NBA player
- Nicola Adams, OBE - boxer
- Raheem Sterling - footballer

Technology

- Dr Anne-Marie Imafidon, MBE - CEO and co-founder, Stemettes
- Baroness Oona King - Vice President of Diversity and Inclusion, Snap Inc.
- Ian Greenstreet - founder and chairman, Infinity Capital Partners and Member on the advisory board, London Stock Exchange
- Ije Nwokorie - Senior Director, Apple Inc.
- Mariéme Jamme - CEO, SpotOne Global Solutions and Advisory Board Member, Data-Pop Alliance
- Martin Ijaha, CBE - founder, Neyber
- Nneka Abulokwe, OBE - founder and CEO, MicroMax Consulting
