= Powerlist =

Annual ranking of influential Black British people

- List of the 100 most influential people of African or African Caribbean heritage in the UK

Publication details
- Publisher: Powerful Media
- First published: 2007
- Latest publication: October 24, 2025

Powerlist 2026
- Most Influential: Afua Kyei

The Powerlist is a list of the 100 most influential people of African or African Caribbean heritage in the United Kingdom. The list is updated annually and has been published in book format by Powerful Media since 2007. The Powerlist is not limited to British-born citizens and includes immigrants to the UK.

== History and methodology ==
The list was first created in 2007 by Michael Eboda, then editor of the New Nation, a weekly newspaper published in the UK for the Black British community, as a way to profile and celebrate influential Black Britons, and inspire and influence the next generation. The first Powerlist was compiled after six months of research and debate, during which period 400 people of influence were whittled down to 50 women and 50 men, then ranked into respective top 10s, with the results announced in August 2007. During the first few editions, separate top-10 rankings were produced for both female and male candidates and top-ranking individuals could continue to be ranked the following year. From 2012, the 50 highest-rated nominees, along with updates on the previous year's Powerlistees from rank 2–100, are then ranked by an independent panel in the summer, with the list being produced each autumn. Each year's highest-ranking individual is added to the Powerlist Hall of Fame

== Hall of Fame ==
A list of every Powerlist highest ranking individual.

Year	Portrait	Name	Occupation	Category	Notability
2026		Afua Kyei	Financial executive	Business, Corporate, Financiers & Entrepreneurs	CFO, Bank of England
2025		Dean Forbes	Businessperson	Business, Corporate, Financiers & Entrepreneurs	CEO, Forterro and Partner at Corten Capital
2024		Edward Enninful, OBE	Editor	Media, Publishing & Entertainment	Former editor-in-chief of British Vogue, European editorial director of Condé Nast
2023		Dame Sharon White	Businessperson	Business, Corporate, Financiers & Entrepreneurs	Chair of the John Lewis Partnership, the British employee-owned retailer
2022		Jacky Wright	Businessperson	Technology	Chief digital officer at Microsoft
2021		Sir Lewis Hamilton, MBE	Formula 1 Driver	Sports	Seven-time World Champion Formula One driver
2020		Ismail Ahmed	Businessperson	Business, Corporate, Financiers & Entrepreneurs	founder & chairman of WorldRemit
2019		Ric Lewis	Businessperson	Business, Corporate, Financiers & Entrepreneurs	Chief Exec & Chairman of Tristan Capital Partners
2018		Gina Miller	Businessperson & Activist	Business, Corporate, Financiers & Entrepreneurs	Activist known for her work challenging Brexit
2017		Tom Ilube, CBE	Businessperson	Business, Corporate, Financiers & Entrepreneurs	Founder of Crossword Cyber Security, Africa Gifted Foundation
2016		Sir Ken Olisa, OBE	Businessperson & Philanthropist	Business, Corporate, Financiers & Entrepreneurs	Lord-Lieutenant of Greater London
2015		Karen Blackett, OBE	Businessperson	Business, Corporate, Financiers & Entrepreneurs	CEO of MediaCom UK
2014		Malorie Blackman, OBE	Author	Media, Publishing & Entertainment	Writer of more than 60 children's books and Children's Laureate
2013		Sir David Adjaye, OBE	Architect	Arts, Fashion & design	Designer of the National Museum of African American History in Washington, DC
2012		Tidjane Thiam	Businessperson	Business, Corporate, Financiers & Entrepreneurs	CEO of Prudential plc
2011		Tidjane Thiam	Businessperson	Business, Corporate, Financiers & Entrepreneurs	CEO of Prudential plc
2010		Baroness Scotland	Attorney General	Politics, Law and Religion	First Female & Black person to be Attorney General for England and Wales
2008 (Male)		Dr. Mo Ibrahim	Businessperson & Philanthropist	Business, Corporate, Financiers & Entrepreneurs	Chairman & Founder of Mo Ibrahim Foundation
2008 (Female)		Baroness Scotland	Attorney General	Politics, Law and Religion	First Female & Black person to be Attorney General for England and Wales
2007 (Male)		Sir Damon Buffini	Businessperson & Philanthropist	Business, Corporate, Financiers & Entrepreneurs	Private equity baron at Permira
2007 (Female)		Baroness Scotland	Attorney General	Politics, Law and Religion	First Female & Black person to be Attorney General for England and Wales

== 2020s ==
=== 2026 Powerlist Rankings ===
Published in October 2025, Afua Kyei, the chief financial officer of the Bank of England, was named as the UK's most influential black person for its 20th edition.

==== Top 10 ====
Rank	Individual	Occupation	Category	Notability
1	Afua Kyei	Financial Executive	Business, Corporates, Financiers & Entrepreneurs	CFO, Bank of England
2	Ian Wright MBE, OBE	Footballer and pundit	Media, Publishing, Entertainment, Sport	Television pundit, former professional footballer
3	Dame Pat McGrath, DBE	Make-up artist	Arts, Fashion & Design	Creative Director for Cosmetics, La Beauté Louis Vuitton
4	Pamela Maynard	Technology executive	Technology	Chief AI Transformation Officer, Microsoft Customer and Partner Solutions
5	Joshua Siaw, MBE	Lawyer	Law and Religion	Partner, White & Case
6	Tunde Olanrewaju CBE	Businessperson	Business, Corporates, Financiers & Entrepreneurs	Senior Partner and Managing Partner, McKinsey & Company
7	Steven Bartlett	Businessperson	Business, Corporates, Financiers & Entrepreneurs	Entrepreneur and Dragon, Dragon’s Den
8	Emma Grede	Businessperson	Business, Corporates, Financiers & Entrepreneurs	CEO, Co-founder, Good American
9	Sir Idris Elba, OBE	Actor	Media, Publishing, Entertainment, Sport	Actor and rapper, Co-owner of Kiro Race Co.
10	Ije Nwokorie	Businessperson	Business, Corporates, Financiers & Entrepreneurs	Chief Executive Officer, Dr Martens PLC

=== 2025 Powerlist Rankings ===
Published in October 2024, Dean Forbes, the CEO of Forterro and a Partner at Corten Capital, was named as the UK's most influential black person for its 19th edition.

==== Top 10 ====
Rank	Individual	Occupation	Category	Notability
1	Dean Forbes	Businessperson	Business, Corporate, Financiers & Entrepreneurs	CEO, Forterro and partner at Corten Capital
2	Bernard Mensah	Businessperson	Business, Corporate, Financiers & Entrepreneurs	President of international, Bank of America; chief executive officer, MLI
3	Afua Kyei	Financial executive	Business, Corporate, Financiers & Entrepreneurs	Chief Financial Officer, Bank of England
4	Emma Grede	Businessperson	Business, Corporate, Financiers & Entrepreneurs	Chief executive officer and Co-Founder, Good American; Founding Partner, Skims
5	Joshua Siaw, MBE	Lawyer	Politics, Law and Religion	Partner, White & Case
6	Tunde Olanrewaju	Businessperson	Business, Corporate, Financiers & Entrepreneurs	Senior Partner and Managing Partner, McKinsey & Company
7	Alexander and Oliver Kent-Braham	Businessperson	Business, Corporate, Financiers & Entrepreneurs	Founders, Marshmallow
8	Adejoké Bakare	Businessperson	Business, Corporate, Financiers & Entrepreneurs	Chef-owner, Chishuru, Michelin-starred restaurant
9	Justin Onuekwusi	Businessperson	Business, Corporate, Financiers & Entrepreneurs	Chief investment officer, St James’s Place
10	Pamela Maynard	Businessperson	Business, Corporate, Financiers & Entrepreneurs	Chief AI transformation officer, Microsoft

=== 2024 Powerlist Rankings ===
Published in October 2023, former editor-in-chief of British Vogue, Edward Enninful OBE, was named as the UK's most influential black person for its 18th edition.

==== Top 10 ====
Rank	Individual	Occupation	Category	Notability
1	Edward Enninful, OBE	Editor	Media, Publishing & Entertainment	Former editor-in-chief of British Vogue, European editorial director of Condé Nast
2	Dean Forbes	Businessperson	Business, Corporate, Financiers & Entrepreneurs	CEO, Forterro and Partner at Corten Capital
3	Afua Kyei	Financial executive	Business, Corporate, Financiers & Entrepreneurs	Chief Financial Officer, Bank of England
4	Marvin Rees	Politician	Public, Third Sector and Education	Mayor of Bristol
5	Tunde Olanrewaju	Businessperson	Business, Corporate, Financiers & Entrepreneurs	Senior Partner and Managing Partner, McKinsey & Company
6	Joshua Siaw, MBE	Lawyer	Politics, Law and Religion	Partner, White & Case
7	Syreeta Brown	Businessperson	Business, Corporate, Financiers & Entrepreneurs	Group Chief People and Communications Officer, Virgin Money UK
8	Paulette Simpson, CBE	Businessperson	Media, Publishing and Entertainment	Executive, Corporate Affairs and Public Policy, Jamaica National Bank; Executive Director, The Voice Media Group
9	Vanessa Kingori, CBE	Publisher	Media, Publishing and Entertainment	Chief Business Officer, Condé Nast Britain, Vogue European Business Advisor
10	Simon Woolley, Baron Woolley of Woodford	Politician and Activist	Public, Third Sector and Education	Co-founder and Director of Operation Black Vote and Principal of Homerton College, University of Cambridge

=== 2023 Powerlist Rankings ===
Published in October 2022, the 2023 Powerlist Top 10 was dominated by business people. Once again the panel of judges was led by retired high court judge Dame Linda Dobbs, and also included former Powerlister and winner of the first series of The Apprentice, Tim Campbell.

==== Top 10 ====
Rank	Individual	Occupation	Category	Notability
1	Dame Sharon White	Businessperson	Business, Corporate, Financiers & Entrepreneurs	Chair, John Lewis Partnership
2	Dean Forbes	Businessperson	Business, Corporate, Financiers & Entrepreneurs	CEO, Forterro and Partner at Corten Capital
3	Anne Mensah	Businessperson	Media, Publishing & Entertainment	Vice-president of Content UK, Netflix
4	Tunde Olanrewaju	Businessperson	Business, Corporate, Financiers & Entrepreneurs	Senior Partner and Managing Partner, McKinsey & Company
5	Steven Bartlett	Businessperson	Media, Publishing & Entertainment	Founder and former CEO of Social Chain; Dragon on Dragons' Den
6	David Olusoga, OBE	Historian, Writer, Broadcaster	Media, Publishing and Entertainment	Broadcaster & Joint Creative Director of Uplands Television Ltd
7	Simon Woolley, Baron Woolley of Woodford	Politician and Activist	Public, Third Sector and Education	Co-founder and Director of Operation Black Vote and Principal of Homerton College, University of Cambridge
8	Paulette Simpson, CBE	Businessperson	Media, Publishing and Entertainment	Executive, Corporate Affairs and Public Policy, Jamaica National Bank; Executive Director, The Voice Media Group
9	Richard Iferenta	Businessperson	Business, Corporate, Financiers & Entrepreneurs	Partner, Vice Chair, KPMG
10	Dr. Sandie Okoro	Lawyer	Business, Corporate, Financiers & Entrepreneurs	General Counsel, Standard Chartered Bank

=== 2022 Powerlist Rankings ===
Published in October 2021, the panel of judges was led by retired high court judge Dame Linda Dobbs and included former Powerlister Matthew Ryder QC.

==== Top 10 ====
Rank	Individual	Occupation	Category	Notability
1	Jacky Wright	Businessperson	Technology	Chief digital officer at Microsoft
2	Marcus Rashford	Footballer	Sports	England and Manchester United footballer, and campaigner against child poverty and racism
3	Anne Mensah	Businessperson	Media, Publishing & Entertainment	Vice-president of Content UK, Netflix
4	Daniel Kaluuya	Actor	Media, Publishing & Entertainment	Oscar and Golden Globe winning actor for portrayal of the Chicago Black Panther leader Fred Hampton in Judas and the Black Messiah
5	Prof. Kevin Fenton	Public-Health Leader	Science, Medicine & Engineering	London regional director at Public Health England, who has played a key role highlighting COVID-19 and inequality
6	Steven Bartlett	Businessperson	Media, Publishing & Entertainment	Founder and former CEO of Social Chain; Dragon on Dragons' Den
7	Michaela Coel	Actor, Screenwriter, Director and Producer	Media, Publishing & Entertainment	Creator, co-director and producer of BBC/HBO series I May Destroy You
8	Simon Woolley, Baron Woolley of Woodford	Politician and Activist	Public, Third Sector and Education	Co-founder and Director of Operation Black Vote and Principal of Homerton College, University of Cambridge
9	Richard Iferenta	Businessperson	Business, Corporate, Financiers & Entrepreneurs	Partner at KPMG
10	Jacqueline McKenzie	Human Rights Lawyer	Politics, Law and Religion	Director at Centre for Migration Advice and Research and McKenzie, Beute and Pope

=== 2021 Powerlist Rankings ===
The 2021 Powerlist came in a year in which public debate on racial injustice had increased, with the Black Lives Matter movement and global protests against police brutality. Therefore, chief executive Michael Eboda decided that the 14th Powerlist would honour those who had used their voice to advocate against racial injustice. Due to the ongoing COVID-19 pandemic, the awards were held virtually on November 17, 2020, and hosted by Kwame Kwei-Armah, OBE. The event was held in partnership with J.P. Morgan & Co., who announced they would invest £2 million in support of London non-profit organisations headed by black and minority ethnic leaders; further sponsors included PricewaterhouseCoopers, Facebook, and Linklaters. The independent panel of judges named Sir Lewis Hamilton as the most influential due to both his sporting excellence and his advocacy in light of the BLM movement; additional highlights of the Top 10 included Prof. Kevin Fenton and Dame Donna Kinnair for their work fighting against COVID-19.

==== Top 10 ====
Rank	Individual	Occupation	Category	Notability
1	Sir Lewis Hamilton, MBE	Formula 1 Driver	Sports	Seven-time World Champion Formula One driver
2	Prof. Kevin Fenton	Public-Health Leader	Public, Third Sector and Education	Regional Director, Public Health England London
3	Stormzy	Grime Artist	Media, Publishing & Entertainment	Award-winning Musician
4	Michaela Coel	Actor, Screenwriter, Director and Producer	Media, Publishing & Entertainment	Creator, co-director and producer of BBC/HBO series I May Destroy You
5	Edward Enninful, OBE	Editor-in-Chief	Media, Publishing & Entertainment	Editor-in-Chief of British Vogue
6	Dame Donna Kinnair	Public-Health Leader & Nurse	Public, Third Sector and Education	CEO & General Secretary, Royal College of Nursing
7	Jacqueline McKenzie	Human Rights Lawyer	Politics, Law and Religion	Director at Centre for Migration Advice and Research and McKenzie, Beute and Pope
8	David Olusoga, OBE	Historian, Writer, Broadcaster	Media, Publishing and Entertainment	Historian and TV presenter
9	Afua Hirsch	Writer, Broadcaster, and Former Barrister	Media, Publishing and Entertainment	Journalist for The Guardian, author and broadcaster
10	Richard Iferenta	Businessperson	Business, Corporate, Financiers & Entrepreneurs	Partner at KPMG

=== 2020 Powerlist ===
The 13th annual Powerlist was judged by a panel chaired by Dame Linda Dobbs and published in October 2019; sponsored by J.P. Morgan & Co., PwC, Linklaters and The Executive Leadership Council.

Rank	Individual	Occupation	Category	Notability
1	Ismail Ahmed	Businessperson	Business, Corporate, Financiers & Entrepreneurs	Founder & chairman of WorldRemit
2	Dame Pat McGrath	Make-up Artist	Arts, Fashion & design	Founder of Pat McGrath Labs
3	Michael Sherman	Businessperson	Business, Corporate, Financiers & Entrepreneurs	Chief strategy and transformation officer at BT Group
4	Jacky Wright	Businessperson	Technology	Chief digital officer at Microsoft
5	Stormzy	Grime Artist	Media, Publishing & Entertainment	Award-winning Musician
6	Edward Enninful, OBE	Editor-in-Chief	Media, Publishing & Entertainment	Editor-in-Chief of British Vogue
7	Ebele Okobi	Public Policy Director	Technology	Public policy director, Africa, the Middle East and Turkey, Facebook
8	Paulette Rowe	Businessperson	Technology	Global Head, Payments and Financial Services Partnerships, Facebook
9	Lynette Yiadom-Boakye	Artist	Arts, Fashion & design	Award-winning Painter
10	Richard Iferenta	Businessperson	Business, Corporate, Financiers & Entrepreneurs	Partner at KPMG

== 2010s ==
=== 2019 Rankings ===
The 2019 Rankings were released in October 2018 and saw Meghan, Duchess of Sussex included in the list for the first time and named Ric Lewis as the most influential individual.

Rank	Individual	Occupation	Category	Notability
1	Ric Lewis	Businessperson	Business, Corporate, Financiers & Entrepreneurs	Chief Executive & Chairman of Tristan Capital Partners
2	Dame Sharon White	Businessperson & Economist	Business, Corporate, Financiers & Entrepreneurs	Chief Executive at Ofcom
3	Ismail Ahmed	Businessperson	Business, Corporate, Financiers & Entrepreneurs	Founder & CEO of WorldRemit
4	Jacky Wright	Businessperson	Technology	Chief digital and information officer at HMRC
5	Dr. Sandie Okoro	Lawyer	Business, Corporate, Financiers & Entrepreneurs	Senior VP and general counsel at the World Bank Group
6	Ebele Okobi	Public Policy Director	Technology	Public policy director, Africa, the Middle East and Turkey, Facebook
7	Funmi Olonisakin	Professor	Public, Third Sector & Education	Professor of Leadership studies, peace and conflict at King's College London
8	Paulette Rowe	Businessperson	Technology	Global Head, Payments and Financial Services Partnerships, Facebook
9	Edward Enninful, OBE	Editor-in-Chief	Media, Publishing & Entertainment	Editor-in-Chief of British Vogue
10	Richard Iferenta	Businessperson	Business, Corporate, Financiers & Entrepreneurs	Partner at KPMG

=== 2018 Rankings ===
The 2018 Rankings were released in October 2017 and saw Gina Miller named as the most influential black person in the UK. The list was compiled by a panel that included Dame Linda Dobbs and Tim Campbell, and more than half of the 100 people on this year's list were women.

Rank	Individual	Occupation	Category	Notability
1	Gina Miller	Businessperson & Activist	Business, Corporate, Financiers & Entrepreneurs	Activist known for her work challenging Brexit
2	Ric Lewis	Businessperson	Business, Corporate, Financiers & Entrepreneurs	Chief Executive & Chairman of Tristan Capital Partners
3	Ismail Ahmed	Businessperson	Business, Corporate, Financiers & Entrepreneurs	Founder & CEO of WorldRemit
4	Dame Sharon White	Businessperson & Economist	Business, Corporate, Financiers & Entrepreneurs	Chief Executive at Ofcom
5	Nira Chamberlain	Professional Mathematician	Public, Third Sector & Education	Member of Institute of Mathematics and its Applications
6	Jacky Wright	Businessperson	Technology	Chief digital and information officer at HMRC
7	Sandra Wallace	Lawyer	Business, Corporate, Financiers & Entrepreneurs	UK managing partner, DLA Piper
8	Prof. Laura Serrant	Academic in Nursing	Public, Third Sector & Education	Professor of Nursing, Sheffield Hallam University
9	Dr. Shirley J Thompson	Composer	Public, Third Sector & Education	Music composer, visionary and cultural activist
10	Edward Enninful, OBE	Editor-in-Chief	Media, Publishing & Entertainment	Editor-in-Chief of British Vogue

=== 2017 Rankings ===
The 2017 Powerlist marked the 10th anniversary of the event, with a keynote speech made by Mayor of London, Sadiq Khan were released in October 2016 and named as the most influential black person in the UK. The list was decided by an independent panel led by former high court judge Dame Linda Dobbs.

Rank	Individual	Occupation	Category	Notability
1	Tom Ilube, CBE	Businessperson	Business, Corporate, Financiers & Entrepreneurs	Founder of Crossword Cyber Security, Africa Gifted Foundation
2	Ric Lewis	Businessperson	Business, Corporate, Financiers & Entrepreneurs	Chief Executive & Chairman of Tristan Capital Partners
3	Arlene Isaacs-Lowe	Businessperson	Business, Corporate, Financiers & Entrepreneurs	Head of Relationship Management, EMEA, Moody's
4	Sir Lenny Henry	Actor, comedian & Campaigner	Media, Publishing & Entertainment	Co-founder of Comic Relief
5	Sir Mo Farah, CBE	Professional Athlete	Sports	Four-time gold medalist at the Olympic Games
6	Lewis Hamilton, MBE	Formula 1 Driver	Sports	Three-time Formula 1 World Champion
7	Ismail Ahmed	Businessperson	Business, Corporate, Financiers & Entrepreneurs	Founder & CEO of WorldRemit
8	Dr. Shirley J Thompson	Composer	Public, Third Sector & Education	Music composer, visionary and cultural activist
9	Dame Sharon White	Businessperson & Economist	Business, Corporate, Financiers & Entrepreneurs	Chief Executive at Ofcom
10	Sir Steve McQueen, CBE	Film Director	Media, Publishing & Entertainment	Multiple award-winning Director

=== 2016 Rankings ===
The 2016 Powerlist named Sir Ken Olisa, OBE as the most influential Black Briton for his charitable work and his achievement becoming the first black Lord-Lieutenant of Greater London.

Rank	Individual	Occupation	Category	Notability
1	Sir Ken Olisa, OBE	Businessperson & Philanthropist	Business, Corporate, Financiers & Entrepreneurs	Lord-Lieutenant of Greater London
2	Sir Lenny Henry	Actor, comedian & Campaigner	Media, Publishing & Entertainment	Co-founder of Comic Relief
3	Dame Sharon White	Businessperson & Economist	Business, Corporate, Financiers & Entrepreneurs	Chief Executive at Ofcom
4	Sir Steve McQueen, CBE	Film Director	Media, Publishing & Entertainment	Multiple award-winning Director
5	Lewis Hamilton, MBE	Formula 1 Driver	Sports	Three-time Formula 1 World Champion
6	Baroness Lawrence, OBE	Campaigner	Public, Third Sector & Education	Justice campaigner
7	Dr. Maggie Aderin-Pocock, MBE	Space Scientist	Public, Third Sector & Education	Space scientist and science educator, University College London
8	Sir Mo Farah, CBE	Professional Athlete	Sports	Two-time gold medalist at the Olympic Games
9	Dr. Sandie Okoro	Lawyer	Business, Corporate, Financiers & Entrepreneurs	Global general counsel of HSBC Asset Management
10	Adrian Joseph	Businessperson	Technology	Director, Enterprise Analytics Services, EMEA Google

=== 2015 Rankings ===
The 2015 Powerlist was announced in November 2014 and took place in the Lord Mayor of London's residence, with a keynote speech given by then Home Secretary, Theresa May. The list named Karen Blackett, OBE as the most influential Black Briton, marking her as the first black businesswoman to be awarded the accolade and also saw two people ranked jointly in both third & eighth position.

Rank	Individual	Occupation	Category	Notability
1	Karen Blackett, OBE	Businessperson	Business, Corporate, Financiers & Entrepreneurs	CEO of MediaCom UK
2	Sir Ken Olisa, OBE	Businessperson & Philanthropist	Business, Corporate, Financiers & Entrepreneurs	Lord-Lieutenant of Greater London
=3	Chuka Umunna	Politician	Public, Third Sector & Education	Shadow Business Secretary & Labour MP
=3	Helen Grant	Politician	Public, Third Sector & Education	Minister for Sport & Tourism & Conservative MP
4	Dr. Sandie Okoro	Lawyer	Business, Corporate, Financiers & Entrepreneurs	Global general counsel of HSBC Asset Management
5	Sir Steve McQueen, CBE	Film Director	Media, Publishing & Entertainment	Artist & director of 12 Years a Slave
6	Matthew Ryder QC	Barrister	Public, Third Sector & Education	Barrister specialising in complex criminal cases and civil litigation
7	Dame Sharon White	Civil Servant	Public, Third Sector & Education	Second Permanent Secretary to the Treasury
=8	Sir Lenny Henry	Actor, comedian & Campaigner	Media, Publishing & Entertainment	Co-founder of Comic Relief
=8	Sir Idris Elba, KBE	Actor & producer	Media, Publishing & Entertainment	Actor
9	Adrian Joseph	Businessperson	Technology	Director, Enterprise Analytics Services, EMEA Google
10	Lewis Hamilton, MBE	Formula 1 Driver	Sports	Three-time Formula 1 World Champion

=== 2014 Rankings ===
An independent panel of five judges, headed by management consultant Vivian Hunt and including business executive Olakunle Babarinde, ranked the 100 most influential Black Britons on merit, with children's author Malorie Blackman, OBE first in the yearly ranking.

Rank	Individual	Occupation	Category	Notability
1	Malorie Blackman, OBE	Author	Media, Publishing & Entertainment	Writer of more than 60 children's books and Children's Laureate
2	Sir Ken Olisa, OBE	Businessperson & Philanthropist	Business, Corporate, Financiers & Entrepreneurs	Chair of Restoration Partners
3	Matthew Ryder QC	Barrister	Public, Third Sector & Education	Barrister specialising in complex criminal cases and civil litigation
4	Sir Mo Farah, MBE	Athlete	Sports	Olympic Gold Medalist
5	Karen Blackett, OBE	Businessperson	Business, Corporate, Financiers & Entrepreneurs	CEO of MediaCom UK
=6	Chuka Umunna	Politician	Public, Third Sector & Education	Shadow Business Secretary & Labour MP for Streatham
=6	Adam Afriyie	Politician	Public, Third Sector & Education	Conservative MP for Windsor
7	Doreen Lawrence, Baroness Lawrence, OBE	Activist	Public, Third Sector & Education	Director of the Stephen Lawrence Trust
=8	Sir Idris Elba, KBE	Actor & Producer	Media, Publishing & Entertainment	Actor
9	Sir Steve McQueen, CBE	Film Director	Media, Publishing & Entertainment	Artist & director of 12 Years a Slave
10	Dr. Maggie Aderin-Pocock, MBE	Space Scientist	Public, Third Sector & Education	Academic researcher at University College London

=== 2013 Rankings ===
The sixth annual Powerlist edition was announced in October 2012, ranking Britons who have "the ability to alter events and change lives in a positive way" and 20,000 hard copies were distributed to schools across the UK.

Rank	Individual	Occupation	Category	Notability
1	Sir David Adjaye, OBE	Architect	Arts, Fashion & design	Designer of the National Museum of African American History in Washington, DC
2	Dame Pat McGrath	Make-up Artist	Arts, Fashion & design	Founder of Pat McGrath Labs
3	Sir Mo Farah, MBE	Athlete	Sports	Olympic Gold Medalist
4	Sir Ken Olisa, OBE	Businessperson & Philanthropist	Business, Corporate, Financiers & Entrepreneurs	Chair of Restoration Partners & Non-executive chairman of Thomson Reuters
5	Sir Damon Buffini	Businessperson & Philanthropist	Business, Corporate, Financiers & Entrepreneurs	Private equity baron at Permira
6	Dr. Sandie Okoro	Lawyer	Business, Corporate, Financiers & Entrepreneurs	Global General Counsel of Barings LLC
7	Karen Blackett, OBE	Businessperson	Business, Corporate, Financiers & Entrepreneurs	CEO of MediaCom UK
8	Chuka Umunna	Politician	Public, Third Sector & Education	Shadow Business Secretary & Labour MP for Streatham
9	John Sentamu, Baron Sentamu	Religious Leader	Public, Third Sector & Education	Archbishop of York
10	Sir Idris Elba, KBE	Actor & Producer	Media, Publishing & Entertainment	Actor

=== 2012 Rankings ===
The 2012 Powerlist edition was announced in November 2011, and the judging panel was chaired by Baroness Amos. For the second year running, it ranked Tidjane Thiam, CEO of FTSE 100 company Prudential plc, as number one and Dr Mo Ibrahim and Dame Vivian Hunt in second and third place respectively.

Rank	Individual	Occupation	Category	Notability
1	Tidjane Thiam	Businessperson	Business, Corporate, Financiers & Entrepreneurs	CEO of Prudential plc
2	Dr. Mo Ibrahim	Businessperson	Business, Corporate, Financiers & Entrepreneurs	Chairman & Founder of Mo Ibrahim Foundation
3	Dame Vivian Hunt	Businessperson	Business, Corporate, Financiers & Entrepreneurs	Director at McKinsey & Company
4	Sir David Adjaye, OBE	Architect	Arts, Fashion & design	Designer of the National Museum of African American History in Washington, DC
5	Dr. Yvonne Greenstreet	Doctor & Businessperson	Science, Medicine and engineering	Senior VP of medicines development at Pfizer
6	Sir Damon Buffini	Businessperson & Philanthropist	Business, Corporate, Financiers & Entrepreneurs	Private equity baron at Permira
7	Sir Ken Olisa, OBE	Businessperson & Philanthropist	Business, Corporate, Financiers & Entrepreneurs	Chair of Thomson Reuters & The Powerlist Foundation
8	Dr. Sandie Okoro	Lawyer	Business, Corporate, Financiers & Entrepreneurs	Global General Counsel of Barings LLC
9	Bernard Mensah	Businessperson	Business, Corporate, Financiers & Entrepreneurs	Head of emerging markets at BofA Securities
10	Sir Idris Elba, KBE	Actor & Producer	Media, Publishing & Entertainment	Actor

=== 2011 Powerlist ===
The 2011 Powerlist had a panel including Baroness Amos and Kwame Kwei-Armah who ranked Tidjane Thiam, CEO of FTSE 100 company Prudential plc first, with Diane Abbott MP ranking ninth.

Rank	Individual	Occupation	Category	Notability
1	Tidjane Thiam	Businessperson	Business, Corporate, Financiers & Entrepreneurs	CEO of Prudential plc
2	Dr Mo Ibrahim	Businessperson	Business, Corporate, Financiers & Entrepreneurs	Chairman & Founder of Mo Ibrahim Foundation
=3	Dame Vivian Hunt	Businessperson	Business, Corporate, Financiers & Entrepreneurs	Director at McKinsey & Company
=3	Trevor Faure	Lawyer	Business, Corporate, Financiers & Entrepreneurs	Global General Counsel, Ernst & Young
4	Sir Ken Olisa, OBE	Businessperson	Business, Corporate, Financiers & Entrepreneurs	CEO of Restoration Partners, non-executive director of Thomson Reuters and ENRC
5	Sir Damon Buffini	Businessperson & Philanthropist	Business, Corporate, Financiers & Entrepreneurs	Private equity baron at Permira
6	Sir David Adjaye, OBE	Architect	Arts, Fashion & design	Lead architect of the Smithsonian National Museum of African American History and Culture
7	Courtenay Griffiths QC	Barrister	Politics, Law and Religion	Barrister
8	Tandy Anderson	Businessperson	Business, Corporate, Financiers & Entrepreneurs	Co-founder of Select Model Management
9	Diane Abbott, MP	Politician	Politics, Law and Religion	Shadow Minister for Public Health and Labour MP for Hackney North and Stoke Newington
10	Lewis Hamilton, MBE	Formula 1 Driver	Sport	First black Formula One Word Champion

Others listed included the financier Donna St Hill, the peer Victor Adebowale, Baron Adebowale, the judge Dame Linda Dobbs, the pharmaceutical executive Yvonne Greenstreet, the investor Tsega Gebreyes, the make-up artist Dame Pat McGarth, the strategy consultant Dame Vivian Hunt, the venture capitalist Wol Kolade and CPS Chief Inspector Mike Fuller.

=== 2010 Powerlist ===
The 2010 Powerlist was released in September 2009 and marked the beginning of the annual list being published in the prior Autumn. The launch took place in the Cabinet room at 10 Downing Street and now included men and women in a single table.

Rank	Individual	Occupation	Category	Notability
1	Baroness Scotland	Attorney General	Politics, Law and Religion	First female & black person to be Attorney General for England and Wales
2	Tidjane Thiam	Businessperson	Business, Corporate, Financiers & Entrepreneurs	CEO of Prudential plc
3	Dr Mo Ibrahim	Businessperson & Philanthropist	Business, Corporate, Financiers & Entrepreneurs	Chairman & Founder of Mo Ibrahim Foundation
4	Sir Damon Buffini	Businessperson & Philanthropist	Business, Corporate, Financiers & Entrepreneurs	Private equity baron at Permira
5	Sir Ken Olisa, OBE	Businessperson	Business, Corporate, Financiers & Entrepreneurs	Chair of Restoration Partners, non-executive director of Thomson Reuters and Eurasian Natural Resources Corporation
6	Trevor Faure	Lawyer	Business, Corporate, Financiers & Entrepreneurs	Global Head of Legal, Ernst & Young
7	Claire Ighodaro, CBE	Businessperson	Business, Corporate, Financiers & Entrepreneurs	Independent director
8	Dame Vivian Hunt	Businessperson	Business, Corporate, Financiers & Entrepreneurs	Director at McKinsey & Company
9	Lord Sentamu	Religious Leader	Public, Third Sector & Education	Archbishop of York
10	Tsega Gebreyes	Businessperson	Business, Corporate, Financiers & Entrepreneurs	Chair of Satya Capital

== 2000s ==
Prior to 2010, the Powerlist had a different format and was published in conjunction with weekly newspaper the New Nation. During the Powerlist's first few years, separate top 10 rankings were produced for both female and male candidates. In addition, top-ranking individuals were not promoted to the "Hall of Fame", meaning they could continue to be ranked the following year.

=== 2008 Powerlist ===
The 2008 Powerlist was compiled of 50 men and 50 women chosen by a judging panel that included Baroness Amos and Kwame Kwei-Armah. It was published in October 2008 by Powerful Media, sponsored by JP Morgan, and was the first annual powerlist report. Copies were sold in store and sent to the UK's 1000 largest companies, with a reception being held at the Foreign Office to celebrate those on the list. To qualify, each entrant had to be a British citizen or based in Britain.

==== Top 10 Men ====
Rank	Individual	Occupation	Category	Notability
1	Dr. Mo Ibrahim	Businessperson & Philanthropist	Business, Corporate, Financiers & Entrepreneurs	Chairman & founder of Mo Ibrahim Foundation
2	Tidjane Thiam	Businessperson	Business, Corporate, Financiers & Entrepreneurs	CEO of Prudential plc
3	Sir Damon Buffini	Businessperson & Philanthropist	Business, Corporate, Financiers & Entrepreneurs	Private equity baron at Permira
4	John Sentamu, Baron Sentamu	Religious Leader	Public, Third Sector & Education	Archbishop of York
5	Trevor Phillips	Politician	Politics, Law and Religion	Chairman of the Commission for Equality and Human Rights
6	David Lammy, MP	Politician	Politics, Law and Religion	Minister for Skills & Labour MP
7	Rio Ferdinand, OBE	Footballer	Sport	Professional footballer for Manchester United and the England national football team
8	Sir Ken Olisa, OBE	Businessperson	Business, Corporate, Financiers & Entrepreneurs	Director of Eurasian Natural Resources Corporation
9	Sir David Adjaye, OBE	Architect	Arts, Fashion & design	Designer of the Museum of Contemporary Art Denver
10	Daniel Alexander QC	Barrister	Politics, Law and Religion	Barrister

==== Top 10 Women ====
Rank	Individual	Occupation	Category	Notability
1	Baroness Scotland	Attorney General	Politics, Law and Religion	First female & black person to be Attorney General for England and Wales
2	Claire Ighodaro, CBE	Businessperson	Business, Corporate, Financiers & Entrepreneurs	Independent director
3	Michelle Ogundehin	Editor	Media, Publishing and Entertainment	Editor-in-Chief of Elle Decoration
4	Dame Vivian Hunt	Businessperson	Business, Corporate, Financiers & Entrepreneurs	Director at McKinsey & Company
5	Dame Pat McGrath	Make-up Artist	Arts, Fashion & design	Founder of Pat McGrath Labs
6	Carol Lake	Businessperson	Business, Corporate, Financiers & Entrepreneurs	Managing director and co-head of marketing at JP Morgan
7	Diane Abbott, MP	Politician	Politics, Law and Religion	First black female MP, Labour MP for Hackney North & Stoke Newington
8	Tandy Anderson	Businessperson	Business, Corporate, Financiers & Entrepreneurs	Co-founder of Select Model Management
9	Sonita Alleyne, OBE	Businessperson	Media, Publishing and Entertainment	Director of Somethin' Else
10	Abigail Blackburn	Editor	Media, Publishing and Entertainment	Editor of NOW magazine

=== 2007 Powerlist ===
The first edition of the Powerlist was compiled after six months of research and debate where 400 people of influence were whittled down to 50 women and 50 men, then ranked into respective top tens and announced in August 2007.

==== Top 10 Men ====
Rank	Individual	Occupation	Category	Notability
1	Sir Damon Buffini	Businessperson & Philanthropist	Business, Corporate, Financiers & Entrepreneurs	Private equity baron at Permira
2	Dr. Mo Ibrahim	Businessperson	Business, Corporate, Financiers & Entrepreneurs	Chairman & founder of Mo Ibrahim Foundation
3	Michael Prest	Businessperson	Business, Corporate, Financiers & Entrepreneurs	Oil tycoon
4	Tidjane Thiam	Businessperson	Business, Corporate, Financiers & Entrepreneurs	CEO of Prudential plc
5	Stanley Musesengwa	Businessperson	Business, Corporate, Financiers & Entrepreneurs	CEO of Tate & Lyle
6	Trevor Faure	Lawyer	Business, Corporate, Financiers & Entrepreneurs	VP & General Counsel of Tyco International
7	Lord Sentamu	Religious Leader	Public, Third Sector & Education	Archbishop of York
8	Lewis Hamilton & Anthony Hamilton	Formula 1 Driver & Manager	Sport	First black Formula One driver
9	David Lammy, MP	Politician	Politics, Law and Religion	Minister for Skills & Labour Member of Parliament
10	Lee Jasper	Civil Servant	Politics, Law and Religion	Senior Policy Advisor on Equalities to the Mayor of London

==== Top 10 Women ====
Rank	Individual	Occupation	Category	Notability
1	Baroness Scotland	Attorney General	Politics, Law and Religion	First female & black person to be Attorney General for England and Wales
2	Baroness Amos	Labour Peer	Politics, Law and Religion	First black female Leader of the House of Lords, cabinet minister and joint-first black woman peer
3	Dame Heather Rabbatts	Businessperson	Business, Corporate, Financiers & Entrepreneurs	Executive Chair of Millwall F.C. & Governor of London School of Economics
4	Naomi Campbell	Supermodel	Arts, Fashion and design	Influential supermodel
5	Claire Ighodaro, CBE	Businessperson	Business, Corporate, Financiers & Entrepreneurs	Director of Banking Code Standards Board
6	Baroness Howells	Labour Peer	Politics, Law and Religion	First black female on Greater London Council's training board & Governor of the University of Greenwich
7	Tandy Anderson	Businessperson	Business, Corporate, Financiers & Entrepreneurs	Co-founder of Select Model Management
8	Carol Lake	Businessperson	Business, Corporate, Financiers & Entrepreneurs	Managing director and co-head of marketing at JP Morgan
9	Michelle Ogundehin	Editor	Media, Publishing and Entertainment	Editor-in-Chief of Elle Decoration
10	Sonita Alleyne, OBE	Businessperson	Media, Publishing and Entertainment	Director of Somethin' Else

== See also ==
- 100 Great Black Britons
- Black British elite
- Black British people
