= Dean Forbes =

British business executive (born 1978)

- Born: Dean Anthony Edward Forbes; 18 October 1978 (age 47); Lewisham, London, England
- Occupation: Business executive
- Employer: Forterro (2021–present)
- Known for: Information technology
- Notable work: Primavera Systems (Vice President); Oracle (Vice President); The Access Group (president)
- Title: CEO at Forterro

Dean Anthony Edward Forbes (born 18 October 1978) is a British business executive. Since February 2021, he has been chief executive officer of Forterro, a software company based in London. Prior to his appointment, he held executive positions at The Access Group, integrated travel company KDS, human resources company CoreHR, Oracle, and Primavera Systems.

Forbes was raised in a single-parent household on an estate in Lewisham, and was homeless twice as a teenager. In his early life, Forbes played for Crystal Palace FC, but was released at the age of 17. He started his career at a call centre working for Motorola in 1995. Five years later, Forbes was appointed vice president of Primavera Systems, and became very wealthy following the acquisition of Primavera by Oracle in 2009. He has since occupied executive positions elsewhere, and founded the charitable Forbes Family Group.

Forbes appeared four times consecutively on the Powerlist, an annual ranking of influential Black British people, from 2021 to 2024. In the 2025 list, Forbes was rated as the most influential Black British person in the UK by the Powerlist for the first time.

== Biography ==
=== Early life ===
Dean Anthony Edward Forbes was born on 18 October 1978, at Lewisham Hospital, and grew up in a single-parent household under the care of his mother in Lewisham. His father is Jamaican and he has two young brothers, but his Guyanese mother suffered from muscular dystrophy. As a result, Dean started to look after his younger brothers at the age of 11. Despite these obstacles to academic success, and investing time in training to become a professional footballer, Forbes still passed 10 GCSEs at School. Forbes at an early age had aspirations to be a professional football player and signed a contract with the academy at Crystal Palace. However, he faced injuries, and the club decided to release him at the age of 17. He told Business Insider that he became homeless following his release from Crystal Palace. At this time, he was in £88,000 of debt after borrowing money to maintain the appearance of a glamorous lifestyle to friends including Rio Ferdinand and other wealthy football players. He then started a job with Motorola working in a call centre, in part to clear this debt.

=== Career ===
From July 1995, Forbes worked as a sales manager at Motorola. Following this, he joined Isis Telecommunications before joining Primavera Systems in April 2000. Forbes was vice president responsible for international growth at Primavera for nine years, until the company was sold to Oracle in January 2009. After acquisition, he worked for one year at Oracle as vice president responsible for worldwide sales until February 2010.

In February 2010, Forbes joined KDS, a travel and expense management software company. He was vice president responsible for commercial operations until July 2011, when he was promoted to chief executive officer of the company. The company was acquired by Amex GBT in August 2016, but Forbes remained CEO of KDS as a subsidiary until December 2016. Subsequently, he was appointed chief executive officer at CoreHR, a human resources system company. CoreHR was acquired by The Access Group in May 2020. Forbes was president at The Access Group responsible for people division from May 2020 to February 2021, and was recruited and mentored by Chris Bayne, CEO of The Access Group.

In February 2021, Forbes joined Forterro, a Swedish software firm, where he is CEO and has an equity stake. the company focuses on providing ERP software across Europe, and is based in London. Forbes appeared four times consecutively on the Powerlist, an annual ranking of influential Black British people, in 2021, 2022, 2023, and 2024. In 2025, Forbes topped the list for the first time. Subsequently, he was invited to Downing Street to meet with the Chancellor of the Exchequer to discuss the UK economy.

== Personal life ==
Forbes is married to Danielle Forbes, and the couple have three children. One of their daughters had leukemia at the age of two, but made a full recovery, leading to Dean's interest in the African Caribbean Leukaemia Trust. Forbes is close friends with both Rio Ferdinand and Idris Elba.

== Charity ==
Forbes founded Forbes Family Group, a charity foundation. Among other achievements, in September 2024 at a gala, the group raised £400,000 for the African Caribbean Leukaemia Trust in one night.
