= School-Home Support =

British children's charity

- Founded: January 1, 1984
- Founder: Bridget Cramp
- Registration no.: 1084696
- Location: London, United Kingdom
- Coordinates: 51.5423992°N 0.0052116°E
- Region served: United Kingdom
- Key people: Jaine Stannard (Chief Executive)
- Revenue: £3.3 million
- Website: schoolhomesupport.org.uk
- Formerly called: The Langdon Park School-Home Support Service, East London Schools Fund, School-Home Support Service (UK), School Home Liaison

School-Home Support (SHS) is a British charity founded in 1984 to help disadvantaged children and young people overcome barriers to education.

The charity works with schools, local authorities and families, aiming to look "beyond the classroom" to understand and tackle low school attendance and other issues affecting children's learning. It emphasises the importance of home experience on a child's attainment at school and works to resolve issues including poverty, lack of housing, domestic violence, and substance misuse. During the 2015/16 academic year, SHS worked with over 11,000 families.

SHS is a UK registered charity, number 1084696. Its motto is "Children in school, ready to learn. Whatever it takes."

Ken Olisa, the first black Lord-Lieutenant of Greater London, and Tony Adams, former football player and captain for Arsenal and England, are patrons of the charity. Sophie Winkleman became Royal Patron in 2020.

== History ==
SHS was originally called The Langdon Park School-Home Support Service and began in Langdon Park Secondary School, in the London Borough of Tower Hamlets. The school's Education Welfare Officer, Bridget Cramp, started the service in order to "put the true interests of the child first, always". Along with Terry Farrell, Head of Year 7, and Peter Andrews, Head Teacher at Langdon Park Secondary School, she visited pupils outside of school hours and built relationships with their families, in order to understand the impact of their home lives on their school behaviour.

In 1989 the service became the East London Schools Fund and by 1994, operated in 28 schools across Tower Hamlets. In 1999, School-Home Support Service (UK) was set up with the aim to reach more children and young people. Combined with the East London Schools Fund, it delivered services in 59 primary schools and 36 secondary schools in 9 London Boroughs.

In 2003, the East London Schools Fund officially became School-Home Support UK. In 2006, it merged with a charity with similar services named School Home Liaison in order to finally become School-Home Support (SHS), operating in 97 schools.

== Services ==
SHS's services include:

- School-based practitioners, who work independently and liaise between children, their families and the school
- SHS Membership, which offers safeguarding support and supervision for pastoral teams
- Early years support and intervention, with 'Ready for School' and 'Ready for Secondary School' programmes
- City & Guilds–approved training for schools and safeguarding staff
- Corporate partnerships, with volunteering opportunities and 'aspiration sessions'
- 'Troubled Families' practitioners, who work closely with families facing multiple, complex needs, as part of the Government's 'Troubled Families' programme
