= Ric Lewis =

British businessman

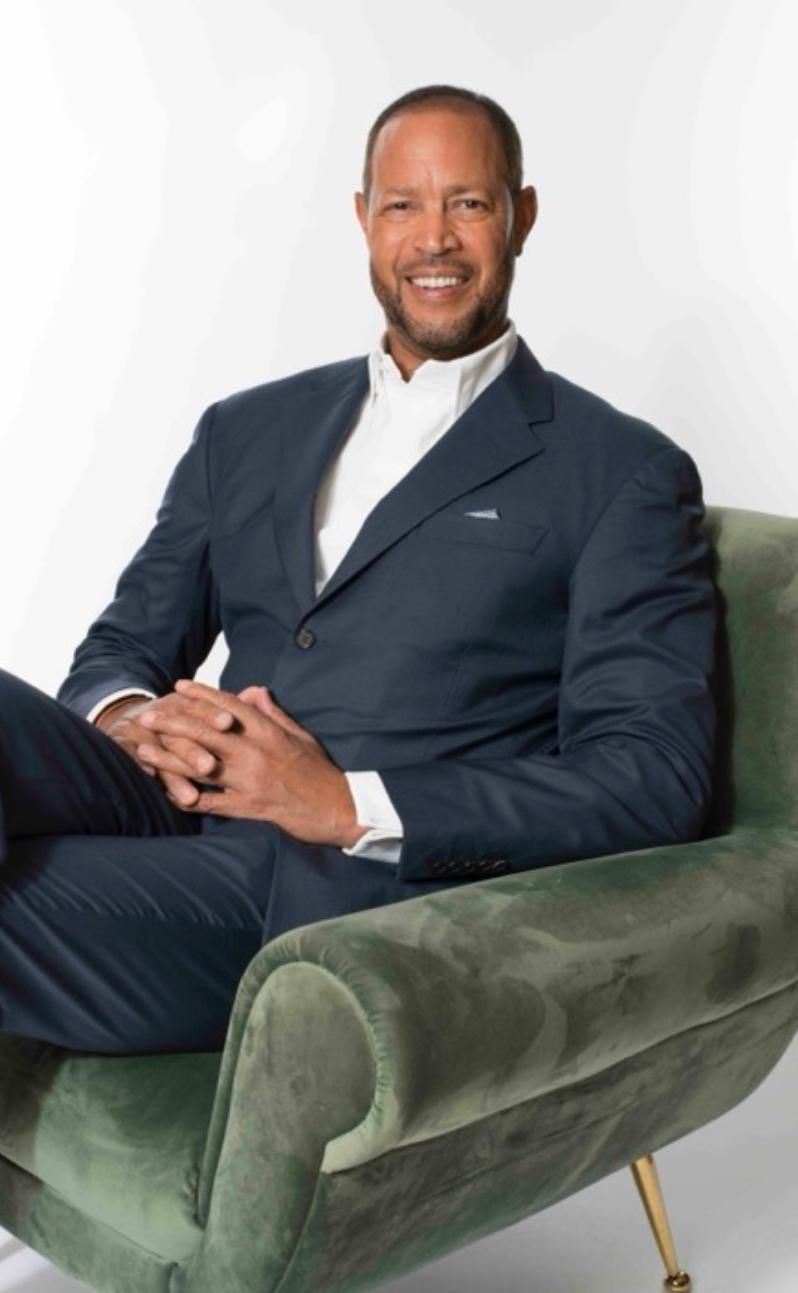
- Born: Richard Wayne Lewis; December 1962 (age 63); Salem, Massachusetts, United States
- Citizenship: Dual British & American
- Education: Dartmouth College BA, Harvard University PMD
- Occupations: Businessman and philanthropist
- Children: 2

Ric Lewis is a British-American businessman. He is a founding partner of Tristan Capital Partners, a British property investment firm, and its predecessor, Curzon Global Partners (1998–2008). He is also the founder and chairman of a registered charity, The Black Heart Foundation.

Lewis also serves on numerous corporate and community and charity boards in the UK. He ranked first in the Powerlist 2019, an annual list of the UK's most influential people with African or Afro-Caribbean heritage.

== Early life and education ==
Ric Lewis was born in Salem, Massachusetts, United States, to African American parents. He attended public high school, was class president and at 6'10" also played on the basketball team. After high school, he attended Dartmouth College to study Spanish and Economics and later Harvard Business School.

== Career ==
Lewis was a partner and senior managing director of AEW Capital Management, a Boston investment management business, where he led the company’s expansion into Europe and moved to London in 1998.

After emigrating to the United Kingdom to found Curzon Global Partners, a property investment company that was a part of AEW he left AEW to become a founding partner of another London property investment company, Tristan Capital Partners, in 2009. By 2019 Tristan Capital Partners was the largest black-owned business in the UK, with over £14billion under management in the investment firm. In addition, he is a non executive director of Legal & General.

Lewis is involved in a number of advocacy and charitable projects. He is the Chairman of UK/US registered charity the Black Heart Foundation, which he founded in 2009. The Foundation is dedicated to supporting initiatives that improve educational benefits for under-resourced young people and providing opportunity to those who are otherwise denied it. Each year, it provides several educational scholarships to young people in need in the UK and abroad. At present, the Foundation has awarded over 850 Black Heart Scholarships at over 160 different, universities, schools, alternative academic institutions and training programmes throughout the UK and US. In addition, he is a trustee of the Royal National Children's Foundation. He was governor of Ark King Solomon Academy, and a patron of Eastside Young Leaders Academy. He was a trustee of Imperial College London, Teach First and of International Inspiration, and a director of London First and the London Regional Council of The Prince’s Trust. In addition, he is a trustee and board member of The Earthshot Prize.

== Other positions ==
In the United States he is a trustee of Dartmouth College and he was on the board of visitors for the Belfer Center for Science and International Affairs at Harvard University. He served as Board of Visitors, Rockefeller Center for International and Public Policy, Dartmouth College; Board Director, Boys & Girls Club of Boston; Board Director, I Have a Dream, Boston; Board Director, International House of Blues Foundation; Trustee, Hyams Foundation Inc.; Overseer, The Judge Baker Children’s Center, Boston and Non-Executive Director, Innovision LLC

He was a director of Grassroot Soccer in South Africa, and of the Smurfit School of Business of University College Dublin.

In March 2025, the House of Commons' Treasury Committee approved Lewis' appointment as the Chair of the Crown Estate. He had been the government's preferred candidate.

As of October, 2020, Lewis was taking part in a 12-week financial podcast, 'The Mentor', where he had teamed up with David Whitely to mentor three young people. Each of the young people gets £5000 and an hour per week with Lewis. The Mentor is a non-profit podcast and all funds raised go to the Black Heart Foundation.

In February 2021, Lewis was awarded the Urban Land Institute (ULI) European Leader Award for his contribution to urban development and real estate, along with his civic and social endeavours as part of the Black Heart Foundation.

== Recognition ==
- Powerlist 2019 - First Place, in addition, Lewis was ranked second in the Powerlist 2018 and 2017.
- 10th PERE Global Awards, Industry Figure of the Year: Europe.
- Boston Jaycees Ten Outstanding Young Leaders Award (1998).
- 2021 Urban Land Institute (ULI) European Leader Award.
