= Afua Kyei =

British central banker (born 1982)

Afua Serwah Kyei (born 15 October 1982) is a British financial executive who has been chief financial officer (CFO) of the Bank of England since 2019.

== Biography ==
Kyei was born in London to Ghanaian parents. She attended Old Palace School, a private secondary school for girls in Croydon. She earned her bachelor's and master's degrees in chemistry from Somerville College, Oxford, and then worked as a junior researcher in organic chemistry at Princeton University. She trained as a chartered accountant at Ernst & Young in London. She is married and has four children.

Between 2012 and 2019 she was Chief Financial Officer Mortgages at Barclays Bank LLC. In January 2023, Kyei was listed among the 100 most reputable Africans. Kyei was named as the most influential black person in the UK on the 2026 Powerlist.

In 2023, she was elected as Honorary Fellow of Somerville College, Oxford.
