= Claire Ighodaro =

Nigerian chartered management accountant

Claire Ighodaro CBE
- Born: 1953 (age 72–73); London, England
- Education: Queens College, Lagos; St Anne's School, Ibadan
- Alma mater: University of Lagos (BSc)
- Occupation: Chartered Management Accountant
- Known for: First female President of CIMA
- Title: Chair, KPMG UK Audit Board
- Awards: CBE (2008); Honorary Doctorate, Open University (2015)

Claire Ighodaro CBE is a British Nigerian chartered management accountant. She was the first female president of the Chartered Institute of Management Accountants (CIMA) and previously the financial director of BT Broadband. Ighodaro is presently a non-executive director of Flood Re, XL Catlin Insurance Company UK Limited, and the Pennon Group PLC. She is a trustee of the British Council and an independent board member of the UK Trade & Investment Executive Board. She is a board member and Audit Committee Chair of Lloyd's of London and a non-executive director and Governance Committee Chair of Merrill Lynch. In 2008, she was awarded with a Commander of the Most Excellent Order of the British Empire (CBE) for services to business.

== Education and early career ==
Ighodaro studied at Queens College Yaba Lagos Nigeria from 1964 to 1968, and at St Anne's School Ibadan from 1969 to 1970. She studied accounting at the University of Lagos. She started her career at Otis Elevators in London in 1979. In 1984, she moved to British Telecom to work as a Management and Development Accountant. She was subsequently promoted to senior project manager in 1988, where she led the development of one of the first handheld job-reporting systems for field engineers. In 2000, Ighodaro was made financial controller of British Telecom Open world, the United Kingdom's first mass-market broadband internet launch, and of portal, channel and interactive TV development.

== Non-executive directorships and advisory roles ==
Since becoming Chartered Institute of Management Accountants first female president, and Chair of the executive board, Ighodaro has served on a variety of directorships and advisory positions. At Merrill Lynch, she served as a non-executive director and chair of the governance committee. At the University of Surrey, she served as a council member and audit committee member. She served as a non-executive director and chair, audit committee of Lloyd's of London. She is also a board member of the International Ethics Standards Board for Accountants.

Ighodaro is a member of the FCO Diplomatic Excellence External Panel and Iddas (Savile Group PLC). At Lending Standards Board, she serves as a non-executive director and chair of the audit committee. She is also a council member and chair of the audit committee of The Open University. She is a board member and chair, audit committee of The British Council and the chair of the London Learning and Skills Council. Ighadaro is a non-executive board member and chair, audit committee of the UK Trade & Investment.

== Honors and awards ==
In 2007, Ighodaro was ranked 5th in the New Nation's power list of 100 leading black role models. In 2008, she was awarded a CBE for services in business. In 2015, Ighodaro was granted a 'doctor of the university' from Open University.

== Personal life ==
Ighodaro is married with three children.
