= Kevin Fenton =

British epidemiologist

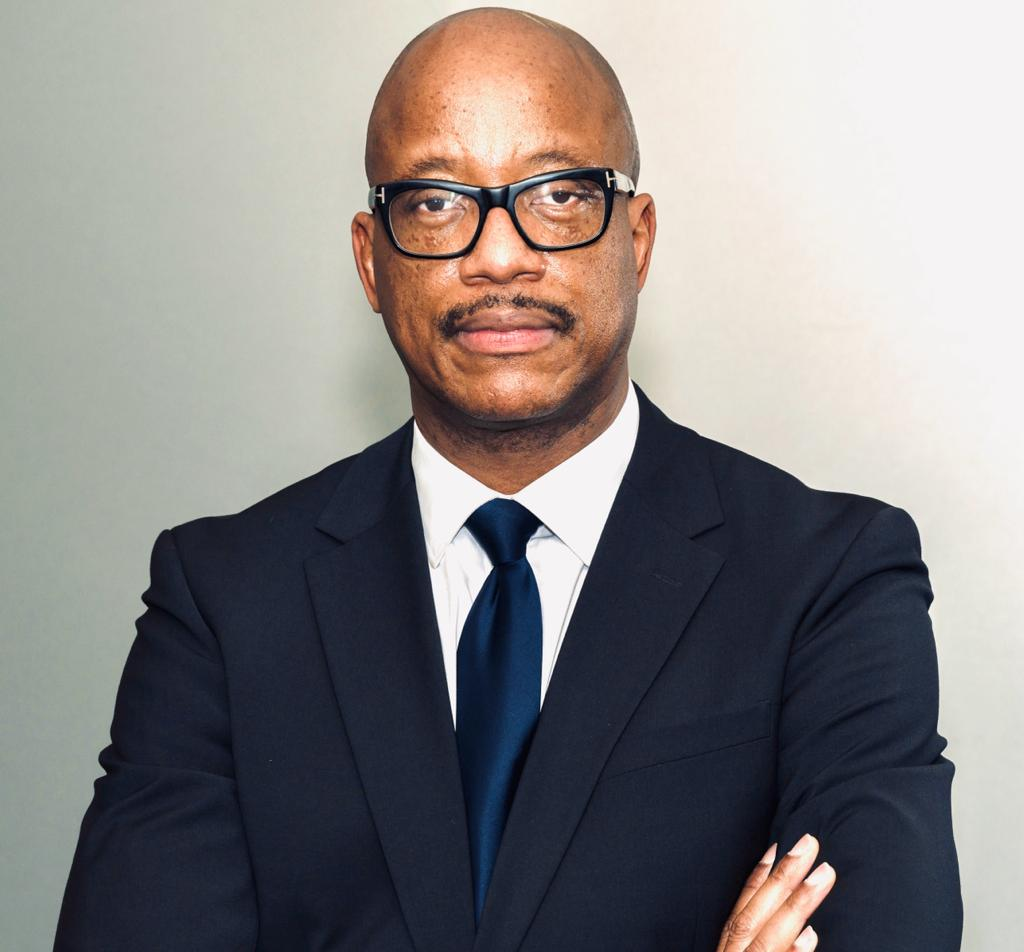
- Born: 19 December 1966 (age 59); Glasgow, Scotland
- Education: University of the West Indies; London School of Hygiene & Tropical Medicine; University College London
- Scientific career
- Workplaces: Health Protection Agency; Centers for Disease Control and Prevention
- Thesis: Race, ethnicity and the epidemiology of sexually transmitted infections (2005)

Kevin Andrew Fenton (born 19 December 1966) is a public health physician and infectious disease epidemiologist. He is the London regional director at Office for Health Improvement and Disparities, regional public health director at NHS London and the statutory health advisor to the mayor of London, Sadiq Khan. He is a past president of the United Kingdom Faculty of Public Health and holds honorary professorships with the University College London and London School of Hygiene and Tropical Medicine. He is the 2024/25 president of the British Science Association.

He was formerly national director for health and wellbeing at Public Health England (2012-2017) and director of the United States National Center for HIV/AIDS, Viral Hepatitis, STD, and TB Prevention, part of the Centers for Disease Control and Prevention (2005-2012).

== Early life and education ==
Fenton was born in Glasgow, Scotland, to Sydney and Carmen Fenton. He grew up in Jamaica, where his father was head of the science department at Excelsior High School and his mother was a nurse at the hospital of the University of the West Indies (UWI). Fenton attended Wolmer's Boys' School in Kingston where he completed O-Levels and A-Levels before graduating. He then went on to attend The UWI, initially as a computer science major, but later graduated with an MD from the UWI Medical School, where he was elected class president for the 1985–86 school year. He completed residencies at Cornwall Regional Hospital in Montego Bay and University College Hospital in Kingston.

== Career ==
Working as a government doctor in Lucea, Jamaica, caused Fenton to concentrate on public health. He earned an MPH from the London School of Hygiene & Tropical Medicine in 1992 and a doctorate in epidemiology from University College London. Fenton became a senior lecturer on HIV epidemiology and honorary consultant epidemiologist at the Communicable Disease Surveillance Centre of the UK's National Health Service and a lead researcher on the second National Survey of Sexual Attitudes and Lifestyles in 2000 and 2001. In 2002 he became director of the centre's Health Protection Agency HIV and Sexually Transmitted Infections Department.

Fenton joined the Centers for Disease Control and Prevention in 2005, initially as director of the National Syphilis Elimination Effort, then director of the National Center for HIV, STD, and TB Prevention, renamed the National Center for HIV/AIDS, Viral Hepatitis, STD, and TB Prevention in 2007.

In 2011 and 2012, Fenton appeared on The Root's "The Root 100" list of "black achievers and influencers between the ages of 25 and 45".

Fenton left CDC, and the US, in 2012 to join the new English national public health body, Public Health England, as head of its directorate of health improvement and population healthcare, renamed health and wellbeing shortly before April 2013's official commencement of the organisation. As of 2015, Fenton was paid a salary of between £175,000 and £179,999 by the department, making him one of the 328 most highly paid people in the British public sector at that time.

In February 2017, he was announced as Southwark Council's new director of health and wellbeing, working on secondment from Public Health England. That same year he received an honorary doctorate in health from the University of Bath.

As of 2020, Fenton is Public Health England's regional director of public health for London. His work in this role combatting the COVID-19 pandemic was recognised by ranking second in the 2021 edition of the annual Powerlist of the most influential Black Britons. Fenton's work during the pandemic focused on supporting hard-hit BAME communities, including two reports highlighting the health inequalities faced by minority British people.

Fenton was appointed Commander of the Order of the British Empire (CBE) in the 2022 New Year Honours for services to public health.
