= Primavera (software) =

Enterprise project portfolio management software

Primavera is an enterprise project portfolio management software. It includes project management, scheduling, risk analysis, opportunity management, resource management, collaboration and control capabilities, and integrates with other enterprise software such as Oracle and SAP’s ERP systems. Primavera was launched in 1983 by Primavera Systems Inc. which was acquired by Oracle Corporation in 2008.

== History ==
=== Founders ===
Primavera was founded in the spring of 1983 by Joel Koppelman and Dick Faris. It was headquartered at Three Bala Plaza West in Bala Cynwyd Pennsylvania, USA.

=== Products and versions ===
The company produced many products over the years including:

- Finest Hour
- Parade
- Primavera Project Planner (P3)
- Monte Carlo
- SureTrak
- Expedition - which was rebranded Contract Manager
- P3e and TeamPlay - which were rebranded as P6

As of 2008 Primavera Systems supported long-established products - P3 and SureTrak - and the newer P6 version. The long-standing P3 product in its various forms was used by 25% of the heavy construction industry, its predominant customer base; the next most popular software was used by 11%. Nearly 40% of general contractors with an annual revenue of $5M to $10M used Primavera P3. In comparison, the P6 version did not register in a CFMA 2008 survey of the United States construction industry. The Primavera Project Planner DOS core launched in 1983 and the P3 Windows interface launched in 1994.

With the acquisition of Eagle Ray, Primavera launched P3e version 1.0 in 1999 as an enterprise version of their very successful P3 planning tool. P3e and later P6 was not an evolution of the older P3 product. P3e (aka P6) was built from the ground-up as an enterprise-class client-server project planning tool.

After a 27-year version life, Oracle ceased sales of the P3 and SureTrak versions on December 31, 2010.

In 2012, Primavera P6 EPPM Upgrade Release 8.2 added capabilities for governance, project-team participation, and project visibility. Mobile PPM was introduced through Primavera’s P6 Team Member for iPhone and Team Member Web Interface, to streamline communications between project team members in the field and in the office. In addition, Primavera P6 Analytics Release 2.0 gained new enterprise-reporting tools and dashboards for monitoring and analyzing performance data, including geospatial analysis. Organizations could also investigate comparative trends and cause-and-effect in multiple projects with Primavera Contract Management Release 14 as it included the report-writing capabilities of Oracle Business Intelligence Publisher.

In April 2013, Oracle Corporation announced the release of version 8.4 of Primavera P6 Enterprise Project Portfolio Management. This version incorporated material from Oracle's acquisitions of Skire and Instantis in 2012.

== Use in ransomware ==
Primavera has been targeted by expert extortionists as a way to efficiently compromise digital business assets through fixable software security flaws, leading to a higher return in the usage of ransomware. A security patch is available for most of such exploits.

== See also ==
- Project Portfolio Management
- List of acquisitions by Oracle
