= List of Today programme guest editors =

The Today programme on BBC Radio 4 in the UK hands over the editorship of the flagship programme to notable outsiders for the week between Christmas and New Year. This is the full list of the individuals involved since the practice was started in 2003 by Peter Hanington.

2003 guest editors:

- Monica Ali
- Norman Tebbit
- Thom Yorke
- Gillian Reynolds
- Stephen Hawking

2004 guest editors:

- Bono
- Richard Branson
- Anthony Minghella
- Sarah Ferguson, Duchess of York
- Onora O'Neill, Baroness O'Neill of Bengarve

2005 guest editors:

- David Blunkett
- Anna Ford
- Queen Noor of Jordan
- Steve Chandra Savale, member of the band Asian Dub Foundation
- Sir John Bond, Chairman of HSBC

2006 guest editors:

- Yoko Ono
- Sir Clive Woodward
- Zac Goldsmith
- Rowan Williams
- Allan Leighton

2007 Guest Editors

- Stella Rimington
- Damon Albarn
- Peter Hennessy
- Sir Martin Evans
- Richard Lewis, Samantha Gainard and Paul Amphlett of Dyfed-Powys Police as nominated by Today Programme Listeners

2008 Guest Editors

- Zadie Smith
- Cardinal Cormac Murphy-O'Connor
- Jarvis Cocker
- Sir Win Bischoff
- Zaha Hadid

2009 Guest Editors

- Martin Rees
- David Hockney
- Tony Adams
- PD James
- Robert Wyatt
- Shirley Williams

2010 Guest Editors

- Diana Athill
- Colin Firth
- Sam Taylor Wood
- Richard Ingrams
- Dame Clara Furse

2011 Guest Editors

- Sebastian Coe
- Mo Ibrahim
- Tracey Emin
- Sir Victor Blank
- Baroness Boothroyd
- Stewart Lee

2012 Guest Editors

- Mass Observation
- Sir Paul Nurse
- Melinda Gates
- Dame Ann Leslie
- Benjamin Zephaniah
- Al Murray

2013 Guest Editors

- Sir Tim Berners Lee
- Michael Palin
- Eliza Manningham Buller
- Antony Jenkins
- PJ Harvey

2014 Guest Editors

- John Bercow
- Tracey Thorn
- Mervyn King, Baron King of Lothbury
- Lenny Henry
- Elizabeth Butler-Sloss, Baroness Butler-Sloss

2015 Guest Editors

- Michael Sheen
- Sir Bradley Wiggins
- Miriam González Durántez
- David Adjaye
- Baroness Jane Campbell
- Lord Browne

2016 Guest Editors

- Nicola Adams
- Carey Mulligan
- Helena Morrissey
- Sally Davies
- John Shields, a member of the programme's staff, edited a broadcast from Hull, looking forward to Hull UK City of Culture 2017

2017 Guest Editors

- Tamara Rojo
- Prince Harry
- Ben Okri
- Baroness Trumpington
- AI Robot

2018 Guest Editors

- David Dimbleby
- Kamila Shamsie
- Martha Lane Fox
- Angelina Jolie
- Chidera Eggerue
- Andrew Roberts
- Outer Space

2019 guest editors:

- Grayson Perry
- Brenda Hale
- Greta Thunberg
- George the Poet
- Charles Moore

2020 Guest Editors

- Lewis Hamilton
- Prue Leith
- Margaret Atwood
- Evan Spiegel
- Sir Jeremy Farrar
- Reverend Rose Hudson-Wilkin

2021 Guest Editors

- Raheem Sterling
- General Sir Nick Carter
- Mina Smallman
- James Rebanks
- Dr Jane Goodall
- Jacky Wright
- Lord Dobbs

2022 Guest Editors

- Ian Botham
- Jamie Oliver
- Nazanin Zaghari-Ratcliffe
- Björn Ulvaeus
- Sir Jeremy Fleming
- Anne-Marie Imafidon
- Dame Sharon White

2023 Guest Editors

- Andrew Malkinson
- Ellie Goulding
- Dame Emma Walmsley
- Hanif Kureishi
- James May
- Jason Arday
- Nicola Fox

== 2024 ==
- Frank Cottrell-Boyce 24th December 2025
- Dwayne Fields 26th December 2025
- Sir Sajid Javid 27th December 2025
- Irene Tracey 28th December 2025
- Baroness Floella Benjamin OM DBE 30th December 2025
- Dame Laura Kenny 31st December 2025

== 2025 ==
- Melvyn Bragg 24th December 2025
- James Dyson 26th December 2025
- Cate Blanchett 27th December 2025
- Mustafa Suleyman 29th December 2025
- Tom Holland 30th December 2025
- Theresa May 31st December 2025
