= Primavera Systems =

American software company

Oracle Primavera (formerly Primavera Systems, Inc)
- Industry: Computer Software; Project Portfolio Management; Enterprise Project Portfolio Management
- Founded: 1983
- Fate: Primavera Systems Inc. became Oracle Primavera when acquired by Oracle Corporation in 2008
- Headquarters: Philadelphia, PA, USA
- Website: www.oracle.com

Primavera Systems, Inc was a private company providing Project Portfolio Management (PPM) software to help project-intensive organizations identify, prioritize, and select project investments and plan, manage, and control projects and project portfolios of all sizes. On January 1, 2009 Oracle Corporation took legal ownership of Primavera.

== History of Primavera Systems, Inc ==
=== Corporate ===
Joel Koppelman, Les Seskin, and Dick Faris founded Primavera Systems, Inc. on May 1, 1983. It traded as a private company based in Pennsylvania (USA), developing software for the Project Portfolio Management market. To help expand its product capabilities, Primavera acquired Eagle Ray Software Systems in 1999, Evolve Technologies (a professional services automation vendor) in 2003, ProSight [2][3] (an IT portfolio management software vendor) in 2006, and, in the same year, Pertmaster (a project risk management software vendor).

In 2008 Oracle Corporation acquired Primavera, and turned it into its Primavera Global Business Unit (PGBU).

After a 27-year version life, Oracle ceased sales of the P3 and SureTrak versions on December 31, 2010.

In 2011, co-founder Joel Koppelman announced his retirement; Mike Sicilia, SVP and General Manager, succeeded him. Co-founder Dick Faris has retired in December 2014 as Senior Vice President, Customers.

In 2016, the Primavera Global Business Unit became Oracle Construction and Engineering Global Business Unit (CEGBU) following multiple acquisitions, including Skire (now Primavera Unifier), Instantis (Cloud based Project Portfolio Management) and Textura (a Chicago based company offering contract management and online payment tools for the construction industry). More recently Australian-based Aconex joined the Construction and Engineering family, offering project controls, collaboration, document management and BIM capabilities.

== See also ==
- Primavera (software)
- Project Portfolio Management
- Project Management
