= Servelec =

Health company in Sheffield, England

Servelec is a health informatics company headquartered in Sheffield, owned by The Access Group. The company provides software solutions to the healthcare, social care, and education sectors.

== Divisions ==
- Servelec Health and Social Care: Specialises in Electronic Patient Records (EPR), Patient Administration Systems (PAS), and products such as Rio, Oceano, and Flow.
- Servelec Education and Youth Services: Known for Synergy and Core+ software.

== Financial Performance ==
In 2016, Servelec reported a total revenue of £61.0 million, down from £63.1 million in 2015. The operating profit for 2016 was £14.6 million, compared to £16.2 million in the previous year.

== Ownership ==
In 2013 the company was floated on the stock exchange by CSE Global which had owned it since 2000 with an expected valuation of £122 million. At that time it was concentrated on software and control systems to utilities, broadcasters, lighthouses and North Sea oil rigs. It was then listed on the FTSE SmallCap Index. In January 2018 Scarlet Bidco, on behalf of Montagu Private Equity bought the Group for £223.9 million.

It bought Corelogic a social care case management software provider with more than 65,000 end users in 2014 for £23.5 million.

The company was bought by The Access Group in August 2021.

== Healthcare ==
Rio is an electronic patient record which is accessible through smartphones and tablets. This enables practitioners to access patient records remotely and in real-time.

Microtest Health's Open Evolution system is integrated with Servelec's Rio electronic patient record, which is widely used within mental health, community health and child health care settings. It plans further integration with their social care case management system, Mosaic. It also integrates with Totalmobile's mobile-based workforce software so staff can save time by accessing patient information from the electronic patient record using a smartphone or tablet.

=== United Kingdom ===
Bournewood Community and Mental Health trust deployed a Servelec system in only 8 months in 1999 – considerably quicker than was common.

University Hospitals Birmingham NHS Foundation Trust developed a new patient administration system, Oceano PAS, in a four-year partnership with the company, bringing in more than 1 million patient records, 1.8 million outpatient appointments, 248,000 inpatient movements and 3,836 clinics. It went live in August 2017 and was functional with real time clinic reporting from day one. The trust’s director of strategic operations, said the roll-out was "a phenomenal achievement". It was then made available commercially to other organisations.

Lancashire Care NHS Foundation Trust deployed a new Servelec Rio electronic patient record in March 2018.

In 2018/19 Servelec Group, acquired Careervision Holdings Limited, a provider of case management and information solutions to children and young people’s services teams.

Its Flow digital bed management solution was installed in Berkshire Healthcare NHS Foundation Trust in 2021 and integrated with the existing Rio electronic patient record.

In August 2021 it acquired social prescribing technology specialists Elemental Software.

=== Ireland ===
St Patrick's Mental Health Services installed the first mental health electronic health record in Ireland, using the company's Rio EHR in September 2017 under the internal title "eSwift", referencing both the founder of St Patricks, Jonathan Swift and the faster sharing of electronic records.

It integrates inpatient, outpatient and day patient services. It plans to incorporate an online portal allowing service users to view parts of their own health record.

The company was one of the partners in the award-winning Whiteboard Solution Project at St. Vincent's University Hospital in 2017, providing an onsite presence on the wards for four weeks from go-live.
