= Jacky Wright =

British technology executive

Jacky Wright LVO
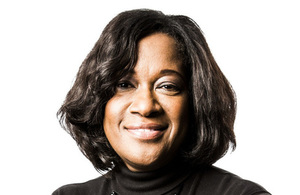
- while working for UK gov
- Born: London
- Occupations: Chief Technology and Platform Officer
- Employer(s): McKinsey & Company

Jacqueline Wright LVO is a Senior Partner and Chief Technology and Platform Officer of McKinsey & Company.

== Biography ==
Jacky Wright was born in London to Jamaican parents and grew up there in Tottenham. Her family moved to the US when she was a teenager as her father, who had worked for the Royal Air Force in the UK, believed the US provided better opportunities and role models for black people at that time. She has spent much of her career in the United States.

Wright worked at BP, General Electric, and Andersen Consulting before taking up her career at Microsoft. She served as corporate vice president for core platform engineering at Microsoft before joining HM Revenue & Customs (HMRC) on a two-year "loan arrangement" in 2017. She was Chief Digital and Information Officer at HMRC until October 2019, when she returned to Microsoft.

During her career she has advocated for diversity in technology and in the workplace and contributed to organizational initiatives on this issue. She has sat on the board of Year Up, an organisation that supports young adults in skill building, and on the Women's Innovation Council who aim to improve involvement of women in science and technology careers.

Wright was listed at number 6 in the Powerlist 2018 rankings of the most influential black people in the UK, and at number 4 in the Powerlist 2019 rankings and the Powerlist 2020 rankings.

In 2021 she was chosen by BBC Radio 4's Today programme to be one of seven guest editors during the Christmas period.

In 2022, Wright was named the United Kingdom's most influential Black person, ranking number 1 in the annual Powerlist.

The University of Bath awarded Wright an Honorary Doctorate of the University in June 2022. The award recognises Wrights' 'outstanding services to technology, and her contributions to digital inclusion'.

She was appointed Lieutenant of the Royal Victorian Order (LVO) in the 2026 Birthday Honours for services to the Royal Household.
