= Flood Re =

- Founded: 4 April 2016; 10 years ago
- Headquarters: London
- Area served: United Kingdom
- Key people: Stuart Logue (Acting CEO); Mark Hoban (First chairman of the board of Directors)
- Products: Reinsurance
- Website: floodre.co.uk

Flood Re (short for flood re-insurance) is a levy and pool system in the United Kingdom which replaced the Statement of Principles agreed between the government and insurance companies. It provides flood insurance coverage to domestic properties deemed at significant risk of flooding (this is generally defined as more than a 1.3% or 1 in 75 annual probability of flooding). It is estimated that it will ultimately cover the most at risk 2%, or 250,000 homes, though the Centre for Climate Change Economics and Policy suggest 370,000 homes are eligible.

== Development ==
In the absence of any proposals from Defra, the insurance industry developed a 'Flood Re' model with economic consultants Oxera. Flood Re, a not-for-profit scheme, is run and financed by insurers launched on 4 April 2016. It caps domestic flood insurance prices keeping insurance premiums affordable for households in high-risk areas, It also supersedes the previous Statement of Principles which was intended to expire in June 2013. During the development of Flood Re, the coverage of the Statement of Principles was initially extended until July 2013, then summer 2015, but continued until Flood Re came into force on 4 April 2016. Premiums are linked to council tax bands ensuring support is targeted at those on lower incomes.

The protection offered by the Flood Re scheme was not originally intended to be universal, but it now covers all Council Tax bands. To prevent the scheme from encouraging construction on high flood-risk land, homes built since 2009 are excluded from coverage. The industry had called on the government to help fund a reinsurance scheme in the short term, before it became self-funding. However, under a "compromise" deal announced in June 2013, it was agreed that the government would not commit public funds to Flood Re. Instead, it has agreed to step in to provide "available resources" to fund relief if the country is hit by an especially costly flood, of the magnitude that would be expected to occur once in 200 years.

Flood Re is expected to remain in place for 25 years, allowing a transition to a free market in flood insurance. It also reflects the flood risk to a property and enables homeowners in high-risk areas to implement mitigation measures during this period. As a result, insurance for the property can remain affordable after Flood Re ends.

== History (Statement of Principles) ==
A series of agreements on flood insurance have been made between governments in the UK and the insurance industry since the 1960s. These started with what is referred to as the "Gentleman's Agreement" more recently named the "Statement of Principles on the provision of flood insurance" after the year 2000. Following the serious UK flooding in 2000, which affected 10,000 properties in 700 locations and caused £1 billion of damage, the government and the Association of British Insurers drew up a statement of principles. Under the agreement ABI members agreed to continue offering insurance at existing rates to properties at high risk of flooding, if the government continued to invest in flood defences. The ABI became increasingly opposed to continuing with the Statement of Principles, as it created a two-tier insurance market. Non-members and new entrants were not obligated to insure properties in high-risk flood areas, allowing them to offer cheaper premiums than the insurers who had signed the agreement. The ABI stated in the consultation into the Statement of Principles that, "The SoP was only ever meant to be a temporary ‟sticking plaster‟" and that "New entrants to the home insurance market start from a position where they have no commitments under the agreement. This gives them a significant commercial advantage." In 2008, the UK government and the ABI agreed to revise and extend the Statement of Principles for one last five-year period.

== 'Build Back Better' ==
On 14 April 2022, Flood Re launched the world’s first Build Back Better initiative to help flood victims be more resilient to future flood events.

The new scheme will allow Flood Re to pay claims from insurers ceding to the scheme that include an amount of resilient repair up to a value of £10,000 over and above the cost of like-for-like reinstatement of actual flood damage.

The initial participating insurers include NFU Mutual, Aviva, Ageas, Lloyds Banking Group and LV= General Insurance. The grant funding is being made available because many homes flood more than once, and because the frequency is expected to increase with climate change. The funding can be used to pay for things like raising electrical sockets and white goods away from floor level, along with flood surveys, flood barriers and other property flood resilience measures.

Rebecca Pow, Flood Minister, has urged more insurers to sign up for Flood Re's Build Back Better scheme.

To launch and promote the scheme a 17-minute documentary was created. It features a mixture of notable individuals from Flood Re, Government and industry. Featured in the documentary is Rebecca Pow, Emma Howard-Boyd, Nigel Topping, Flood campaigners Simon Crowther and Mary Dhonau OBE, Professor Hannah Cloke of the University of Reading, and Paul Laidlaw of the Scottish Flood Forum. Flood Re key members Andy Bord and Mark Hoban are also featured.

Householders are advised to contact their insurer or Flood Re for more information on the scheme.

== See also ==
- United States National Flood Insurance Program
