= Tunde Ogungbesan =

- Born: May 5, 1964 (age 62); London, United Kingdom
- Education: Henley Business School, University of Lagos
- Occupation: Director

Tunde Ogungbesan (born 5 May 1964) is a diversity and inclusion and talent management executive and an executive leadership coach. He is a former director of diversity, inclusion and leadership succession at the BBC.

== Early life and education ==
Ogungbesan was born in London, UK. He grew up in Dagenham, Banbury and London and Lagos, Nigeria. He attended Igbobi College in Lagos and graduated from University of Lagos with a BSc (Hons) in zoology. He received an MBA at Henley Business School.

== Career ==
Ogungbesan started his career in the UK Civil Service and later worked for Coopers & Lybrand and the NatWest Group. In 2000, he joined Royal Dutch Shell based in London. In 2015, he was appointed as a Director at the BBC in the role of Head of Diversity, Inclusion and Leadership Succession. He is first black man to lead the Diversity and inclusion agenda at the BBC. He led the BBC's diversity and inclusion strategy for the workforce, TV, radio and digital services, on-screen, off-screen, in front of the camera, behind the camera and for onscreen portrayal and for building an inclusive culture with both staff and audiences. Ogungbesan was responsible for the BBC 2016-2020 Diversity and Inclusion strategy and the publication of landmark reports on race, gender, social inclusion, sexual orientation and disability. The reports resulted in 128 recommendations. He was also responsible for the introduction of Diversity Commissioning Code of Practice which puts diversity at the heart of the BBC's TV and Radio diversity commissioning processes and standardising the approach across all output for the first time. Before leaving BBC in 2019, Ogungbesan was responsible for the restructure of the BBC diversity organisation, splitting it into two arms: creative diversity and workforce diversity. Following his tenure at the BBC, Ogungbesan served as Executive Talent Development Adviser at Saudi Aramco in Saudi Arabia until 2024. He is currently leading the Leadership Development and Succession Planning function at the Khafji Joint Operations (KJO), a joint venture between Saudi Aramco Gulf Operations Company (AGOC) and the Kuwait Gulf Oil Company (KGOC), based in Saudi Arabia.

== Awards and honours ==
- In 2019 Tunde was listed in the 100 most influential Black people in the UK
- At the 2019 UK HR Excellence Awards, Ogungbesan's BBC team won the Diversity and Inclusion award.
