= Ken Olisa =

English businessman and philanthropist (born 1951)

Sir Ken Olisa OBE CStJ FRSA FBCS
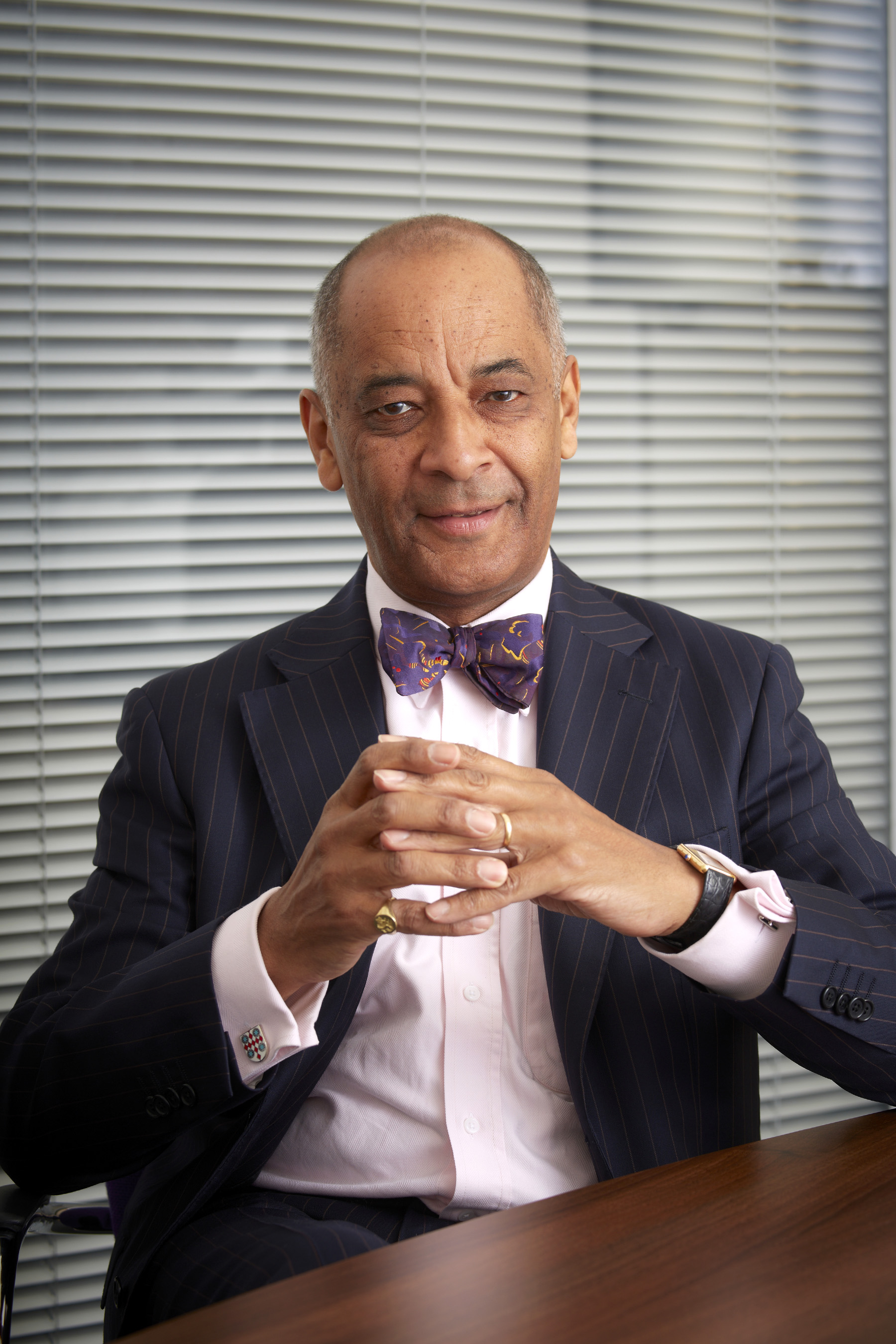

Lord-Lieutenant of Greater London
- In office 29 May 2015 – 13 October 2026
- Monarchs: Elizabeth II; Charles III
- Preceded by: Sir David Brewer
- Succeeded by: Sir Alastair King

Personal details
- Born: Kenneth Aphunezi Olisa; 13 October 1951 (age 75) Nottingham, Nottinghamshire, England
- Spouse: Julia Sherwood (m. 1976)
- Education: Fitzwilliam College, Cambridge

Sir Kenneth Aphunezi Olisa (born 13 October 1951) is a British businessman and philanthropist. He is the first mixed heritage Lord-Lieutenant of Greater London. He founded and led the AIM-listed technology merchant bank Interregnum and now leads Restoration Partners. Olisa is Past Master of the Worshipful Company of Information Technologists and has been on several boards of philanthropic, educational and regulator organisations. Olisa with his wife endowed the Olisa Library at Fitzwilliam College, Cambridge.

== Early life ==
Born in Nottingham in 1951 of a Nigerian father and a British mother, Olisa was educated at Nottingham High Pavement Grammar School and Fitzwilliam College, Cambridge, where he held a scholarship and studied Natural Sciences and then Social, Political and Management Sciences. His technology career began in the 1970s at IBM. Olisa married Julia Sherwood in Cambridge in 1976.

== Career ==
At IBM he held various posts before joining Wang Laboratories in 1981. Following a period as marketing director for Europe, VP of US Marketing and then of Worldwide Marketing based in Boston, he was appointed Senior VP and general manager of Europe, Africa and the Middle East (EAME) located in Brussels. He led the team which restored the EAME operation to profitability, following which he launched an unsuccessful management buyout resulting in his departure in 1992.

Olisa then founded Interregnum, a technology merchant bank, leading it through its early growth, its entry into and exit from a joint venture with BDO Stoy Hayward, the AIM IPO in 2000. He was also a principal advisor to, and director of, uDate.com, which was later sold to Barry Diller's USA Interactive in 2003. Olisa retired from Interregnum in 2006 and now runs Restoration Partners.

Olisa has considerable public company board-level experience on both sides of the Atlantic. He was the first British-born black man on the board of a major UK public company (Reuters) and is a former non-executive director of Thomson Reuters (where he was a member of the Audit Committee), and is also a former non-executive director and Deputy Chairman of the Institute of Directors.

He was a Director and Chairman of the Remuneration Committee of Canada's largest independent software developer, Open Text Corporation. More recently, he was a non-executive director of Eurasian Natural Resources Corporation (ENRC) from 2007 and from which he was fired for raising serious governance concerns after which he coined the expression "More Soviet than City" to describe the way he and Sir Richard Sykes had been treated. He also is on the boards of, or is an adviser to, several privately held companies including the UK's leading corporate governance advisor Independent Audit.

In 2009, The Sunday Times named him Not for Profit non-executive director of the year, and in 2016 he was voted number one in the Powerlist's Top 10 most influential British black people.

In 2012, he was appointed Chairman of the Thebes Group, an IT consultancy service provider.

In November 2017, Olisa succeeded Adedotun Sulaiman as the Chairman of Interswitch and in 2018 he joined the Board of Huawei (UK) resigning in March 2022.

In January 2023, Olisa was appointed Chairman of BusinessLDN (formerly known as London First) following the retirement of Paul Drechsler.

In 2024, he was appointed a Commissioner and Vice-Chair of the National Preparedness Commission. In 2025, he lectured at the Royal Geographical Society on the subject of national preparedness in the UK.

In March 2025, he was appointed a committee member of the Windrush Commemoration Committee.

== Charitable Work ==
Olisa is also a patron of several charities, including School-Home Support (SHS), a charity helping disadvantaged children and young people overcome barriers to education such as poverty, domestic abuse, and housing issues. He is also Patron of Fore, a philanthropy fund charity which funds scale-up initiatives for other charities. In 2019, he was appointed President of London Youth. He was Chair of welfare to work charity Shaw Trust. He also was President of Thames Reach, a charity working to shelter and resettle the homeless in London.

He is a trustee of King Charles III Charitable Fund formerly The Prince of Wales's Charitable Fund.

He is the patron of Red Trouser Day, a charity which raises awareness of colorectal cancer.

== Honours and appointments ==
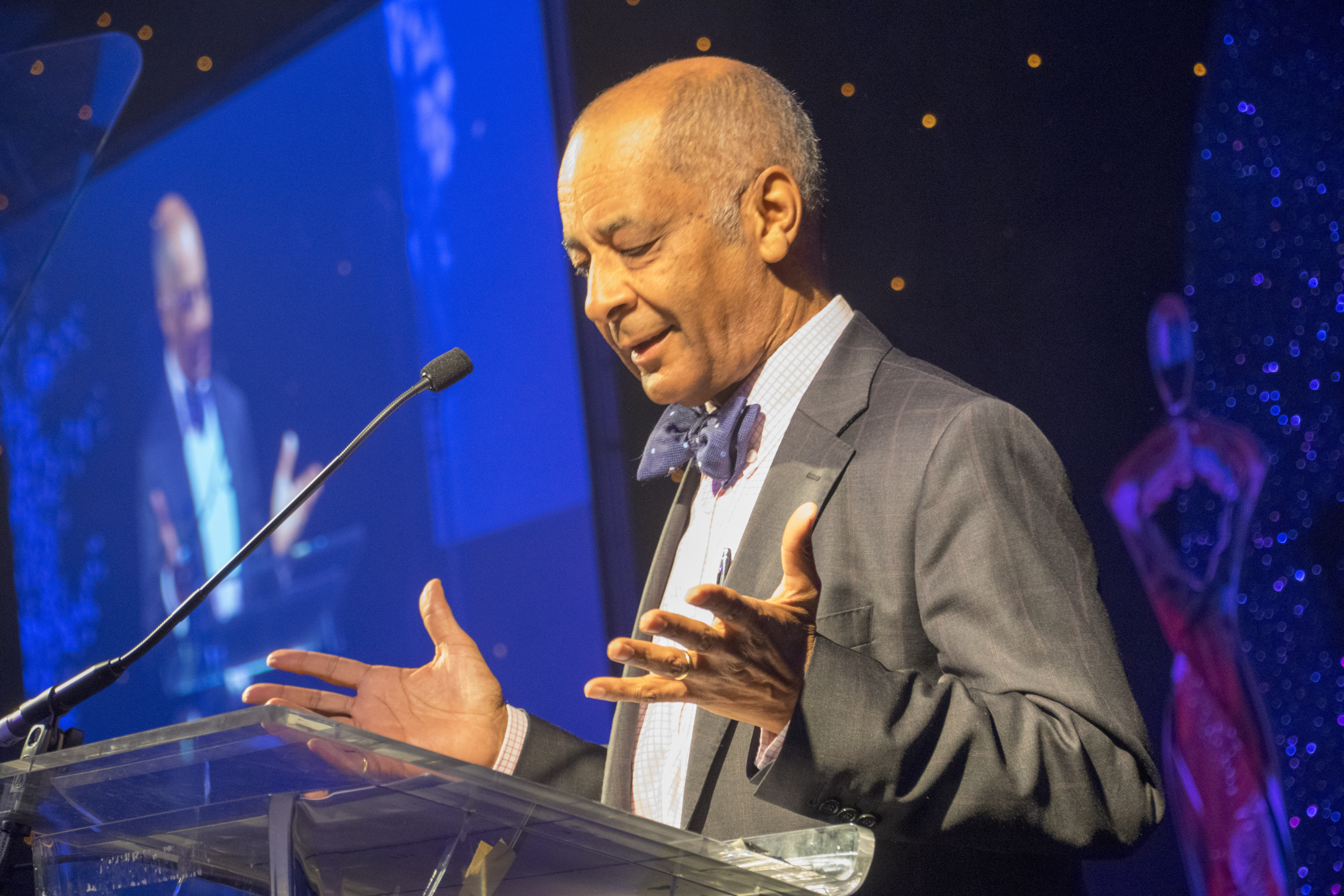
Olisa, speaking as Lord-Lieutenant of Greater London in 2018

Olisa was appointed Officer of the Order of the British Empire in the 2010 Birthday Honours for services to homeless people in London, a Commander of the Order of St John in 2017 and a Knight Bachelor in the 2018 New Year Honours for services to business and philanthropy. Olisa was appointed Lord-Lieutenant of Greater London on 29 May 2015.

In 2018, he was awarded honorary doctorates by Kingston University and by Nottingham Trent University. He received a further honorary doctorate from the University of Worcester in 2019. and from the University of Westminster in 2023.

Olisa is a Freeman of the City of London. He is Founder and Chairman of the Powerlist Foundation (now the Aleto Foundation).

He is a Fellow of the British Computer Society since 2006, as well as a Life Fellow of the Royal Society of Arts and a Life Fellow of the Institute of Directors.

His past appointments include Master of the Worshipful Company of Information Technologists, Director of the Thomson Reuters Foundation, member of the Government's Women's Enterprise Taskforce; Governor of the Peabody Trust for ten years; non-executive director of the West Lambeth NHS Trust; and a start-up regulator twice: first as an inaugural Postal Services Commissioner, from 2001 to 2004, and as a board member of the Independent Parliamentary Standards Authority, the body charged with managing the expenses, pay and pensions of members of parliament.

On 19 March 2019, Olisa greeted Queen Elizabeth II and the Duchess of Cambridge at the opening of the newly refurbished Bush House.

On 17 May 2021, Olisa became High Bailiff and Searcher of the Sanctuary at Westminster Abbey in succession to Sir Roy Strong. In that role, he took part in the 2023 Coronation. In October 2021, Olisa was elected as an Honorary Bencher of the Inner Temple.

In 2025 Olisa was elected Honorary Fellow of the Royal Academy of Engineering.

Honorary titles
| Preceded by Sir David Brewer | Lord-Lieutenant of Greater London; 2016–2026 | Succeeded by Sir Alastair King |
