= Karen Blackett =

British businesswoman (born 1971)

Karen Blackett CBE
- Born: Karen Tracey Blackett; 7 August 1971 (age 55)
- Education: University of Portsmouth
- Occupations: Chair, Chancellor of the University of Portsmouth
- Organisation: Group M
- Children: 1

Karen Tracey Blackett (born 7 August 1971) is a British Barbadian businesswoman who works in the advertising industry and is the CEO of Group M. She became the Chancellor of the University of Portsmouth in October 2017.

== Early life and education ==
Blackett was born on 7 August 1971. She grew up in Reading, Berkshire, with her mother, who was a nurse, her bus conductor father and her sister. She is originally from the Caribbean and her mother moved to London to work in the Royal Berkshire Hospital as a nurse in the 1960s. Blackett grew up around a lot of people from Barbados and other West Indian islands.

Blackett studied geography at the University of Portsmouth and graduated in 1992 with a degree.

== Work ==
After university, Blackett applied for a job advertised as a media auditor with CIA MediaNetwork. "I got through the first interview and then they asked me to give a presentation on the pros and cons of Sky TV. I didn't get that job but they suggested I talk to someone in media planning. I think it's because I was so gobby." In October 1995, she continued her career by joining Zenith Media as a senior communications planner and buyer working on the prestigious BT account. In 1995, she was promoted to the board of directors of the newly merged MediaCom and The Media Business Group Board. She was later head-hunted by The Media Business Group. In January 2003, Blackett moved from her business director role to become the marketing director of MediaCom, then, in 2008, became MediaCom's chief operation director for Europe, the Middle East and Africa. She was promoted to CEO of the UK office in January 2011.

Working with Tim Campbell MBE and The National Apprentice Service, in 2012, Blackett launched an apprenticeship scheme at Mediacom for women aged 18 to 24. In 2015, she was promoted to chair of MediaCom UK, and, in 2016, named as the company's president.

In October 2017, Blackett became the Chancellor of the University of Portsmouth. The chancellor acts as the ceremonial head of the university. In April 2026, it was announced that she would be stepping down from the post in "early 2027".

== Awards and recognition ==
In 2003 and 2005, she was voted by Management Today as one of the 35 Most Powerful Women Under 35 in the UK. Blackett has featured on the UK's 100 most influential black women five times, and was appointed an Officer of the Order of the British Empire (OBE) in the 2014 Birthday Honours for services to the media communications industry.

Blackett was the first businesswoman to top the Powerlist in 2015. She was on the 2015 BBC Radio 4 Woman's Hour Power List of The Top Ten Influencers.

== Personal life ==
Blackett is a single mother to Isaac, born 2010, and lives in Chiswick.

Blackett has also worked with a life coach for more than ten years and this, she claimed in an interview, has helped her both professionally and personally.
