= Sandie Okoro =

British lawyer (born 1964)

Sandie Okoro OBE
- Born: 1964 (age 61–62); London, England, United Kingdom
- Education: University of Birmingham; Inns of Court School of Law
- Occupation: Lawyer

Sandie Okoro OBE (born 1964) is a British lawyer who served as general counsel of Standard Chartered Bank, until 2024 and Chancellor of the University of Birmingham.

She previously served as senior vice-president and general counsel at the World Bank Group. She has previously been general counsel at Barings Asset Management, and head of legal at Schroders Investment Management International.

== Early life ==
Okoro was born in Fulham, London, in 1964, and grew up in nearby Balham. Her father was a teacher from Nigeria, and her mother a nurse from Trinidad. At the age of nine she decided she wanted to become a judge: she was influenced by the television courtroom drama series Crown Court, and was undeterred by a school teacher, asking the class their chosen careers, who said: "Sandie, little black girls from Balham don't become judges."

Okoro attended Putney High School and then studied law and politics at the University of Birmingham. After university, she studied at the Inns of Court School of Law, now part of City, University of London, and joined Lincoln's Inn, qualifying as a barrister in 1988. In a change of course, she re-qualified as a solicitor and in 1990 joined Schroders as head of its trusts team.

== Career ==
Okoro worked at Schroders from 1990 to April 2007, rising to be head of legal for corporate services, and then joined Barings as its global general counsel. After seven years at Barings she moved to become global general counsel at HSBC Global Asset Management.

In November 2016, she was appointed senior vice-president and general counsel for the World Bank Group.

Okoro has been involved with organisations including the Black British Business Awards, the Law Society's Diversity Access Scheme, and International Lawyers for Africa (ILFA), of which she was president in 2014.

In July 2024, she was appointed Chancellor of the University of Birmingham, of which she is an alumna, taking up the role on 1 August 2024.

== Recognition ==
Okoro has been listed several times in the Powerlist, a listing of the most influential black people in the United Kingdom most recently being listed in the 2020 edition. In the 2015 list, she was at fourth place (or fifth, as third place was shared).

City, University of London awarded Okoro an honorary doctorate in 2014 for her "outstanding achievements in the legal profession and financial services", noting that in her then role of general counsel at HSBC Asset Management "She is the only female lawyer from an ethnic minority holding such a position in the City".

In 2014, The Guardian listed Okoro as one of "10 women who are changing the face of the City".

At the 2016 UK Diversity Legal Awards, Okoro was given a BSN Lifetime Achievement Award.

In July 2019, Okoro featured in a biography film as part of the First 100 Years of Women (2014–2019): Women in Law campaign, created to mark 100 years since British women were legally allowed to join the professions, including law.

Okoro was appointed Officer of the Order of the British Empire (OBE) in the 2024 New Year Honours, "For services to Diversity in International Finance".

== Personal life ==
Okoro has a son and a daughter, and in 2010 was on the board of governors of her daughter's school.

Okoro completed the London Marathon in 1997 and 1999.

She has said that the two people she most admires are Nelson Mandela and a family member.

Academic offices
Preceded by Karan Bilimoria	Chancellor of the University of Birmingham; 2024–present	Succeeded by Incumbent
