= Courtenay Griffiths =

British lawyer (1955–2025)

Courtenay Griffiths KC
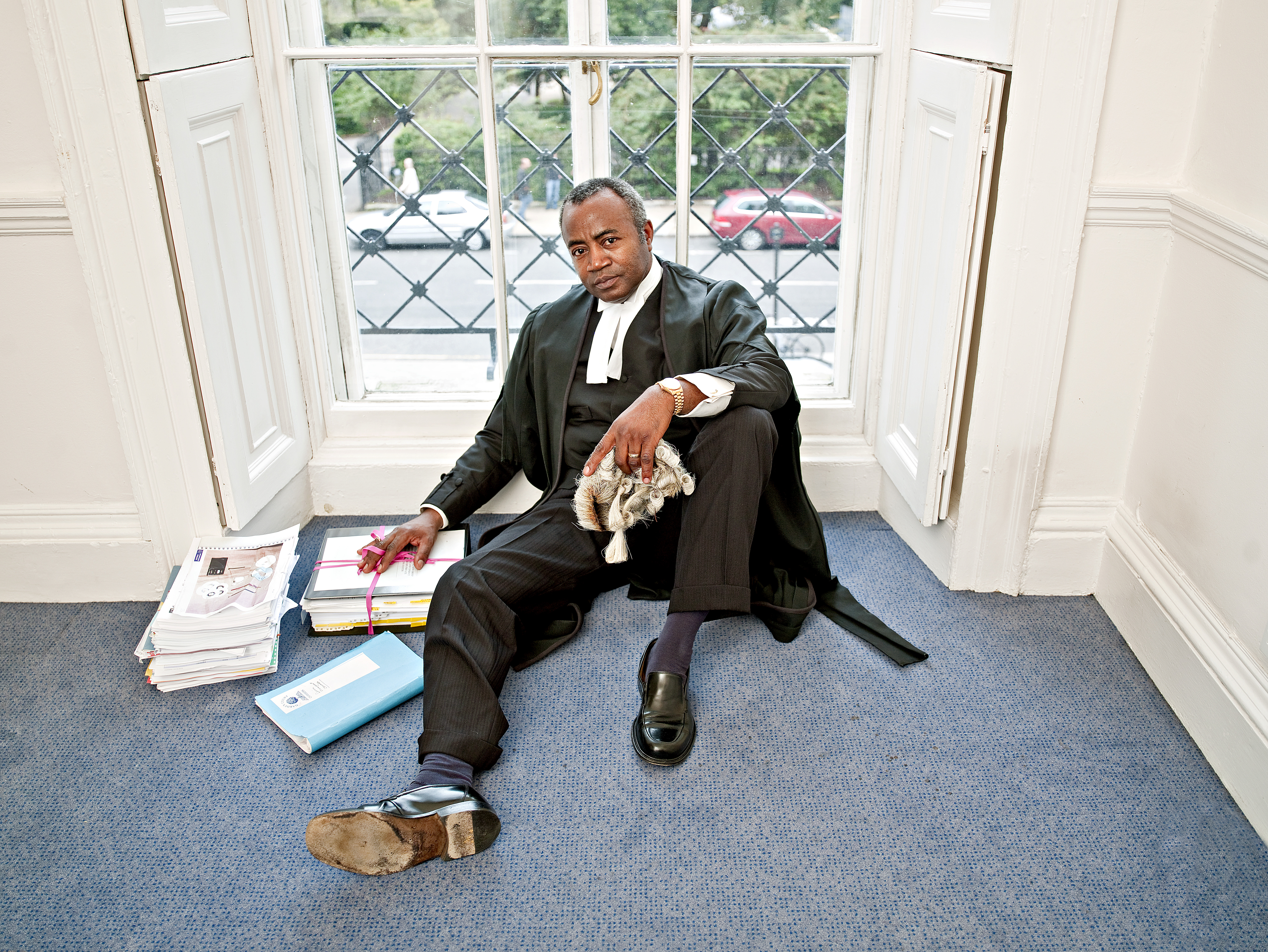
- Courtenay Griffiths in 2007
- Born: Courtenay Delsdue McVay Griffiths; 10 October 1955; Kingston, Jamaica
- Died: 23 June 2025 (aged 69)
- Education: Bablake School; London School of Economics
- Occupation: Barrister
- Known for: a member of Wyeth Thomas Chambers

Courtenay Delsdue McVay Griffiths KC (10 October 1955 – 23 June 2025) was a Jamaican-born British barrister, who defended in some high-profile cases. He was a member of Wyeth Thomas Chambers. Called to the bar in 1980, Griffiths was among the first black lawyers to take silk, being made then-Queen's Counsel in 1998.

== Early life ==
Born in Kingston, Jamaica on 10 October 1955, the second youngest child of a carpenter father, Griffiths moved to England with his family in 1961 and was raised in Coventry. Educated at Bablake School, he graduated in 1979 with an LLB (Hons) from the London School of Economics.

== Career ==
Griffiths pursued a law career after his father told him stories about Norman Manley QC, the first Prime Minister of Jamaica. Griffiths was called to the bar in 1980.

He was a Legal Assistant to the Greater London Council's Police Support Committee, and also spent 12 months as a Revson Fellow at City College, New York. On return to the UK he practised mainly in West Yorkshire, in the Leeds and Bradford courts. He was made King's Counsel in 1998.

In later years, he practised predominantly in criminal defence, including murder cases, fraud and drug offences. He practised from 25 Bedford Row Chambers. Griffiths sat part-time in the Crown Court as a Recorder, chaired the Public Affairs Committee of the Bar Council, and worked for several years as chair of its Race Relations Committee.

Griffiths held honorary Doctor of Laws degrees from Coventry University and Leeds Metropolitan University. In 2008, he gave the annual Norman Manley Lecture at the Norman Manley Law School, University of the West Indies, which aims to highlight issues of national and international public concern.

On 16 March 2021, while representing Claudia Webbe, Griffiths was taken to hospital by ambulance.

=== Notable cases ===
- Brighton hotel bombing
- Harrods bombing
- 1996 Docklands bombing
- Risley Prison riot
- Dartmoor Prison riot
- R v Silcott & others - the Keith Blakelock murder trial which arose out of the Broadwater Farm Estate riot
- Successful appeal for Johnson, Davis and Rowe, 2000
- Damilola Taylor murder, first trial, 2002
- Goswell v Commissioner of Police for the Metropolis - for a while, this case recorded the highest award of damages made by a jury against a police force
- Charles Taylor trial in The Hague, 2007–2012

== Personal life and death ==
Griffiths was married to Angela, and had one daughter and three sons. He collected music, supported Liverpool F.C. and the West Indies Cricket Team, and was a trustee of the Bernie Grant Trust.

Griffiths died from a stroke on 23 June 2025, at the age of 69.
