= Star King Solomon Academy =

Location
- Lord Street; Birmingham, West Midlands, B7 4AA; England; 52°29′25″N 1°53′08″W

Information
- Type: Free school
- Motto: Education Excellence & Character Development
- Religious affiliation: Christian
- Established: 2015
- Department for Education URN: 149155 Tables
- Ofsted: Reports
- Co-principals: Michelle Grannell and Adrian Rollins
- Gender: Mixed
- Age: 4 to 16
- Enrolment: 1200
- Colours: Purple, Gold
- Website: starkingsolomon.org

Star King Solomon Academy (previously King Solomon International Business School) is an all-through (primary and secondary) school located in Birmingham, England, on the old site of Waterlinks House. It opened in 2015. It is a multi-denominational Christian school, although it takes in students of any faith or no faith.

The school is part of Star Academies multi-academy trust.

== School performance and inspections ==
As of February 2025, the school's last inspection by Ofsted was in September 2024. The judgements were: Quality of education: Inadequate; Behaviour: Requires Improvement; Personal development: Requires Improvement; Leadership and management: Inadequate; Early years provision: Good.

== Curriculum ==
The school offers a curriculum for primary and secondary. The school's specialism is leadership.

The National Curriculum is followed throughout the school. At Key Stage 4, students follow a core GCSE curriculum but have the option to take vocational subjects as well.
