= Barings LLC =

American investment management firm

Barings
- Type: Subsidiary
- Industry: Financial services
- Founded: 1762; 264 years ago
- Headquarters: Charlotte, North Carolina
- Area served: Worldwide
- Key people: Mike Freno (chairman and CEO)
- Products: Asset management
- AUM: US$500 billion (September 2026)
- Owner: MassMutual Financial Group, MS&AD Insurance Group
- Number of employees: 2,000+ employees globally
- Parent: Massachusetts Mutual Life Insurance Company
- Website: barings.com

Barings LLC is a major American alternative investment management firm. It operates as a subsidiary of MassMutual Financial Group, a diversified financial services organization, with a minority investment from MS&AD Insurance Group, a Japanese insurance company.

As of September 30, 2026 Barings held US$500+ billion in assets under management. Barings has over 2,000 professionals and 34 offices around the globe.

Barings' Private Credit and Infrastructure are considered to be the firm's most reputable franchises, ranking in the global Top 10 in their respective teams.

== Services ==
Barings is a global alternative asset manager that partners with institutional, insurance, and wealth clients, and supports leading businesses with flexible financing solutions. The firm seeks to deliver excess returns by leveraging its global scale and capabilities across credit, real assets, capital solutions and emerging markets.

== History ==
Barings, originally established as a firm of merchants and merchant bankers, was formed in London in 1762.

In the 1950s, Barings realised the potential of asset management and set up its own investment department in 1955. Clients were corporate clients, sovereign connections, pension funds and charitable institutions. In the 1970s, Barings expanded this business internationally with offices in the Far East, North America and Europe. In 1989, Barings combined all of its asset management activities within Baring Asset Management Limited, headquartered in London. In 1995, Barings Bank, the oldest investment bank in Britain, collapsed as a result of unauthorised trading by its head derivatives trader in Singapore, Nick Leeson, who was imprisoned for six and a half years in Singapore. It was then bought for £1 by ING Group, a Dutch bank.

In March 2005, Baring Asset Management was split and Massachusetts Mutual Life Insurance Company (MassMutual) acquired Baring Asset Management's investment management activities and the rights to use the Baring Asset Management name. Northern Trust acquired Baring Asset Management’s Financial Services Group.

In September 2016, MassMutual merged Babson Capital Management, Wood Creek Capital Management, Cornerstone Real Estate Advisers, and Baring Asset Management to form Barings.

=== Timeline ===
- 2010 – Baring Asset Management wins the Queen’s Award for Enterprise 2010 in the International Trade Category
- 2012 – 250th Anniversary
- 2013 – Baring Asset Management completes acquisition of SEI Asset Korea Co., Ltd (SEIAK)
- 2016 – Barings is formed after MassMutual merges Babson Capital Management, Wood Creek Capital Management, Cornerstone Real Estate Advisers and Baring Asset Management.
- 2018 - Barings Acquires Triangle Capital Corporation (Renamed Barings BDC INC.)
- 2020 - Barings BDC Closes Merger with MVC Capital
- 2021 - Barings BDC closes merger with Sierra Income Corporation
- 2022 - Barings Acquires Altis Property Partners
- 2024 - Barings Acquires Artemis Real Estate Partners
- 2026 - MS&AD Insurance Group acquires 18% stake in Barings
