= Vanessa Kingori =

Kenyan-born writer, publisher of GQ magazine

Vanessa Kingori OBE
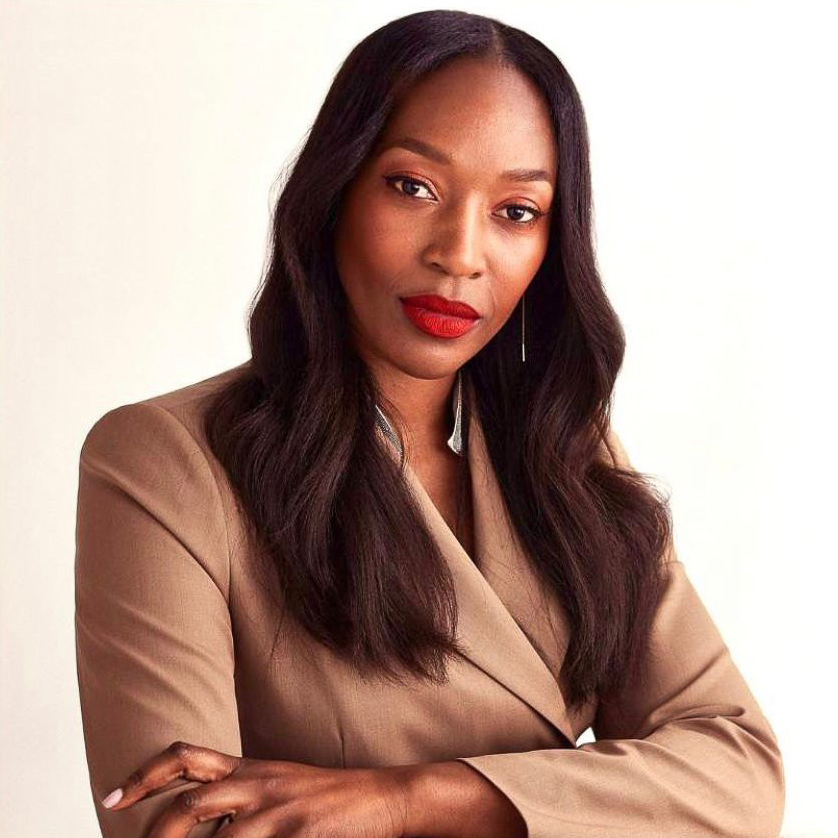
- Born: Kenya
- Education: Royal Holloway, University of London
- Employer: [Google]
- Known for: Google Managing Director. Formerly: Chief Business Officer, Condé Nast Britain (September 2021–2023); Publishing Director of British Vogue (January 2018–2023); Publisher of British GQ (March 2008–December 2017)

Vanessa Kingori is a Kenyan-born British businesswoman in the media and creative industries, notably known as British Vogue’s first female Publishing Director in over 100 years and Condé Nast Britain’s first black publisher. She later became one of Google’s most senior black leaders in Europe upon her appointment as Managing Director of Technology, Media and Telecommunications for the UK & Ireland. She has also received both an MBE and an OBE for her services to the British media industry and was named the Powerlist’s Most Influential Black Executive in 2023.

== Life ==
Kingori was born in Kenya and initially educated on the Caribbean island of Saint Kitts before moving permanently to London to complete her education. She went to Royal Holloway College of the University of London. She worked on the London Evening Standard and then at Esquire before her tenure at Condé Nast.

In March 2015, she was appointed publisher of British GQ across all platforms. 2016 marked her first year as publisher and GQ's most successful year of the last decade. GQ won several digital commercial awards in her tenure.

In September 2017, she was appointed publishing director of all British Vogue platforms - the first female publishing director in its over 100-year history. She is the first person of colour in the role and Condé Nast UK's youngest serving Publishing Director. Kingori began her role as Publishing Director of British Vogue in January 2018.

In September 2021, Kingori was promoted to chief business officer across the entire British company, covering all Condé Nast Britain brands – Vogue, GQ, GQ Style, Wired, Vanity Fair, Glamour, Tatler, Johansen's, Conde Nast Traveler, House & Garden and The World of Interiors. This is in addition to continuing her existing responsibilities directly leading British Vogue. She was also appointed as Vogue European Business

== Social influence ==
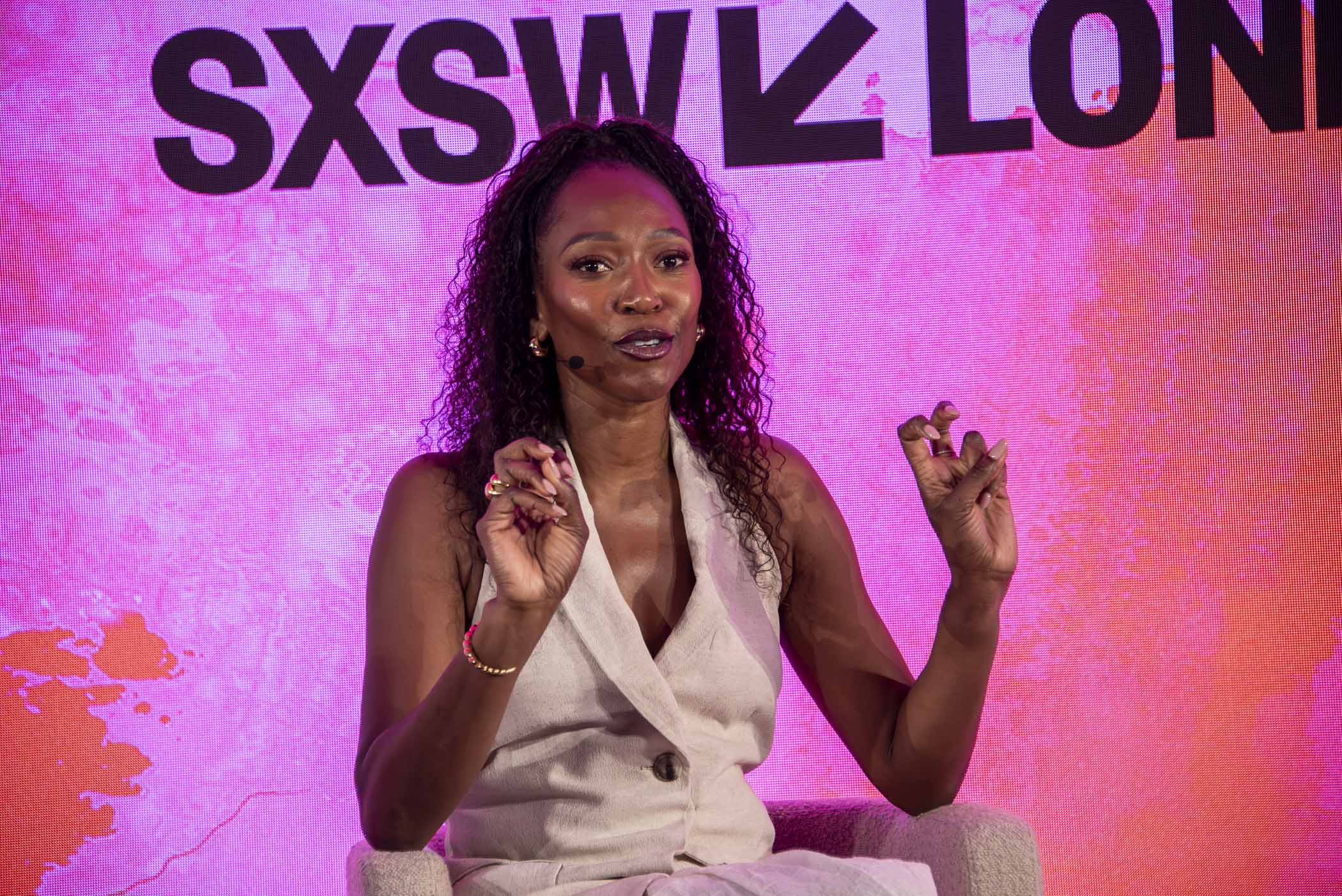
Kingori at SXSW London in June 2025.

Kingori is a visiting fellow at the University of the Arts London (UAL), sits on several boards and is a regular public speaker.

She has sat on the judging panel of the Black British Business Awards since 2015. and has been regularly listed as one of the UK's 100 most influential Black Britons by the Powerlist, with her most recent appearance in the 2021 edition.

In January 2017, the Mayor of London, Sadiq Khan appointed her to his Brexit Advisory Panel, which gives advice following the vote to leave the European Union.

In her work as youth advocate, Kingori sits on UAL's board of directors as a governor and trustee and enjoys a long-standing role as visiting fellow at the University of the Arts London, where she supports and mentors students across the institution's six colleges, which include Central Saint Martins and London College of Fashion. This is in addition to her key responsibilities giving governance regarding the organisations key business decisions. Kingori was awarded a UAL Honorary Doctorate in 2018 and an Honorary Fellowship from Royal Holloway in 2021.

Kingori's work as diversity proponent includes the judging panel of the Black British Business Awards, the Veuve Clicquot Business Women of The Year Award, The Mayor of London's TFL's diversity in advertising competition. Kingori is a member of the Royal College of Obstetricians and Gynaecologists Race Equality Taskforce. In support of women entrepreneurs, she is also part of a microfund, Peanut StartHer, which is focused on helping pre-seed entrepreneurs in tech and business, with a particular focus on giving purpose-driven startups founded by women their first boost.

== #ShareTheMicUK ==
In October 2020, during the UK's Black History Month, Kingori and Stephanie Phair co-organised the #ShareTheMic UK campaign to highlight the accomplishments and contributions of high-achieving Black women, using the allyship of successful White women. The project was backed by Instagram and participants included Priya Ahluwalia, Bernardine Evaristo, Bianca Saunders, June Sarpong, Emma Dabiri, Kourtney Kardashian, Gwyneth Paltrow, Victoria Beckham, Sheryl Sandberg, Christiane Amanpour and Brooke Shields, with a combined audience of 175 million. The campaign helped to launch several exciting new collaborations, inspiring conversations, books, podcasts and new friendships between unlikely pairings. Kingori said she had never witnessed more meaningful, honest discussions about racial disparity as she has amid the challenges and tragedies of 2020.

== Honours and awards ==
Kingori was appointed Member of the Order of the British Empire (MBE) in the 2016 Birthday Honours and Officer of the Order of the British Empire (OBE) in the 2023 New Year Honours for services to the media industry.

Kingori was awarded the "Media Mogul of the Year" award at the 2017 Black Magic Awards.

In May 2018, Kingori was listed as second on the Financial Times "EMpower 100 Ethnic Minority Leaders" list and she was awarded a Best of Africa Special Award.

In July 2018, Kingori was awarded an Honorary Doctorate from University of the Arts London and she was placed onto The Female FTSE Board Report 2018 "100 Women to Watch" list by Cranfield University.

From 2013 to 2021, Kingori has been regularly listed as one of the UK's 100 most influential Black Britons by the Powerlist.

In 2020, Kingori topped Campaign's 2020 Trailblazers list alongside British Vogue's Editor-in-chief, Edward Enninful.
