= Anne Mensah =

British broadcasting executive

Anne Mensah is a British broadcasting executive, and vice-president of content at Netflix.

== Early life and education ==
Mensah's mother was a Canadian teacher and father a Ghanaian accountant. She grew up in Lewisham and has described her childhood as normal. She was educated at Sedgehill School in Catford, south London, including an A-level in film. At the University of Exeter she earned a degree in American and Commonwealth arts.

== Career ==
Mensah's early jobs included working in retailer BHS and at a hairdresser.

After university she became a trainee at Carlton Television. She was Head of Independent Drama at the BBC as well as Head of Drama for BBC Scotland, and then Director of Drama and Sky Studios at Sky UK. In 2019 she joined Netflix.

In October 2021, she was ranked third in the Powerlist 2022 rankings of the most influential black people in the UK.

She is vice-president of the Royal Central School of Speech and Drama, formerly a governor and chair of the diversity & inclusion committee.

In September 2026, Mensah was awarded the Contribution to the Industry Award by Production Guild UK for her work across commissioning for the UK across Sky, BBC and Netflix.
