= 100 Great Black Britons =

Public polls in 2003 and 2020

100 Great Black Britons is a poll that was first undertaken in 2003 to vote for and celebrate the greatest Black Britons of all time. It was created in a campaign initiated by Patrick Vernon in response to a BBC search for 100 Greatest Britons, together with a television series (2002), which featured no Black Britons in the published listing. The result of Vernon's campaign was that in February 2004 Mary Seacole was announced as having been voted the greatest Black Briton. Following the original poll, 100 Great Black Britons was re-launched in 2020 in an updated version based on public voting, together with a book of the same title.

== Background ==
In 2002, the BBC launched a campaign and television series called 100 Greatest Britons, with the definition of a great Briton as "anyone who was born in the British Isles, or who has lived in the British Isles, and has played a significant part in the life of the British Isles". The series was the idea of Jane Root, then Controller of BBC Two, and in the final results of the BBC poll, Winston Churchill was voted "the greatest Briton ever". At the time, the poll was criticised for lacking in diversity, as out of 100 nominees only 13 were women while none were Black (of African descent).

In response to the absence of any Black people in the "100 Greatest Britons poll", Every Generation and Patrick Vernon launched a website and the alternative campaign, 100 Great Black Britons, in October 2003 during Black History Month, to "raise the profile of the Black contribution to Britain". Vernon said: "Black history hasn't been recognised. We didn't come here at Windrush in [1948] – we've been here for a thousand years. We've influenced and shaped Britain." Believing that people were not aware of the long history of Black people in the UK, he later added that the poll was part of a campaign to provide role models of Black Britons of all ages. The website that hosted the survey www.100greatestblackbritons.com received more than a million hits during the online campaign, and more than 100,000 people voted in the poll over three months, choosing from a selection of present-day and historic Black figures. The poll has been described as a landmark moment and one of the most successful movements to focus on the role of people of African and Caribbean descent in British history.

Top of the subsequent list of 100 Greatest Black Britons was Mary Seacole, a nurse who helped soldiers during the Crimean War and who is often overshadowed by the work of her contemporary, Florence Nightingale, and whose contribution was often ignored by the history books. Other figures in the first poll of 100 Greatest Black Britons of all time included musicians, politicians, media figures, and religious leaders. Response to the list saw Black historical figures being added to the school curriculum, blue plaques were put up in memory of some of the individuals on the list and a statue of Mary Seacole was unveiled in the garden of St Thomas' Hospital in London. In March 2020, a petition was started to campaign for the temporary field hospital in Birmingham to be named after Mary Seacole after it was established that Birmingham's National Exhibition Centre would be used to treat COVID-19 patients: this was in response to the temporary hospital at London's ExCel centre being named the Nightingale Hospital after Florence Nightingale.

=== Criticism ===
Paul Phoenix, of Black Parents in Education, criticised the poll for being inspired by the 100 Greatest Britons poll and copying the idea. Phoenix said, "Why do we always have to keep reacting to what other people do? We should celebrate our heroes every single day the year and not wait until Black History Month to bring these issues to public attention". Sam Walker, of the Black Cultural Archives, responded in support of the 100 Great Black Britons poll, stating that "it doesn't matter whether the poll is a copycat idea; so is Black History Month, which came from America in the late 1980s and has served us well to date".

The inclusion of Queen Philippa of Hainault on the list was criticised, as historians dispute that she was "black" in any modern sense. She was of predominantly European ancestry, with remote Armenian ancestry on her father's side, and Cuman (Turkic/Asian) ancestry on her mother's side. A report written by Bishop Walter de Stapledon in c.1319 describes either Philippa (then a child) or one of her sisters as "brown of skin all over", with hair "betwixt blue-black and brown"; but, aside from the confusion over which sister is being described, it is unclear precisely what these terms imply. All known portraits appear to show Philippa as white. Historian Kathryn Warner concludes that she was "a European woman and emphatically not of African ancestry".

Similarly, the inclusion of Elizabeth Barrett Browning was challenged, The New York Times singling her out as one of those on the list who "would no doubt have been surprised to hear that they were black". Barrett Browning was descended from slave-owning families in Jamaica on both the paternal and maternal sides of her family. She once wrote of yearning "to own some purer lineage than that of the blood of the slave!", a comment that has led some to suggest that she "believed that she had African blood"; but Marjorie Stone concludes that the "evidence does not support the speculation", and that Barrett Browning was in fact alluding to "the 'curse' of profiting from the blood of slaves".

== 2003 poll results ==
=== Top 10 ===
Rank	image	Name	Description	Notability
1		Mary Seacole (1805–1881)	British-Jamaican businesswoman and nurse	Mary Jane Seacole (née Grant; 23 November 1805 – 14 May 1881) was a British-Jamaican businesswoman and nurse who set up the "British Hotel" – a "comfortable quarters" for sick and injured soldiers – behind the lines during the Crimean War. Coming from a tradition of Jamaican and West African "doctresses", Seacole used herbal remedies to treat soldiers. She was posthumously awarded the Jamaican Order of Merit in 1990. Her autobiography, Wonderful Adventures of Mrs Seacole in Many Lands (1857), is one of the earliest autobiographies of a mixed-race woman.
2 =		Bishop Wilfred Wood (born 1936)		Wilfred Denniston Wood KA (born 15 June 1936) was a Bishop of Croydon from 1985 to 2003 (and the first area bishop there from 1991). He was the first Black bishop in the Church of England. On 30 November 2000 – Barbados Independence Day – the Queen appointed Wood a Knight of St Andrew, the highest class within the Order of Barbados, "for his contribution to race relations in the United Kingdom and general contribution to the welfare of Barbadians living there".
2 =		Dr Oliver Lyseight (1919–2006)	Founding Father of the New Testament Church of God England & Wales	Dr Oliver Lyseight (11 December 1919 – 28 February 2006), who migrated to England from Jamaica in 1951, was a Bishop and the co-founder, alongside Bishop Herman Brown, of one of Britain's largest black majority churches. As of 2024, the church, which is denominationally Pentecostal, claims more than 130 distinct branches and 11,000 members. Lyseight was a spiritual leader to the "Windrush generation", the first Caribbeans to emigrate in significant numbers to Britain, notably in 1948 aboard the HMT Empire Windrush.
3		Mary Prince (1788–1833)	Writer and enslaved woman	Mary Prince (c. 1 October 1788 – after 1833) was a British abolitionist and autobiographer, born in Bermuda to an enslaved family of African descent. Subsequent to her escape, when she was living in London, England, she wrote her slave narrative The History of Mary Prince (1831), which was the first account of the life of a black woman to be published in the United Kingdom. This first-hand description of the brutalities of enslavement, released at a time when slavery was still legal in Bermuda and British Caribbean colonies, had a galvanising effect on the anti-slavery movement. It was reprinted twice in its first year. Prince had her account transcribed while living and working in England at the home of Thomas Pringle, a founder of the Anti-Slavery Society. She had gone from Antigua to London with her master and his family in 1828.
4		Olaudah Equiano (1745–1797)	African abolitionist and author	Olaudah Equiano (c. 1745 – 31 March 1797), known for most of his life as Gustavus Vassa (/ˈvæsə/), was a writer and abolitionist from, according to his memoir, the Eboe region of the Kingdom of Benin (today southern Nigeria). Enslaved as a child, he was taken to the Caribbean and sold as a slave to a Royal Navy officer. He was sold twice more but purchased his freedom in 1766. As a freedman in London, Equiano supported the British abolitionist movement. He was part of the Sons of Africa, an abolitionist group composed of Africans living in Britain, and he was active among leaders of the anti-slave trade movement in the 1780s. He published his autobiography, The Interesting Narrative of the Life of Olaudah Equiano (1789), which depicted the horrors of slavery. It went through nine editions in his lifetime and helped gain passage of the British Slave Trade Act 1807, which abolished the slave trade. Equiano married an English woman named Susannah Cullen in 1792 and they had two daughters. He died in 1797 in Westminster. Since the late 20th century, when his autobiography was published in a new edition, Equiano has been increasingly studied by a range of scholars, including from his homeland.
5		Philippa of Hainault (1310/15 – 1369)	14th-century noblewoman and queen of England	Philippa of Hainault (Middle French: Philippe de Hainaut; 24 June c.1310/15 – 15 August 1369) was Queen of England as the wife of King Edward III. Edward promised in 1326 to marry her within the following two years. She was married to Edward, first by proxy, when Edward dispatched the Bishop of Coventry "to marry her in his name" in Valenciennes, the second city of the County of Hainaut, in October 1327. The marriage was celebrated formally in York Minster on 24 January 1328, some months after Edward's accession to the throne of England. In August 1328, he also fixed his wife's dower. Philippa acted as regent in 1346, when her husband was away from his kingdom, and she often accompanied him on his expeditions to Scotland, France, and Flanders. Philippa won much popularity with the English people for her kindness and compassion, which were demonstrated in 1347 when she successfully persuaded King Edward to spare the lives of the Burghers of Calais. This popularity helped maintain peace in England throughout Edward's long reign. The eldest of her thirteen children was Edward the Black Prince, who became a renowned military leader. Philippa died at the age of 56 from an illness closely related to edema. The Queen's College, Oxford, was founded in her honour. Philippa's inclusion on the Black Britons list proved controversial, as historians dispute that she was "black" in any modern sense: see Criticism section above.
6		Courtney Pine (born 1964)	British musician	Courtney Pine, CBE (born 18 March 1964 in London) is a British jazz musician, who was the principal founder in the 1980s of the black British band the Jazz Warriors. Although known primarily for his saxophone playing, Pine is a multi-instrumentalist, also playing the flute, clarinet, bass clarinet and keyboards. On his 2011 album, Europa, he plays almost exclusively bass clarinet. Pine's parents were Jamaican immigrants, his father a carpenter and his mother a housing manager. As a child, Pine wanted to be an astronaut. Born in London, he went to Kingsbury High School, where he studied classical clarinet, teaching himself the saxophone from the age of 14. He began his music career playing reggae, touring in 1981 with Clint Eastwood & General Saint.
7 =		Sir Bill Morris (born 1938)	British trade unionist	William Manuel Morris, Baron Morris of Handsworth, OJ, DL (born 19 October 1938), generally known as Bill Morris, is a former British trade union leader. He was General Secretary of the Transport and General Workers' Union from 1992 to 2003, and the first black leader of a major British trade union. Morris sits in the House of Lords, taking the Labour Party whip.
7 =		Sir Trevor McDonald (born 1939)	British newsreader and journalist	Sir Trevor McDonald, OBE (born George McDonald; 16 August 1939) is a Trinidadian-British newsreader and journalist, best known for his career as a television news presenter with ITN. Trevor McDonald was born in San Fernando, Trinidad and Tobago, to Josephine and Lawson McDonald. McDonald is of Dougla heritage, his mother being of African descent and his father being of Indian descent. McDonald was knighted in 1999 for his services to journalism.
8		Shirley Bassey (born 1937)	Welsh singer	Dame Shirley Veronica Bassey, DBE (/ˈbæsi/; born 8 January 1937) is a Welsh singer whose career began in the mid-1950s, and is well known both for her powerful voice and for recording the theme songs to the James Bond films Goldfinger (1964), Diamonds Are Forever (1971), and Moonraker (1979). In January 1959, Bassey became the first Welsh person to gain a No. 1 single. In 2000, Bassey was appointed a Dame Commander of the Order of the British Empire (DBE) for services to the performing arts. In 1977, she received the Brit Award for Best British Female Solo Artist in the previous 25 years. Bassey is considered one of the most popular female vocalists in Britain during the second half of the 20th century.
9		Bernie Grant (1944–2000)		Bernard Alexander Montgomery Grant (17 February 1944 – 8 April 2000), known as Bernie Grant, was a British Labour Party politician who was the Member of Parliament for Tottenham from 1987 to his death in 2000. Grant was born in Georgetown, British Guiana, to schoolteacher parents, who in 1963 took up the UK Government's offer to people from the crown colonies to settle in the UK. Grant attended Tottenham Technical College, and went on to take a degree course in Mining Engineering at Heriot-Watt University in Edinburgh, Scotland. In the mid-1960s, he was, for a period, a member of the Socialist Labour League, led by Gerry Healy. This later became known as the Workers Revolutionary Party. He quickly became a trade union official, and moved into politics, becoming a Labour councillor in the London Borough of Haringey in 1978. He was elected as the MP for Tottenham at the 1987 general election, one of the UK's first Black British MPs, being elected at the same time as Diane Abbott and Paul Boateng, as well as Britain's first British South Asian MP Keith Vaz. In September 2007, in Tottenham, London, Haringey Council opened the Bernie Grant Arts Centre in his name.
10		Professor Stuart Hall (1932–2014)	Sociologist and cultural theorist	Stuart McPhail Hall FBA (3 February 1932 – 10 February 2014) was a Jamaican-born British Marxist sociologist, cultural theorist and political activist. Hall, along with Richard Hoggart and Raymond Williams, was one of the founding figures of the school of thought that is now known as British Cultural Studies or The Birmingham School of Cultural Studies. In the 1950s, Hall was a founder of the influential New Left Review. At Hoggart's invitation, he joined the Centre for Contemporary Cultural Studies at Birmingham University in 1964. Hall took over from Hoggart as acting director of the Centre in 1968, became its director in 1972, and remained there until 1979. While at the centre, Hall is credited with playing a role in expanding the scope of cultural studies to deal with race and gender, and with helping to incorporate new ideas derived from the work of French theorists such as Michel Foucault. Hall left the centre in 1979 to become a professor of sociology at the Open University. He was President of the British Sociological Association, 1995–97. He retired from the Open University in 1997 and was a professor emeritus. British newspaper The Observer called him "one of the country's leading cultural theorists". Hall was also involved in the Black Arts Movement. Film directors such as John Akomfrah and Isaac Julien also see him as one of their heroes. Hall was married to Catherine Hall, a feminist professor of modern British history at University College London, with whom he had two children.

== 2003 poll – full list ==
- Diane Abbott
- Ira Aldridge
- Dounne Alexander
- Baroness Valerie Amos
- Viv Anderson
- John Archer
- Joan Armatrading CBE
- Jennette Arnold
- Jazzie B
- Francis Barber
- John Barnes
- Dame Jocelyn Barrow
- Dame Shirley Bassey
- Brendan Batson
- Floella Benjamin
- Nigel Benn
- Patrick Berry
- Oswald Boateng
- Paul Boateng
- Nana Bonsu
- George Bridgetower
- Yvonne Brewster
- Errol Brown
- Elizabeth Barrett Browning
- Frank Bruno
- Naomi Campbell
- David Case
- Queen Charlotte
- Linford Christie
- Samuel Coleridge-Taylor
- Lord Learie Constantine
- John Conteh
- William Cuffay
- Ottobah Cuguano
- Craig David
- Des'ree
- Desmond Douglas
- Niger Val Dub
- Ms. Dynamite
- John Edmonstone
- Olaudah Equiano
- Chris Eubank
- Michael Fuller
- Gabrielle
- Len Garrison
- Goldie
- Bernie Grant
- Jeremy Guscott
- Professor Stuart Hall
- Al Hamilton
- Ellery Hanley
- Sir Lenny Henry
- Peter Herbert
- Baroness Rosalind Howells
- Paul Ince
- Colin Jackson
- Lee Jasper
- Linton Kwesi Johnson
- Claudia Jones
- Janet Kay
- Kanya King
- Baroness Oona King
- Beverley Knight
- Dame Cleo Laine DBE
- David Lammy
- Stephen Lawrence
- Angie Le Mar
- Denise Lewis
- Lennox Lewis
- George of Lydda
- Phil Lynott
- Dr. Oliver Lyseight
- Val McCalla
- Sir Trevor McDonald
- Paul McGrath
- Dr. Harold Moody
- Lord Bill Morris
- Martin Offiah
- Chris Ofili
- Sir Ben Okri OBE
- Bruce Oldfield
- Lord Herman Ouseley
- Mica Paris
- Queen Philippa
- Trevor Phillips
- Courtney Pine
- Lord David Pitt
- Mary Prince
- Sade
- Ignatius Sancho
- Tessa Sanderson
- Baroness Patricia Scotland
- Mary Seacole
- Seal
- Emperor Septimius Severus
- Zadie Smith
- Julius Soubise
- Moira Stuart
- Lord John Taylor
- Caroll Thompson
- Daley Thompson
- Randolph Turpin
- Rudolph Walker CBE
- Andrew Watson
- Robert Wedderburn
- Arthur Wharton
- Willard White
- Henry Sylvester Williams
- Bishop Wilfred Wood
- Ian Wright
- Benjamin Zephaniah

== 2019–2020 relaunch ==
In 2019, the decision was taken to relaunch and update the 100 Great Black Britons poll 16 years after the first poll. This was made in reaction to the lack of awareness in the general of public to Black British culture, establishment in Britain and Black Britons in general, in addition to both the "Windrush scandal" and the 2016 United Kingdom European Union membership referendum. The campaign and poll was re-launched by Vernon and Dr Angeline Osborne, an independent researcher and heritage consultant, in the wake of the Windrush scandal, the Brexit referendum, the rise of right-wing populism and the continuing economic issues faced by black communities across the UK. Repeating the poll was believed to be of great importance as academics and independent scholars have discovered new Black British historical figures and new role models have emerged since the first poll in 2003. The poll and campaign was re-launched to celebrate and tackle the invisibility of Black people's achievements and contributions in the UK. The public was invited to vote for the most-admired Black Briton in several categories, and from the thousands of nominations received in 2019 a shortlist was selected.

As part of the 100 Great Black Britons campaign, children and young people have been encouraged to explore Black British history and celebrate the continued legacy and achievements of Black people in Britain. The competition is sponsored by the National Education Union (NEU) and Kevin Courtney, the NEU's joint general secretary has said: "The NEU supports this competition to celebrate what we have always known: that Britain's history is irrefutably rooted in black and global history". Schools have also been encouraged to engage with the competition, with suggestions that young people could dress up as their favourite Black Briton, create a project or write an essay to honour the legacy and heritage of Black Britons and to celebrate Black British history. Arike Oke, managing director of Black Cultural Archives, has said: "The resources on the 100 Great Black Britons site can be used by families, parents, guardians and carers to help children understand themselves and their wider history".

The results of the updated poll were revealed in a new book published on 24 September 2020. The 2020 list was compiled by a panel after the public was invited to submit nominations and, according to Vernon, "could easily have been called 1,000 Great Black Britons", based on the volume of nominations, which have been listed in the book, alongside biographies of the top 100. The selection was made from among people who have made major contributions to arts, science, business, philanthropy and other areas in the UK and who had used their positions to advance the Black community. Described by the Hackney Citizen as "inspiring and highly educational", the book was ranked at the top of the Amazon book charts two weeks before it was published. With the book's publication, a campaign was launched to pay for a copy to be sent to every secondary school, against the background of calls for Black and other minorities' history to be added to the National Curriculum being rejected by the government.

== 2020 list ==
Unlike the earlier list, the 2020 list is not ranked:

- Diane Abbott
- Victor Adebowale, Baron Adebowale CBE
- Ade Adepitan MBE
- Dr Maggie Aderin-Pocock MBE
- Professor Hakim Adi
- Sir David Adjaye OM, OBE, RA
- John Agard FRSL
- Akala
- John Akomfrah CBE
- Ira Aldridge
- Valerie Amos, Baroness Amos LG, CH
- Kehinde Andrews
- Professor Dame Elizabeth Anionwu OM, DBE
- Dr Elaine Arnold
- Amma Asante MBE
- Winifred Atwell
- Dame Jocelyn Barrow DBE
- Colour Sergeant Johnson Beharry VC, COG
- Floella Benjamin, Baroness Benjamin of Beckenham OM, DBE, DL
- Munroe Bergdorf
- Jak Beula
- Karen Blackett OBE
- Malorie Blackman OBE
- John Blanke
- Dennis Bovell
- Sonia Boyce OBE, RA
- Dr Aggrey Burke
- Vanley Burke
- Margaret Busby CBE, Hon. FRSL
- Dawn Butler
- Earl Cameron CBE
- Betty Campbell MBE
- Naomi Campbell
- Queen Charlotte
- Edric Connor
- Lloyd Coxsone
- William Cuffay
- Quobna Ottobah Cugoano
- William Davidson
- Dame Linda Dobbs DBE
- John Edmonstone
- Idris Elba OBE
- Edward Enninful OBE
- Olaudah Equiano
- Bernardine Evaristo OBE, FRSL
- Sir Mohamed Muktar Jama Farah CBE
- Lenford Kwesi Garrison
- George the Poet
- Paul Gilroy
- Bernie Grant
- Stuart Hall
- Sir Lewis Hamilton MBE
- Sir Lenny Henry CBE
- Lubaina Himid CBE, RA
- Dame Kelly Holmes DBE
- Darcus Howe
- Rose Hudson-Wilkin MBE
- Eric Huntley and Jessica Huntley
- Professor Gus John
- Linton Kwesi Johnson
- Claudia Jones
- Sheku Kanneh-Mason MBE
- Jackie Kay CBE
- Sam King MBE
- Kwame Kwei-Armah OBE
- John La Rose
- David Lammy
- Marai Larasi MBE
- Doreen Lawrence, Baroness Lawrence of Clarendon OBE
- Andrea Levy
- Sir Steve McQueen CBE
- Thomas Molyneux
- Dr Harold Moody
- Olive Morris
- Grace Nichols FRSL
- Chi-chi Nwanoku OBE
- David Olusoga OBE
- Phyllis Opoku-Gyimah
- Olivette Otele
- Horace Ové CBE
- Elsie Owusu OBE, RIBA
- David Oyelowo OBE
- George Padmore
- Professor Sir Geoff Palmer OBE
- Alex Pascall OBE
- David Pitt, Baron Pitt of Hampstead
- Mary Prince
- Marvin Rees, Baron Rees of Easton OBE
- Bill Richmond
- Marcia Rigg
- Ignatius Sancho
- Stafford Scott
- Mary Seacole
- Menelik Shabazz
- Yinka Shonibare CBE, RA
- Paul Stephenson OBE
- Stormzy
- Robert Wedderburn
- Dame Sharon White DBE
- Henry Sylvester Williams
- Allan Wilmot
- Simon Woolley, Baron Woolley of Woodford
- Gary Younge
- Benjamin Zephaniah

== Book ==
- Patrick Vernon and Angelina Osborne, 100 Great Black Britons. Foreword by David Olusoga. London: Robinson, 2020, ISBN 1472144309.

== See also ==
- List of Black Britons
