= David Case =

David Case may refer to:

- David Frederick Case (1932–2005), British-American audiobook narrator
- David F. Case (born 1937), American writer
- David Case (RAF officer) (born 1953), black officer in the Royal Air Force of the United Kingdom
