= Statue of Mary Seacole =

Artwork at St Thomas' Hospital, London

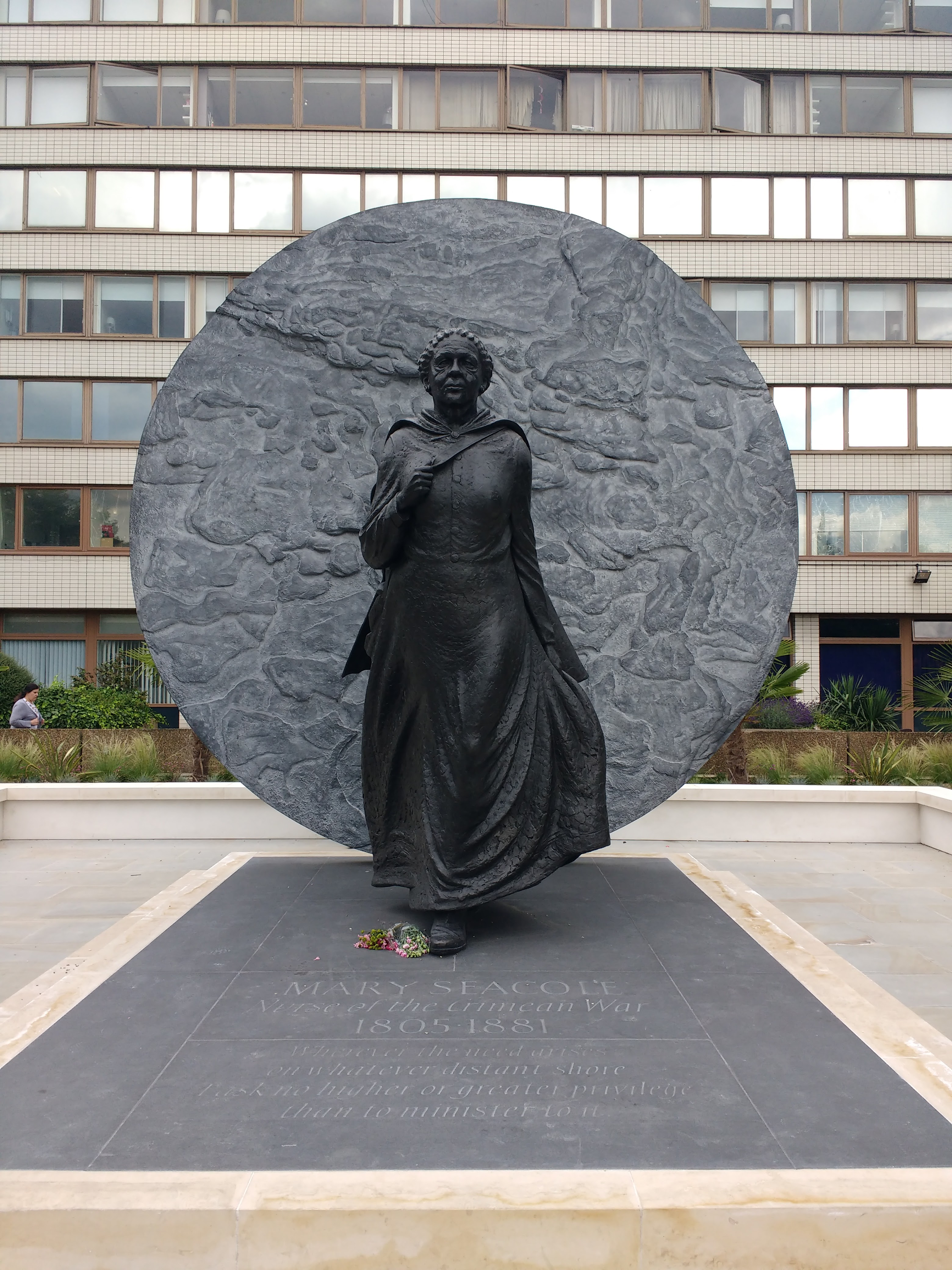
- The statue in 2016
- Artist: Martin Jennings
- Completion date: 2016
- Type: Sculpture
- Medium: bronze
- Subject: Mary Seacole
- Dimensions: 4.9 m (16 ft)
- Location: Lambeth, London; 51.5002°N 0.1189°W

The Statue of Mary Seacole stands in the grounds of St Thomas' Hospital, Lambeth, London. Sculpted by Martin Jennings, the statue was executed in 2016. It honours Mary Seacole, a British-Jamaican who established a "British Hotel" during the Crimean War and who was posthumously voted first in a poll of "100 Great Black Britons".

== Subject ==
Mary Seacole (née Grant, 1805–1881) was born in Jamaica to a Scottish father and a Jamaican mother. Following her mother as a "doctress" practising traditional herbal medicine, and as a hotel keeper, Seacole established a mess, the "British Hotel", at Balaklava during the Crimean War. Travelling to the Crimea independently after her attempts to join the official nursing contingent led by Florence Nightingale were unsuccessful, Seacole set up the hotel as a recreational and convalescence facility for officers and men and was referred to as "Mother Seacole" by the soldiery. Returning to England in 1856, she published an autobiography, Wonderful Adventures of Mrs. Seacole in Many Lands, the following year. Falling into poverty, Seacole benefited from fundraising efforts supported by a number of illustrious backers, including the war correspondent of The Times, William Howard Russell.

After her death in 1881, Seacole largely disappeared from the public consciousness. The centenary of her death saw the beginnings of a revival of interest; the Mary Seacole Memorial Association was founded in 1980, and an English Heritage blue plaque commemorated her residence in George Street, Westminster. In 2004 Seacole was voted first in a poll of 100 "Great Black Britons", and the president of the Royal College of Nursing called for the erection of a statue to honour her memory. Over a decade later, and following considerable controversy, the statue in the gardens of St Thomas' Hospital was unveiled by Floella Benjamin on 30 June 2016.

== Description ==
The statue stands in the gardens of St Thomas' Hospital, facing the Palace of Westminster. The figure of Seacole is cast in bronze and the sculptor Martin Jennings depicted Seacole in motion to represent her "marching defiantly forward into an oncoming wind, as if confronting head-on some of the personal resistance she had constantly to battle". The sculpture stands on a plinth of Cumbrian slate with Portland stone dressings. Seacole stands in front of a disc, again cast in bronze although with a lighter patina to accentuate contrasts and shadows, which shows the land surface where Seacole established her "British Hotel" in the Crimea. Jennings intended the disc to have both literal significance, as a depiction of the place where her reputation was first established, and symbolic meaning, as a block to her ambitions.

The plinth carries two inscriptions. To the front is carved Seacole's name, occupation and dates, together with words from her autobiography; "Wherever the need arises on whatever distant shore I ask no higher or greater privilege than to minister to it". The reverse describes the meaning and purpose of the disc, and carries words by William Howard Russell, the newspaper correspondent who covered the Crimean War, and Seacole's contribution; "I trust that England will not forget one who nursed her sick, who sought out her wounded to aid and succour them, and who performed the last offices for some of her illustrious dead". In 2017 the sculpture was shortlisted for the Marsh Awards, established by the Public Monuments and Sculpture Association to raise awareness of Britain's monument heritage. Seacole's statue is generally considered to be the first in Britain to recognise a named black woman. (Note: Two portrait benches, commissioned by the walking and cycling charity Sustrans for the National Cycle Network, include wire-frame sculptures of black women which predate the St. Thomas' statue. The first, of Seacole herself, is located on St Mary's Terrace, Paddington and the second, of the boxer Nicola Adams, is in Downhills Park, Haringey.) (Note: A bust of Seacole, by the Victorian sculptor Count Gleichen and carved in 1871, was put up for auction in July 2020.)

== History ==
The idea for a statue to commemorate Seacole was raised in 2004, when she topped an online poll to identify 100 Great Black Britons. Her victory led the then President of the Royal College of Nursing, Sylvia Denton, to call for the erection of a commemorative statue. The idea was supported by the London M.P. Clive Soley, who had become interested in Seacole when a group of black women from his constituency, who had served in the Women's Royal Voluntary Service, approached him for help in identifying and refurbishing Seacole's grave in St Mary's Catholic Cemetery, Kensal Green in West London. Soley subsequently became chair of the Mary Seacole Memorial Statue Appeal which undertook a twelve-year campaign to raise the necessary funds to pay for the statue. Over £500,000 was raised in private donations, and this was supplemented by the granting of £240,000 by the then Chancellor of the Exchequer, George Osborne, who diverted fines levied following the Libor banking scandal for the purpose of landscaping and preparing the statue's site.

The commissioning of the statue generated controversy. Opposition was led by the Nightingale Society, and its co-founder Lynn McDonald, the editor of the 16-volume Collected Works of Florence Nightingale. The society's main objection was to what it perceived as the embellishment of Seacole's work and reputation, to the detriment of that of Florence Nightingale. The proposed site for the statue, the grounds of St Thomas', provoked particular hostility, as Seacole had no connection to the hospital while Nightingale had founded her school of nursing there in 1860. In 2013 the controversy became linked to, ultimately unsuccessful, efforts by the then Secretary of State for Education, Michael Gove, to remove mention of Seacole from the English schools National Curriculum. The statue's sculptor, Martin Jennings, noted the substantial length of time it took to raise the necessary funds, contrasting it with the more usual period of around two years, and asked, in an interview in The Guardian newspaper in 2016, "would there really be such energy behind the[..] resistance if the person the statue honours was white-skinned"?

By 2016, work on the statue, cast in the foundry of Pangolin Editions in Gloucestershire, and on its site, was complete. The statue was unveiled on 30 June 2016 by Floella Benjamin. Speaking at the unveiling, Elizabeth Anionwu, Emeritus Professor of Nursing at the University of West London and vice-chair of the appeal committee, referenced the importance of the site and of the statue itself; "There are not enough statues of women, let alone of black women. St Thomas’ are proud to host the statue of Mary Seacole both in recognition of the work done by their black and minority ethnic healthcare staff, and also because of the diverse community they serve".

The statue was vandalised in what was speculated to be a racially-motivated attack in early August 2024, but was announced as restored later that month.
