= Cubah Cornwallis =

Jamaican nurse

Cubah Cornwallis (died 1848) (often spelled Coubah, Couba, Cooba or Cuba a slave name variant of the Twi day name Akua meaning a girl born on Wednesday) was a nurse or "doctress" and Obeah woman who lived in the colony of Jamaica during the late 18th and 19th century.

== Early life ==
Little is known of her early life although records indicate that she was originally enslaved, belonging to Captain William Cornwallis, brother of Charles, Earl Cornwallis. The details of her release from slavery are also not known although there are references suggesting that she and Captain Cornwallis were lovers.

When freed she was appointed by Cornwallis as his housekeeper whilst he remained in Jamaica. On his departure, she settled permanently in Port Royal and began her career treating sailors for the many and varied diseases and injuries they sustained. She purchased a small house which she converted into a combination of rest home, hotel and hospital.

== Famous patients ==
Cubah became so well known for her treatment of the sick that in 1780 when Horatio Nelson, then a captain, fell ill with dysentery during an expedition to Nicaragua, he was taken to her by Admiral Parker, the commander-in-chief of the Royal Naval forces in Jamaica.

Later she was entrusted with the treatment of Prince William Henry, later William IV when he was stationed in the West Indies. The Prince was so grateful to Cubah that many years later he told the story to his wife, Queen Adelaide. The Queen was so grateful that she sent Cubah a dress that was so expensive and beautiful that Cubah refused to wear it. She wore the dress only once in 1848 as her funerary gown.

According to Jamaican mixed-race campaigner and author Richard Hill, Nelson too remarked in his correspondence to friends and family how indebted he was to Cubah. Whenever a friend or colleague was despatched to Jamaica he requested that they pass his good wishes to her.

== Death ==
Although it is not known when she was born, Cubah must have lived a long life. It is documented that she assisted in Nelson's recovery in 1780 and was, by then, already an established and respected figure on the island. Her date of death, 68 years later, is a testament to her longevity.

== Herbal practice ==
Cubah, and other nurses in the West Indies during the period, treated patients with traditional home remedies, often mistaken for magic, religion or witchcraft. Many thought and misunderstood these women to be using magical practices, and they were often feared or respected or loved, depending on the "magic" they cast and the individual over whom they cast it. Their magic was little more than hygiene, a healthier diet than could have been expected on board ship and a positive attitude.

Another contemporary "doctress" of Cubah's was Sarah Adams, who also practised good hygiene and used herbal remedies throughout her long career. Adams also worked in Port Royal, and she died in 1849. Other Jamaican doctresses of the 18th century included Mrs Grant, the mother of Mary Seacole, and Grace Donne, who nursed Jamaica's wealthiest planter, Simon Taylor. Cubah Cornwallis, Mrs Grant, Grace Donne and Sarah Adams used hygienic practices long before it became one of the main planks in the reforms of Florence Nightingale, in her book Notes on Nursing in 1859.
