= Mary Seacole =

Jamaican-British nurse and businesswoman (1805–1881)

The Honourable Mary Seacole OM
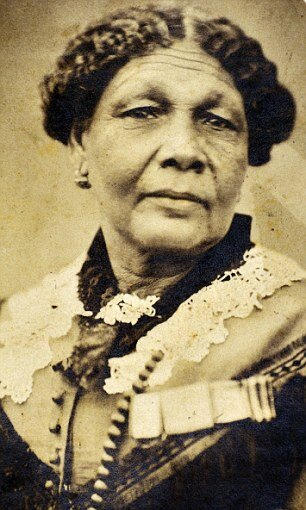
- Seacole, c. 1850
- Born: Mary Jane Grant; 23 November 1805; Kingston, Colony of Jamaica
- Died: 14 May 1881 (aged 75); Paddington, London, England, U.K.
- Other name: Mother Seacole
- Occupations: Hotelier; boarding house keeper; author; world traveller; nurse
- Known for: providing a restaurant for officers during Crimean War
- Spouse: Edwin Seacole (m. 1836; died 1844)
- Honours: Order of Merit (Jamaica; posthumous, 1990)

Mary Jane Seacole (née Grant; 23 November 1805 – 14 May 1881) was a Jamaican nurse and businesswoman. She was famous for her nursing work during the Crimean War and for publishing the first autobiography written by a woman of African descent in Britain.

Seacole was born in Kingston, Jamaica, to a Creole mother who ran a boarding house and had herbalist skills as a "doctress". In 1990, Seacole was (posthumously) awarded the Jamaican Order of Merit. In 2004, she was voted the greatest Black Briton in a survey conducted in 2003 by the black heritage website Every Generation.

Seacole went to the Crimean War in 1855 with the plan of setting up the "British Hotel", as "a mess-table and comfortable quarters for sick and convalescent officers". However, chef Alexis Soyer told her that officers did not need overnight accommodation, so she instead made it into a restaurant/bar/catering service. It proved to be very popular and she and her business partner, a relative of her late husband, did well on it until the end of the war. Her 1857 memoir, Adventures of Mrs Seacole in Many Lands, includes three chapters of the food she served and the encounters she had with officers, some of them high-ranking, and including the commander of the Turkish forces.

Seacole missed the first three major battles of the war, as she was busy in London attending to her gold investments—she had arrived from Panama, where she had provided services for prospectors going overland to and from the California Gold Rush. She gave assistance at the battlefield on three later battles, going out to attend to the fallen after serving wine and sandwiches to spectators.

In her memoir, Seacole described several attempts she made to join that team; however, she did not start her informal inquiries until after both Florence Nightingale and her initial team, and a later one, had left. When Seacole left, it was with the plan of joining her business partner and starting their business. She travelled with two Black employees, her maid Mary, and a porter, Mac.

She was largely forgotten for almost a century after her death. Her autobiography, Wonderful Adventures of Mrs. Seacole in Many Lands (1857), was the first autobiography written by a Black woman in Britain. The erection of a statue of Seacole at St Thomas' Hospital, London, on 30 June 2016, describing her as a "pioneer", generated some controversy and opposition, especially among those concerned with Nightingale's legacy.

== Early career and background ==
Mary Jane Seacole was born Mary Jane Grant on 23 November 1805 in Kingston, in the Colony of Jamaica, as a member of the community of free Black people in Jamaica. She was the daughter of James Grant, a Scottish Lieutenant in the British Army. Her mother, Mrs Grant, nicknamed "The Doctress", was a healer who used traditional Caribbean and African herbal medicines. Mrs Grant also ran Blundell Hall, a boarding house at 7, East Street. (Note: The role of a doctress in Jamaica was a mixture of a nurse, midwife, masseuse and herbalist, drawing strongly on the traditions of Creole medicine. Notable Jamaican doctresses, who practised good hygiene and the use of herbal remedies in 18th-century Jamaica included, alongside Mrs Grant, Cubah Cornwallis, Sarah Adams and Grace Donne, who nursed and cared for Jamaica's wealthiest planter, Simon Taylor.)

In the 18th century, Jamaican doctresses mastered folk medicine, including the use of hygiene and herbs. They had a vast knowledge of tropical diseases, and had a general practitioner's skill in treating ailments and injuries, acquired from having to look after the illnesses of fellow slaves on sugar plantations. At Blundell Hall, Seacole acquired her nursing skills, which included the use of hygiene, ventilation, warmth, hydration, rest, empathy, good nutrition and care for the dying. Blundell Hall also served as a convalescent home for military and naval staff recuperating from illnesses such as cholera and yellow fever.

Seacole's autobiography says she began experimenting in medicine, based on what she learned from her mother, by ministering to a doll and then progressing to pets before helping her mother treat humans. Because of her family's close ties with the army, she was able to observe the practices of military doctors, and combined that knowledge with the West African remedies she acquired from her mother. In Jamaica in the late 18th and early 19th centuries, neonatal deaths were more than a quarter of total births. However, Seacole, using traditional West African herbal remedies and hygienic practices, boasted that she never lost a mother or her child.

Seacole was proud of both her Jamaican and Scottish ancestry and called herself a Creole. (Note: The term 'Creole' was commonly used to refer to the children of parents one of whom was European and the other of Africans or indigenous Americans.) In her autobiography, The Wonderful Adventures of Mrs. Seacole, she writes: "I am a Creole, and have good Scots blood coursing through my veins. My father was a soldier of an old Scottish family." Her biographer Jane Robinson speculates that she may technically have been a quadroon. Seacole emphasises her personal vigour in her autobiography, distancing herself from the contemporary stereotype of the "lazy Creole". She was proud of her Black ancestry, writing, "I have a few shades of deeper brown upon my skin which shows me related – and I am proud of the relationship – to those poor mortals whom you once held enslaved, and whose bodies America still owns."

Seacole spent some years in the household of an elderly woman, whom she called her "kind patroness", before returning to her mother. She was treated as a member of her patroness's family and received a good education. As the educated daughter of a Scottish officer and a free Black woman with a respectable business, Seacole would have held a high position in Jamaican society.

In about 1821, Seacole visited London, staying for a year, and visited her relatives in the merchant Henriques family. Although London had a number of Black people, she records that a companion, a West Indian with skin darker than her own "dusky" shades, was taunted by children. Seacole herself was "only a little brown"; she was nearly white according to one of her biographers, Dr. Ron Ramdin. She returned to London approximately a year later, bringing a "large stock of West Indian pickles and preserves for sale". Her later travels were without a chaperone or sponsor – an unusually independent practice at a time when women had limited rights.

== In the Caribbean, 1826–51 ==
After returning to Jamaica, Seacole cared for her "old indulgent patroness" through an illness, finally returning to the family home at Blundell Hall after the death of her patroness a few years later. Seacole then worked alongside her mother, occasionally being called to provide nursing assistance at the British Army hospital at Up-Park Camp. She also travelled the Caribbean, visiting the British colony of New Providence in the Bahamas, the Spanish colony of Cuba, and the new Republic of Haiti. Seacole records these travels, but omits mention of significant current events, such as the Christmas Rebellion in Jamaica of 1831, the abolition of slavery in 1833, and the abolition of "apprenticeship" in 1838.

She married Edwin Horatio Hamilton Seacole in Kingston on 10 November 1836. Her marriage, from betrothal to widowhood, is described in just nine lines at the conclusion of the first chapter of her autobiography. Robinson reports the legend in the Seacole family that Edwin was an illegitimate son of Lord Nelson and his mistress, Emma Hamilton, who was adopted by Thomas, a local "surgeon, apothecary and man midwife" Seacole's will indicates that Horatio Seacole was Nelson's godson: she left a diamond ring to her friend, Lord Rokeby, "given to my late husband by his godfather Viscount Nelson", but there was no mention of this godson in Nelson's own will or its codicils. Edwin was a merchant and seems to have had a poor constitution. The newly married couple moved to Black River and opened a provisions store which failed to prosper. They returned to Blundell Hall in the early 1840s.

During 1843 and 1844, Seacole suffered a series of personal disasters. She and her family lost much of the boarding house in a fire in Kingston on 29 August 1843. Blundell Hall burned down, and was replaced by New Blundell Hall, which was described as "better than before". Then her husband died in October 1844, followed by her mother. After a period of grief, in which Seacole says she did not stir for days, she composed herself, "turned a bold front to fortune", and assumed the management of her mother's hotel. She put her rapid recovery down to her hot Creole blood, blunting the "sharp edge of [her] grief" sooner than Europeans who she thought "nurse their woe secretly in their hearts".

Seacole absorbed herself in work, declining many offers of marriage. She later became known to the European military visitors to Jamaica who often stayed at Blundell Hall. She treated and nursed patients in the cholera epidemic of 1850, which killed some 32,000 Jamaicans.

== In Central America, 1851–54 ==
In 1850, Seacole's half-brother Edward moved to Cruces, Panama, which was then part of the Republic of New Granada. There, approximately 45 miles (72 km) up the Chagres River from the coast, he followed the family trade by establishing the Independent Hotel to accommodate the many travellers between the eastern and western coasts of the United States. The number of travellers had increased enormously, as part of the 1849 California Gold Rush.

Cruces was the limit of navigability of the Chagres River during the rainy season, which lasts from June to December. Travellers would ride on donkeys approximately 20 miles (32 km) along the Las Cruces trail from Panama City on the Pacific Ocean coast to Cruces, and then 45 miles (72 km) down-river to the Atlantic Ocean at Chagres (or vice versa). In the dry season, the river subsided, and travellers would switch from land to the river a few miles farther downstream, at Gorgona. Most of these settlements have now been submerged by Gatun Lake, formed as part of the Panama Canal.

In 1851, Seacole travelled to Cruces to visit her brother. Shortly after her arrival, the town was struck by cholera, a disease which had reached Panama in 1849. Seacole was on hand to treat the first victim, who survived, which established Seacole's reputation and brought her a succession of patients as the infection spread. The rich paid, but she treated the poor for free. Many, both rich and poor, succumbed. She eschewed opium, preferring mustard rubs and poultices, the laxative calomel (mercurous chloride), sugars of lead (lead(II) acetate), and rehydration with water boiled with cinnamon. While she believed her preparations had moderate success, she faced little competition, the only other treatments coming from a "timid little dentist", who was an inexperienced doctor sent by the Panamanian government, and the Catholic Church.

The epidemic raged through the population. Seacole later expressed exasperation at their feeble resistance, claiming they "bowed down before the plague in slavish despair". She performed an autopsy on an orphan child for whom she had cared, which gave her "decidedly useful" new knowledge. At the end of this epidemic she herself contracted cholera, forcing her to rest for several weeks. In her autobiography, The Wonderful Adventures of Mrs. Seacole in Many Lands, she describes how the residents of Cruces responded: "When it became known that their "yellow doctress" had the cholera, I must do the people of Cruces the justice to say that they gave me plenty of sympathy, and would have shown their regard for me more actively, had there been any occasion."

Cholera was to return again: Ulysses S. Grant passed through Cruces in July 1852, on military duty; a hundred and twenty men, a third of his party, died of the disease there or shortly afterwards en route to Panama City.

Despite the problems of disease and climate, Panama remained the favoured route between the coasts of the United States. Seeing a business opportunity, Seacole opened the British Hotel, which was a restaurant rather than a hotel. She described it as a "tumble down hut," with two rooms, the smaller one to be her bedroom, the larger one to serve up to 50 diners. She soon added the services of a barber.

As the wet season ended in early 1852, Seacole joined other traders in Cruces in packing up to move to Gorgona. She records a white American giving a speech at a leaving dinner in which he wished that "God bless the best yaller woman he ever made" and asked the listeners to join with him in rejoicing that "she's so many shades removed from being entirely Black". He went on to say that "if we could bleach her by any means we would [...] and thus make her acceptable in any company[,] as she deserves to be". Seacole replied firmly that she did not "appreciate your friend's kind wishes with respect to my complexion. If it had been as dark as any nigger's, I should have been just as happy and just as useful, and as much respected by those whose respect I value." She declined the offer of "bleaching" and drank "to you and the general reformation of American manners". Salih notes Seacole's use here of eye dialect, set against her own English, as an implicit inversion of the day's caricatures of "Black talk". Seacole also comments on the positions of responsibility taken on by escaped African-American slaves in Panama, as well as in the priesthood, the army, and public offices, commenting that "it is wonderful to see how freedom and equality elevate men". She also records an antipathy between Panamanians and Americans, which she attributes in part to the fact that so many of the former had once been slaves of the latter.

In Gorgona, Seacole briefly ran a females-only hotel. In late 1852, she travelled home to Jamaica. Already delayed, the journey was further made difficult when she encountered racial discrimination while trying to book passage on an American ship. She was forced to wait for a later British boat. In 1853, soon after arriving home, Seacole was asked by the Jamaican medical authorities to provide nursing care to victims of a severe outbreak of yellow fever. She found that she could do little, because the epidemic was so severe. Her memoirs state that her own boarding house was full of sufferers and she saw many of them die. Although she wrote, "I was sent for by the medical authorities to provide nurses for the sick at Up-Park Camp," she did not claim to bring nurses with her when she went. She left her sister with some friends at her house, went to the camp (about a mile, or 1.6 km, from Kingston), "and did my best, but it was little we could do to mitigate the severity of the epidemic." However, in Cuba Seacole is remembered with great fondness by those she nursed back to health, where she became known as "the Yellow Woman from Jamaica with the cholera medicine".

Seacole returned to Panama in early 1854 to finalise her business affairs, and three months later moved to the New Granada Mining Gold Company establishment at Fort Bowen Mine some 70 miles (110 km) away near Escribanos. The superintendent, Thomas Day, was related to her late husband. Seacole had read newspaper reports of the outbreak of war against Russia before she left Jamaica, and news of the escalating Crimean War reached her in Panama. She determined to travel to England to volunteer as a nurse with experience in herbal healing skills, to experience the "pomp, pride and circumstance of glorious war" as she described it in Chapter I of her autobiography. A part of her reasoning for going to Crimea was that she knew some of the soldiers that were deployed there. In her autobiography she explains how she heard that soldiers whom she had cared for and nursed back to health in the 97th and 48th regiments were being shipped back to England in preparation for the fighting on the Crimean Peninsula.

== Crimean War, 1853–56 ==
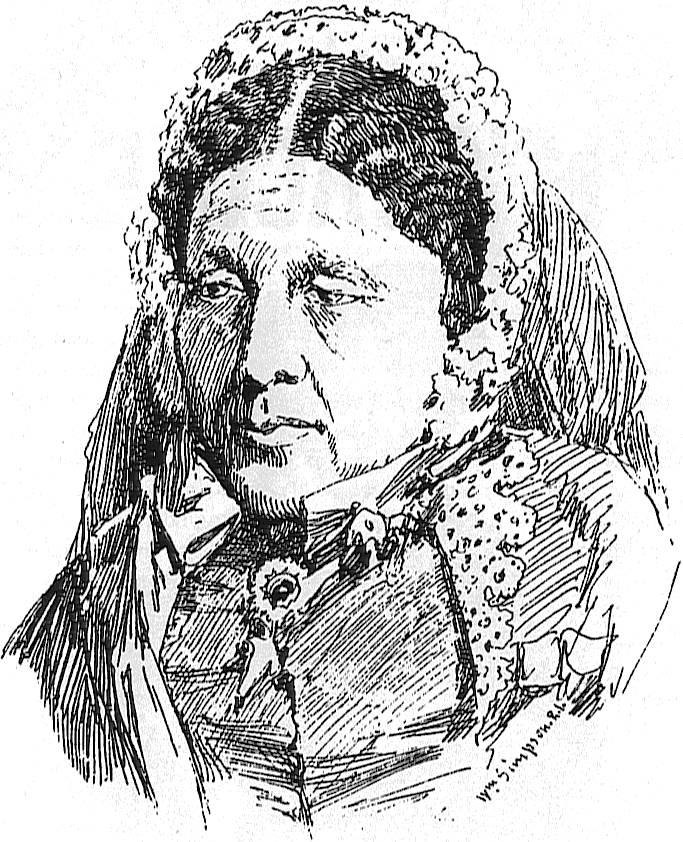
A sketch of Mary Seacole by Crimean war artist William Simpson (1823–1899), c. 1855

The Crimean War lasted from October 1853 until 1 April 1856 and was fought between the Russian Empire and an alliance of the United Kingdom, France, the Kingdom of Sardinia, and the Ottoman Empire. The majority of the conflict took place on the Crimean peninsula in the Black Sea and Turkey.

Many thousands of troops from all the countries involved were drafted to the area, and disease broke out almost immediately. Hundreds perished, mostly from cholera. Hundreds more would die waiting to be shipped out, or on the voyage. Their prospects were little better when they arrived at the poorly staffed, unsanitary and overcrowded hospitals which were the only medical provision for the wounded. In Britain, a trenchant letter in The Times on 14 October 1854 triggered Sidney Herbert, Secretary of State for War, to approach Florence Nightingale to form a detachment of nurses to be sent to the hospital to save lives. Interviews were quickly held, suitable candidates selected, and Nightingale left for Turkey on 21 October.

Seacole travelled from Navy Bay in Panama to England, initially to deal with her investments in gold-mining businesses. She then attempted to join the second contingent of nurses to the Crimea. She applied to the War Office and other government offices, but arrangements for departure were already underway. In her memoir, she wrote that she brought "ample testimony" of her experience in nursing, but the only example officially cited was that of a former medical officer of the West Granada Gold-Mining Company. However, Seacole wrote that this was just one of the testimonials she had in her possession.

Seacole wrote in her autobiography, "Now, I am not for a single instant going to blame the authorities who would not listen to the offer of a motherly yellow woman to go to the Crimea and nurse her ‘sons’ there, suffering from cholera, diarrhœa, and a host of lesser ills. In my country, where people know our use, it would have been different; but here it was natural enough – although I had references, and other voices spoke for me – that they should laugh, good-naturedly enough, at my offer."

Seacole also applied to the Crimean Fund, a fund raised by public subscription to support the wounded in Crimea, for sponsorship to travel there, but she again met with refusal. Seacole questioned whether racism was a factor in her being turned down. She wrote in her autobiography, "Was it possible that American prejudices against colour had some root here? Did these ladies shrink from accepting my aid because my blood flowed beneath a somewhat duskier skin than theirs?" An attempt to join the contingent of nurses was also rebuffed, as she wrote, "Once again I tried, and had an interview this time with one of Miss Nightingale's companions. She gave me the same reply, and I read in her face the fact, that had there been a vacancy, I should not have been chosen to fill it." Seacole did not stop after being rebuffed by the Secretary-at-War, she soon approached his wife, Elizabeth Herbert, who also informed her "that the full complement of nurses had been secured".

Seacole finally resolved to travel to Crimea using her own resources and to open the British Hotel. Business cards were printed and sent ahead to announce her intention to open an establishment, to be called the "British Hotel", near Balaclava, which would be "a mess-table and comfortable quarters for sick and convalescent officers". Shortly afterwards, her Caribbean acquaintance, Thomas Day, arrived unexpectedly in London, and the two formed a partnership. They assembled a stock of supplies, and Seacole embarked on the Dutch screw-steamer Hollander on 27 January 1855 on its maiden voyage, to Constantinople. The ship called at Malta, where Seacole encountered a doctor who had recently left Scutari. He wrote her a letter of introduction to Nightingale.

Seacole visited Nightingale at the Barrack Hospital in Scutari, where she asked for a bed for the night. Seacole wrote of Selina Bracebridge, an assistant of Nightingale, "Mrs. B. questions me very kindly, but with the same look of curiosity and surprise. What object has Mrs. Seacole in coming out? This is the purport of her questions. And I say, frankly, to be of use somewhere; for other considerations I had not, until necessity forced them upon me. Willingly, had they accepted me, I would have worked for the wounded, in return for bread and water. I fancy Mrs. B— thought that I sought for employment at Scutari, for she said, very kindly – "Miss Nightingale has the entire management of our hospital staff, but I do not think that any vacancy – "

Seacole informed Bracebridge that she intended to travel to Balaclava the next day to join her business partner. She reports that her meeting with Nightingale was friendly, with Nightingale asking "What do you want, Mrs. Seacole? Anything we can do for you? If it lies in my power, I shall be very happy." Seacole told her of her "dread of the night journey by caïque" and the improbability of being able to find the Hollander in the dark. A bed was then found for her and breakfast sent her in the morning, with a "kind message" from Bracebridge. A footnote in the memoir states that Seacole subsequently "saw much of Miss Nightingale at Balaclava," but no further meetings are recorded in the text.

After transferring most of her stores to the transport ship Albatross, with the remainder following on the Nonpareil, she set out on the four-day voyage to the British bridgehead into Crimea at Balaclava. Lacking proper building materials, Seacole gathered abandoned metal and wood in her spare moments, with a view to using the debris to build her hotel. She found a site for the hotel at a place she christened Spring Hill, near Kadikoi, some 3 1/2 miles (5.6 km) along the main British supply road from Balaclava to the British camp near Sevastopol, and within a mile of the British headquarters.

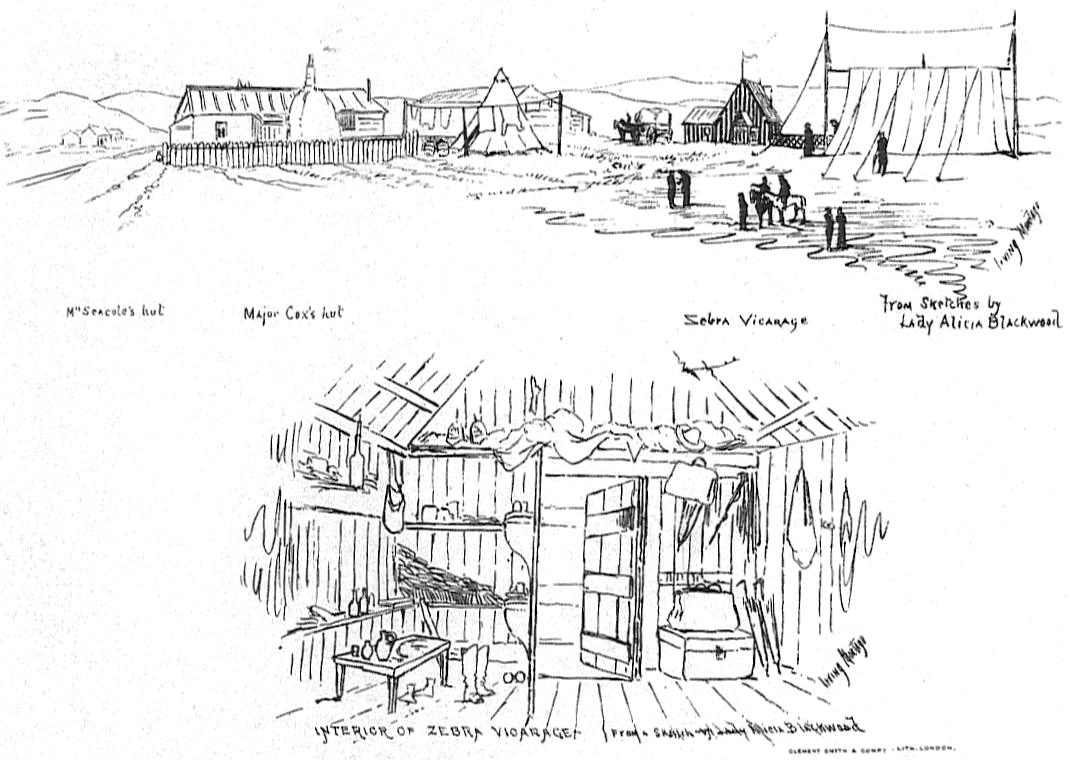
A sketch of Mary Seacole's British Hotel in Crimea, by Lady Alicia Blackwood (1818–1913), a friend of Florence Nightingale's who resided in the neighbouring "Zebra Vicarage"

The hotel was built from the salvaged driftwood, packing cases, iron sheets, and salvaged architectural items such as glass doors and window-frames, from the village of Kamara, using hired local labour. The new British Hotel opened in March 1855. An early visitor was Alexis Soyer, a noted French chef who had travelled to Crimea to help improve the diet of British soldiers. He records meeting Seacole in his 1857 work A Culinary Campaign and describes Seacole as "an old dame of a jovial appearance, but a few shades darker than the white lily". Seacole requested Soyer's advice on how to manage her business, and was advised to concentrate on food and beverage service, and not to have beds for visitors because the few either slept on board ships in the harbour or in tents in the camp.

The hotel was completed in July at a total cost of £800. It included a building made of iron, containing a main room with counters and shelves and storage above, an attached kitchen, two wooden sleeping huts, outhouses, and an enclosed stable-yard. The building was stocked with provisions shipped from London and Constantinople, as well as local purchases from the British camp near Kadikoi and the French camp at nearby Kamiesch. Seacole sold anything – "from a needle to an anchor"—to army officers and visiting sightseers. Meals were served at the hotel, cooked by two Black cooks, and the kitchen also provided outside catering.

Despite constant thefts, particularly of livestock, Seacole's establishment prospered. Chapter XIV of Wonderful Adventures describes the meals and supplies provided to officers. They were closed at 8 pm daily and on Sundays. Seacole did some of the cooking herself: "Whenever I had a few leisure moments, I used to wash my hands, roll up my sleeves, and roll out pastry." When called to "dispense medications," she did so. Soyer was a frequent visitor, and praised Seacole's offerings, noting that she offered him champagne on his first visit.

To Soyer, near the time of departure, Florence Nightingale acknowledged favourable views of Seacole, consistent with their one known meeting in Scutari. Soyer's remarks—he knew both women—show pleasantness on both sides. Seacole told him of her encounter with Nightingale at the Barrack Hospital: "You must know, M Soyer, that Miss Nightingale is very fond of me. When I passed through Scutari, she very kindly gave me board and lodging." When he related Seacole's inquiries to Nightingale, she replied "with a smile: 'I should like to see her before she leaves, as I hear she has done a deal of good for the poor soldiers.'" Nightingale, however, did not want her nurses associating with Seacole, as she wrote to her brother-in-law. In this letter, Nightingale reportedly wrote, "I had the greatest difficulty in repelling Mrs Seacole's advances, and in preventing association between her and my nurses (absolutely out of the question!)...Anyone who employs Mrs Seacole will introduce much kindness - also much drunkenness and improper conduct".

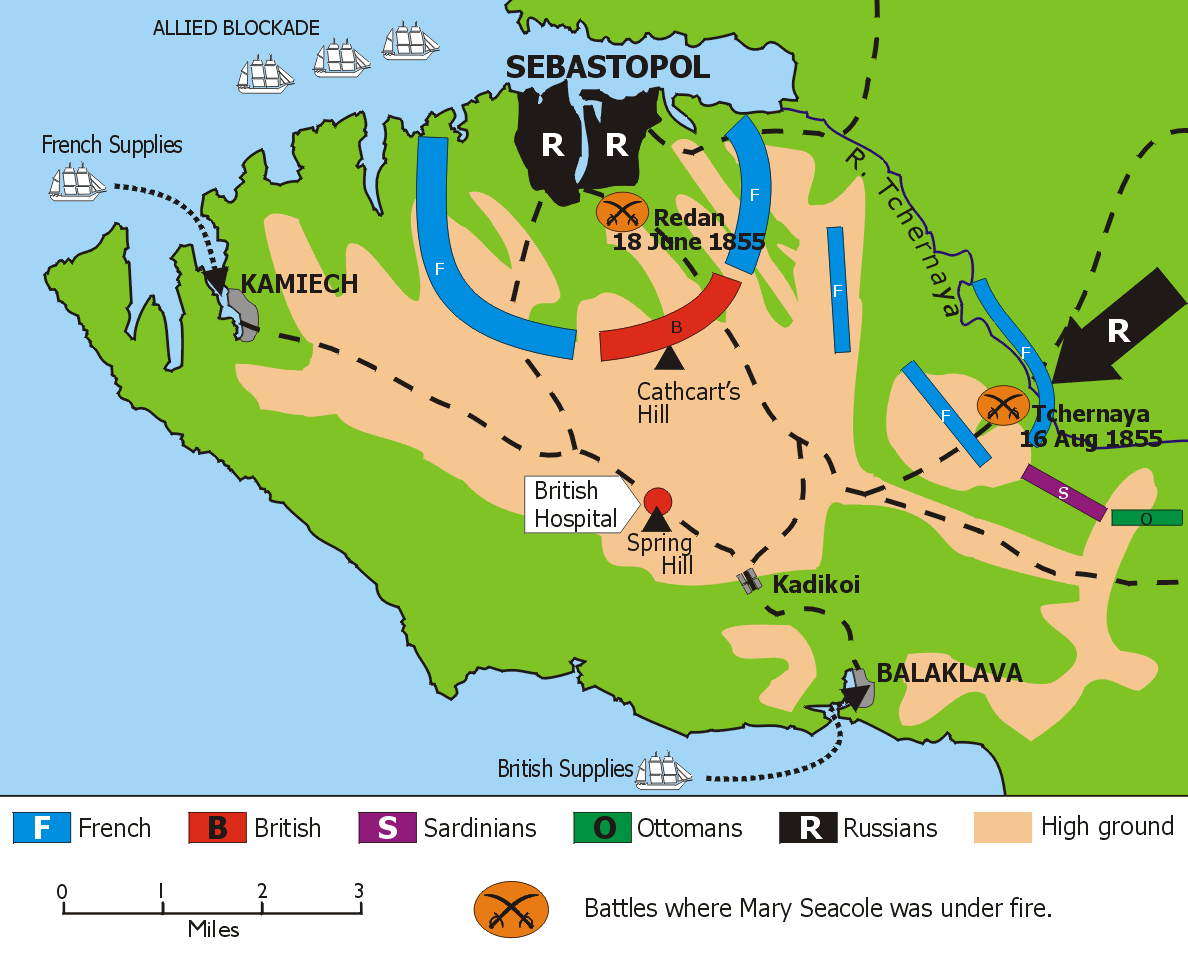
A map illustrating Seacole's involvement in the Crimean War

Seacole often went out to the troops as a sutler, selling her provisions near the British camp at Kadikoi, and nursing casualties brought out from the trenches around Sevastopol or from the Tchernaya valley. She was widely known to the British Army as "Mother Seacole".

Apart from serving officers at the British Hotel, Seacole also provided catering for spectators at the battles, and spent time on Cathcart's Hill, some 3 1/2 miles (5.6 km) north of the British Hotel, as an observer. On one occasion, attending wounded troops under fire, she dislocated her right thumb, an injury which never healed entirely. In a dispatch written on 14 September 1855, William Howard Russell, special correspondent of The Times, wrote that she was a "warm and successful physician, who doctors and cures all manner of men with extraordinary success. She is always in attendance near the battlefield to aid the wounded and has earned many a poor fellow's blessing." Russell also wrote that she "redeemed the name of sutler", and another that she was "both a Miss Nightingale and a [chef]". Seacole made a point of wearing brightly coloured, and highly conspicuous, clothing—often bright blue, or yellow, with ribbons in contrasting colours. While Lady Alicia Blackwood later recalled that Seacole had "... personally spared no pains and no exertion to visit the field of woe, and minister with her own hands such things as could comfort or alleviate the suffering of those around her; freely giving to such as could not pay ...".

Her peers, though wary at first, soon found out how important Seacole was for both medical assistance and morale. One British medical officer described Seacole in his memoir as "The acquaintance of a celebrated person, Mrs. Seacole, a coloured women who out of the goodness of her heart and at her own expense, supplied hot tea to the poor sufferers [wounded men being transported from the peninsula to the hospital at Scutari ] while they are waiting to be lifted into the boats…. She did not spare herself if she could do any good to the suffering soldiers. In rain and snow, in storm and tempest, day after day she was at her self-chosen post with her stove and kettle, in any shelter she could find, brewing tea for all who wanted it, and they were many. Sometimes more than 200 sick would be embarked in one day, but Mrs. Seacole was always equal, to the occasion".

In late August, Seacole was on the route to Cathcart's Hill for the final assault on Sevastopol on 7 September 1855. French troops led the storming, but the British were beaten back. By dawn on Sunday 9 September, the city was burning out of control, and it was clear that it had fallen: the Russians retreated to fortifications to the north of the harbour. Later in the day, Seacole fulfilled a bet, and became the first British woman to enter Sevastopol after it fell. Having obtained a pass, she toured the broken town, bearing refreshments and visiting the crowded hospital by the docks, containing thousands of dead and dying Russians. Her foreign appearance led to her being stopped by French looters, but she was rescued by a passing officer. She looted some items from the city, including a church bell, an altar candle, and a three-metre (10 ft) long painting of the Madonna.

After the fall of Sevastopol, hostilities continued in a desultory fashion. The business of Seacole and Day prospered in the interim period, with the officers taking the opportunity to enjoy themselves in the quieter days. There were theatrical performances and horse-racing events for which Seacole provided catering.

Seacole was joined by a 14-year-old girl, Sarah, also known as Sally. Soyer described her as "the Egyptian beauty, Mrs Seacole's daughter Sarah", with blue eyes and dark hair. Nightingale alleged that Sarah was the illegitimate offspring of Seacole and Colonel Henry Bunbury. However, there is no evidence that Bunbury met Seacole, or even visited Jamaica, at a time when she would have been nursing her ailing husband. Ramdin speculates that Thomas Day could have been Sarah's father, pointing to the unlikely coincidences of their meeting in Panama and then in England, and their unusual business partnership in Crimea.

Peace talks began in Paris in early 1856, and friendly relations opened between the Allies and the Russians, with a lively trade across the River Tchernaya. The Treaty of Paris was signed on 30 March 1856, after which the soldiers left Crimea. Seacole was in a difficult financial position, her business was full of unsaleable provisions, new goods were arriving daily, and creditors were demanding payment. She attempted to sell as much as possible before the soldiers left, but she was forced to auction many expensive goods for lower-than-expected prices to the Russians who were returning to their homes. The evacuation of the Allied armies was formally completed at Balaclava on 9 July 1856, with Seacole "... conspicuous in the foreground ... dressed in a plaid riding-habit ...".

Seacole was one of the last to leave Crimea, returning to England "poorer than [she] left it". Though she had left poorer, her impact on the soldiers was invaluable to the soldiers she treated, changing their perceptions about her as described in the Illustrated London News: "Perhaps at first the authorities looked askant at the woman-volunteer; but they soon found her worth and utility; and from that time until the British army left the Crimea, Mother Seacole was a household word in the camp...In her store on Spring Hill she attended many patients, cared for many sick, and earned the good will and gratitude of hundreds".

Sociology professor Lynn McDonald is co-founder of The Nightingale Society, which promotes the legacy of Nightingale, who did not see eye-to-eye with Seacole. McDonald believes that Seacole's role in the Crimean War was overplayed:

Mary Seacole, although never the "Black British nurse" she is claimed to have been, was a successful mixed-race immigrant to Britain. She led an adventurous life, and her memoir of 1857 is still a lively read. She was kind and generous. She made friends of her customers, army and navy officers, who came to her rescue with a fund when she was declared bankrupt. While her cures have been vastly exaggerated, she doubtless did what she could to ease suffering, when no effective cures existed. In epidemics pre-Crimea, she said a comforting word to the dying and closed the eyes of the dead. During the Crimean War, probably her greatest kindness was to serve hot tea and lemonade to cold, suffering soldiers awaiting transport to hospital on the wharf at Balaclava. She deserves much credit for rising to the occasion, but her tea and lemonade did not save lives, pioneer nursing or advance health care.

However, historians maintain that claims dismissing Seacole's work as mainly "tea and lemonade" do a disservice to the tradition of Jamaican "doctresses", such as Seacole's mother, Cubah Cornwallis, Sarah Adams and Grace Donne, who all used herbal remedies and hygienic practices in the late eighteenth century, long before Nightingale took up the mantle. Social historian Jane Robinson argues in her book Mary Seacole: The Black Woman who invented Modern Nursing that Seacole was a huge success, and she became known and loved by everyone from the rank and file to the royal family. Mark Bostridge pointed out that Seacole's experience far outstripped Nightingale's, and that the Jamaican's work comprised preparing medicines, diagnosis, and minor surgery. The Times war correspondent William Howard Russell spoke highly of Seacole's skill as a healer, writing "A more tender or skilful hand about a wound or a broken limb could not be found among our best surgeons."

Seacole is featured in the Ministry of Defence brochure "We were there". The subject of the publication is the contribution of ethnic minorities to Great Britain in times of war.

== Back in London, 1856–60 ==
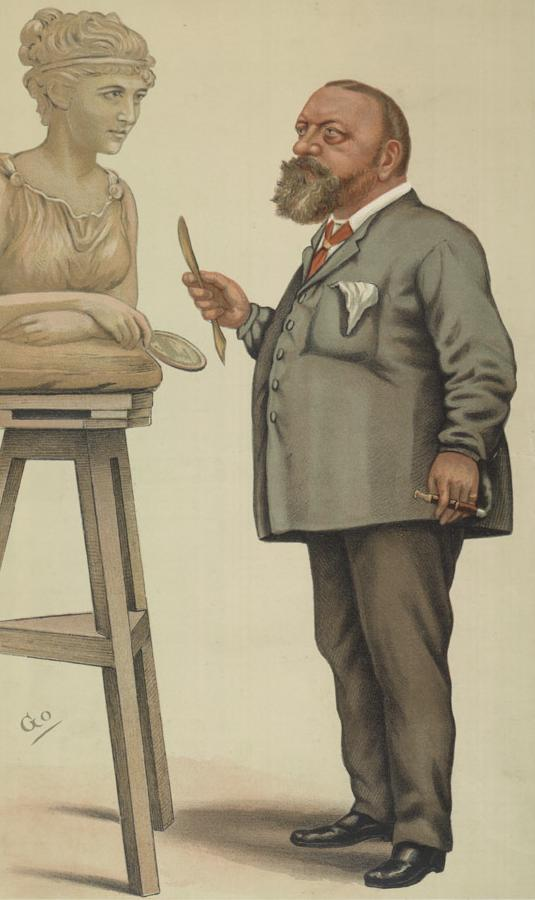
Seacole was bankrupt on her return to London. Queen Victoria's nephew Count Gleichen (above) had become a friend of Seacole's in Crimea. He supported fund-raising efforts on her behalf.

After the end of the war, Seacole returned to England destitute and in poor health. In the conclusion to her autobiography, she records that she "took the opportunity" to visit "yet other lands" on her return journey, although Robinson attributes this to her impecunious state requiring a roundabout trip. She arrived in August 1856 and opened a canteen with Day at Aldershot, but the venture failed through lack of funds. She attended a celebratory dinner for 2,000 soldiers at Royal Surrey Gardens in Kennington on 25 August 1856, at which Nightingale was chief guest of honour.

Reports in The Times on 26 August and News of the World on 31 August indicate that Seacole was also fêted by the huge crowds, with two "burly" sergeants protecting her from the pressure of the crowd. Creditors who had supplied her firm in Crimea were in pursuit. She was forced to move to 1, Tavistock Street, Covent Garden, in increasingly dire financial straits. The Bankruptcy Court in Basinghall Street declared her bankrupt on 7 November 1856. Robinson speculates that Seacole's business problems may have been caused in part by her partner, Day, who dabbled in horse trading and may have set up as an unofficial bank, cashing debts.

At about this time, Seacole began to wear military medals. These are mentioned in an account of her appearance in the bankruptcy court in November 1856. A bust by George Kelly, based on an original by Count Gleichen from around 1871, depicts her wearing four medals, three of which have been identified as the British Crimea Medal, the French Légion d'honneur and the Turkish Order of the Medjidie medal. Robinson says that one is "apparently" a Sardinian award (Sardinia having joined Britain and France in supporting Turkey against Russia in the war). The Jamaican Daily Gleaner stated in her obituary on 9 June 1881 that she had also received a Russian medal, but it has not been identified. However, no formal notice of her award exists in the London Gazette, and it seems unlikely that Seacole was formally rewarded for her actions in Crimea; rather, she may have bought miniature or "dress" medals to display her support and affection for her "sons" in the Army.

Seacole's plight was highlighted in the British press. As a consequence a fund was set up, to which many prominent people donated money, and on 30 January 1857, she and Day were granted certificates discharging them from bankruptcy. Day left for the Antipodes to seek new opportunities, but Seacole's funds remained low. She moved from Tavistock Street to cheaper lodgings at 14 Soho Square in early 1857, triggering a plea for subscriptions from Punch on 2 May. However, in Punch's 30 May edition, she was heavily criticised for a letter she sent begging her favorite magazine, which she claimed to have often read to her British Crimean War patients, to assist her in gaining donations. After quoting her letter in full the magazine provides a satiric cartoon of the activity she describes, captioned "Our Own Vivandière," describing Seacole as a female sutler. The article observes: "It will be evident, from the foregoing, that Mother Seacole has sunk much lower in the world, and is also in danger of rising much higher in it, than is consistent with the honour of the British army, and the generosity of the British public." While urging the public to donate, the commentary's tone can be read as ironic: "Who would give a guinea to see a mimic-sutler woman, and a foreigner, frisk and amble about on the stage, when he might bestow the money on a genuine English one, reduced to a two-pair back, and in imminent danger of being obliged to climb into an attic?"

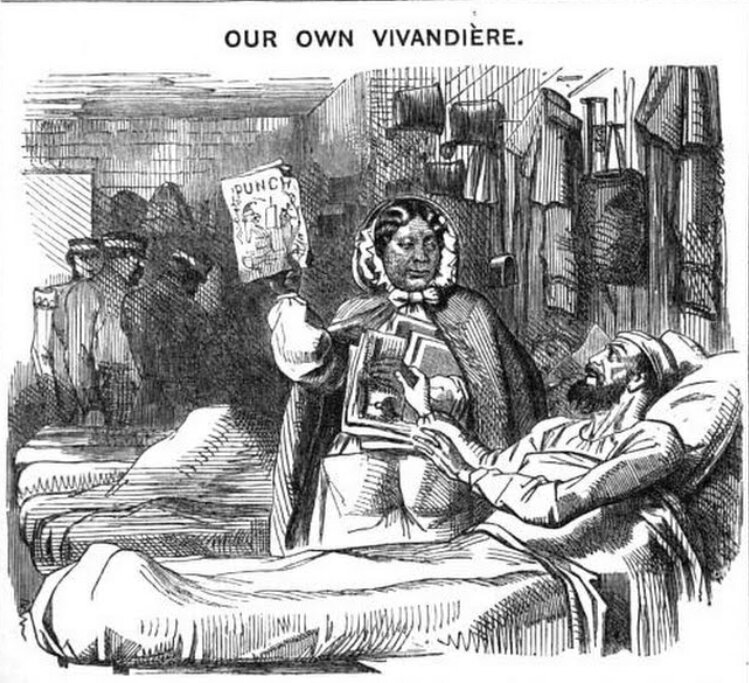
Seacole, depicted as an admirer of Punch, along with her British Crimean War patients in "Our Own Vivandière", Punch, 30 May 1857

In researching his biography of Florence Nightingale, the first major biography in fifty years, Mark Bostridge uncovered a letter in the archive at the home of Nightingale's sister Parthenope Verney, which showed that Nightingale had made a contribution to Seacole's fund, indicating that she saw value at that time in Seacole's work in the Crimea. Further fund-raising and literary mentions kept Seacole in the public eye. In May 1857 she wanted to travel to India, to minister to the wounded of the Indian Rebellion of 1857, but she was dissuaded by both the new Secretary of War, Lord Panmure, and her financial troubles. Fund-raising activities included the "Seacole Fund Grand Military Festival", which was held at the Royal Surrey Gardens, from Monday 27 July to Thursday 30 July 1857. This successful event was supported by many military men, including Major General Lord Rokeby (who had commanded the 1st Division in Crimea) and Lord George Paget; more than 1,000 artists performed, including 11 military bands and an orchestra conducted by Louis Antoine Jullien, which was attended by a crowd of circa 40,000. The one-shilling entrance charge was quintupled for the first night, and halved for the Tuesday performance. However, production costs had been high and the Royal Surrey Gardens Company was itself having financial problems. It became insolvent immediately after the festival, and as a result Seacole only received £57, one quarter of the profits from the event. When eventually the financial affairs of the ruined Company were resolved, in March 1858, the Indian Mutiny was over. Writing of his 1859 journey to the West Indies, the British novelist Anthony Trollope described visiting Mrs. Seacole's sister's hotel in Kingston in his The West Indies and the Spanish Main (Chapman & Hall, 1859). Besides remarking on the pride of the servants and their firm insistence that they be treated politely by guests, Trollope remarked that his hostess, "though clean and reasonable in her charges, clung with touching tenderness to the idea that beefsteak and onions, and bread and cheese and beer, comprised the only diet proper to an Englishman."

In 1860, Mary Seacole converted to Roman Catholicism.

== Wonderful Adventures of Mrs. Seacole in Many Lands ==
A 200-page autobiographical account of her travels was published in July 1857 by James Blackwood as Wonderful Adventures of Mrs. Seacole in Many Lands, the first autobiography written by a Black woman in Britain. Priced at one shilling and six pence (1/6) a copy, the cover bears a portrait of Seacole in red, yellow and black ink. Robinson speculates that she dictated the work to an editor, identified in the book only as W.J.S., who improved her grammar and orthography. In the work Seacole deals with the first 39 years of her life in one short chapter. She then expends six chapters on her few years in Panama, before using the following 12 chapters to detail her exploits in Crimea. She avoids mention of the names of her parents and precise date of birth.

In the first chapter, Seacole talks about how her practice of medicine began on animals, such as cats and dogs. Most of the animals caught diseases from their owners, and she would cure them with homemade remedies. Within the book, Seacole discusses how when she returned from the Crimean War she was poor, whereas others in her same position returned to England rich. Seacole shares the respect she gained from the men in the Crimean War. The soldiers would refer to her as "mother" and would ensure her safety by personally guarding her on the battlefield. A short final "Conclusion" deals with her return to England, and lists supporters of her fund-raising effort, including Rokeby, Prince Edward of Saxe-Weimar, the Duke of Wellington, the Duke of Newcastle, William Russell, and other prominent men in the military. Also within the Conclusion, she describes all of her career adventures experienced in the Crimean War as pride and pleasure. The book was dedicated to Major-General Lord Rokeby, commander of the First Division. In a brief preface, the Times correspondent William Howard Russell wrote, "I have witnessed her devotion and her courage ... and I trust that England will never forget one who has nursed her sick, who sought out her wounded to aid and succour them and who performed the last offices for some of her illustrious dead."

The Illustrated London News received the autobiography favourably, agreeing with the statements made in the preface: "If singleness of heart, true charity and Christian works – of trials and sufferings, dangers and perils, encountered boldly by a helpless women on her errand of mercy in the camp and in the battlefield can excite sympathy or move curiosity, Mary Seacole will have many friends and many readers."

In 2017 Robert McCrum chose it as one of the 100 best nonfiction books, calling it "gloriously entertaining".

== Later life, 1860–81 ==
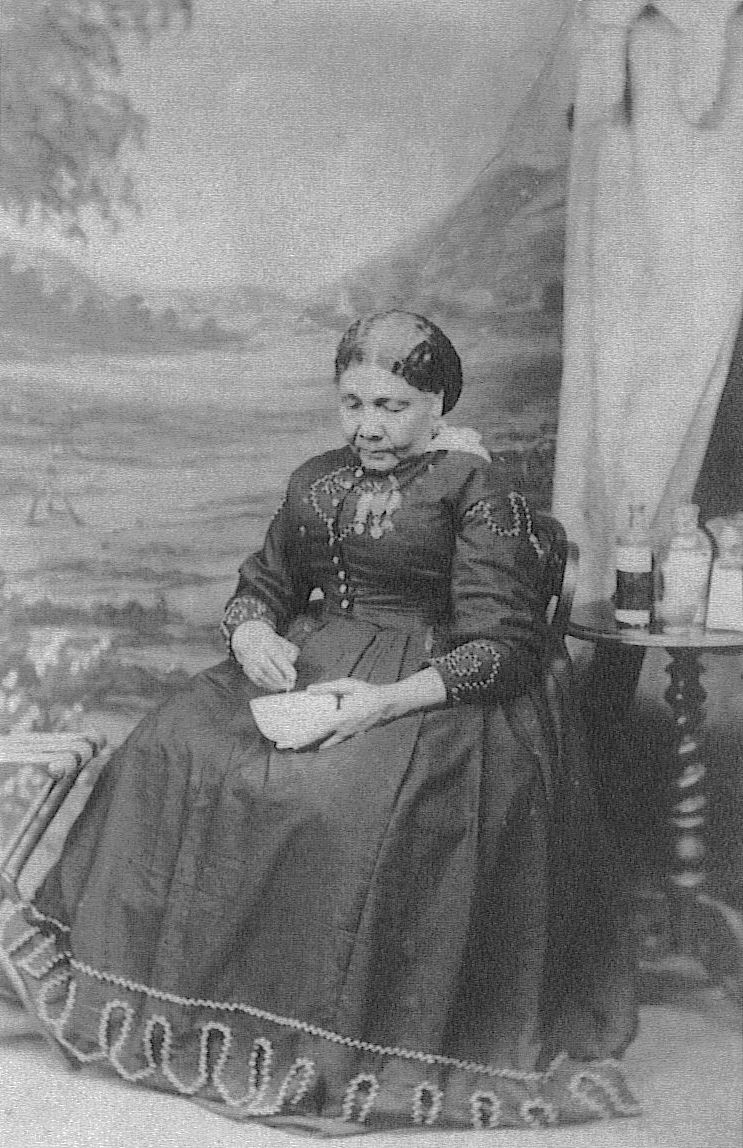
One of two known photographs of Seacole, taken for a carte de visite by Maull & Company in London (c. 1873)

Seacole joined the Catholic Church in 1860, and returned to a Jamaica changed in her absence as it faced economic downturn. She became a prominent figure in the country. However, by 1867 she was again running short of money, and the Seacole fund was resurrected in London, with new patrons including the Prince of Wales, the Duke of Edinburgh, the Duke of Cambridge, and many other senior military officers. The fund burgeoned, and Seacole was able to buy land on Duke Street in Kingston, near New Blundell Hall, where she built a bungalow as her new home, plus a larger property to rent out.

By 1870, Seacole was back in London, living at 40 Upper Berkley Street, St. Marylebone. Robinson speculates that she was drawn back by the prospect of rendering medical assistance in the Franco-Prussian War. It seems likely that she approached Sir Harry Verney (the husband of Florence Nightingale's sister Parthenope) Member of Parliament for Buckingham who was closely involved in the British National Society for the Relief of the Sick and Wounded. It was at this time Nightingale wrote her letter to Verney insinuating that Seacole had kept a "bad house" in Crimea, and was responsible for "much drunkenness and improper conduct".

In London, Seacole joined the periphery of the royal circle. Prince Victor (a nephew of Queen Victoria; as a young Lieutenant he had been one of Seacole's customers in Crimea) carved a marble bust of her in 1871 that was exhibited at the Royal Academy summer exhibition in 1872. Seacole also became personal masseuse to the Princess of Wales who suffered with white leg and rheumatism.

In the census of 3 April 1881, Seacole is listed as a boarder at 3 Cambridge Street, Paddington. Seacole died on 14 May 1881 at her home, 3 Cambridge Street (later renamed Kendal Street) in Paddington, London. The cause of death was noted as "apoplexy".

She left an estate valued at more than £2,500. After some specific legacies, many of exactly 19 guineas, the main beneficiary of her will was her sister, (Eliza) Louisa. Lord Rokeby, Colonel Hussey Fane Keane, and Count Gleichen (three trustees of her Fund) were each left £50; Count Gleichen also received a diamond ring, said to have been given to Seacole's late husband by Lord Nelson. A short obituary was published in The Times on 21 May 1881. She was buried in St. Mary's Catholic Cemetery, Harrow Road, Kensal Green, London.

== Recognition ==
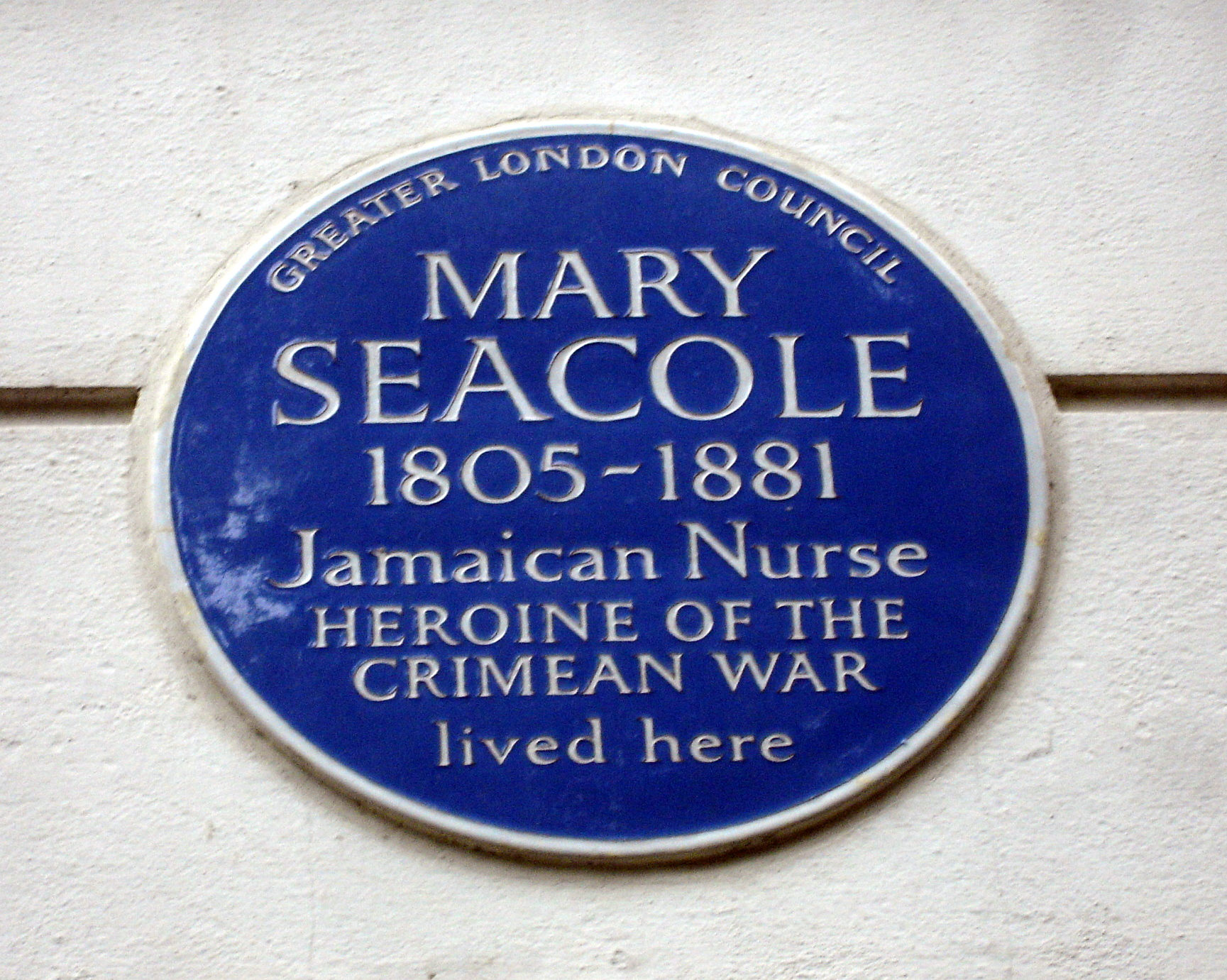
Commemorative plaque at 14 Soho Square, London, W1

While well known at the end of her life, Seacole rapidly faded from public memory in Britain. She has been better remembered in Jamaica, where significant buildings were named after her in the 1950s: the headquarters of the Jamaican General Trained Nurses' Association was christened "Mary Seacole House" in 1954, followed quickly by the naming of a hall of residence of the University of the West Indies in Mona, Jamaica, and a ward at Kingston Public Hospital was also named in her memory. More than a century after her death, Seacole was posthumously awarded the Jamaican Order of Merit in 1990.

Her grave in London was rediscovered in 1973 by the Jamaican Nurses Association. A service of reconsecration was held on 20 November 1973, and her gravestone was also restored by the British Commonwealth Nurses' War Memorial Fund and the Lignum Vitae Club. Nonetheless, when scholarly and popular works were written in the 1970s about the Black British presence in Britain, she was absent from the historical record, and went unrecorded by Dominican-born scholar Edward Scobie and Nigerian historian Sebastian Okechukwu Mezu.

The centenary of her death was celebrated with a memorial service on 14 May 1981 and the grave is maintained by the Mary Seacole Memorial Association, an organization founded in 1980 by Jamaican-British Auxiliary Territorial Service corporal, Connie Mark. A blue plaque was erected by the Greater London Council at her residence in 157 George Street, Westminster, on 9 March 1985, but it was removed in 1998 before the site was redeveloped. A "green plaque" was unveiled at the site of 157 George Street - 147 George Street - on 11 October 2005. The original GLC blue plaque was salvaged and repositioned at 14 Soho Square, where she lived in 1857, by English Heritage in 2007.

By the 21st century, Seacole was much more prominent. Several buildings and entities, mainly connected with health care, were named after her. She is the namesake of Seacole Way in Shrewsbury, part of the Copthorne Grange housing estate developed in 2011–12 on site of the former Copthorne Hospital, near the present Royal Shrewsbury Hospital. In 2005, British politician Boris Johnson wrote of learning about Seacole from his daughter's school pageant and speculated: "I find myself facing the grim possibility that it was my own education that was blinkered, and that my children are now receiving a more faithful account of heroism in imperial Britain than I did." In 2007 Seacole was introduced into the National Curriculum, and her life story is taught at many primary schools in the UK alongside that of Florence Nightingale.

In 2004, she was voted into first place in an online poll of 100 Great Black Britons carried out by the website Every Generation. The portrait identified as Seacole in 2005 was used for one of ten first-class stamps showing important Britons, to commemorate the 150th anniversary of the National Portrait Gallery.

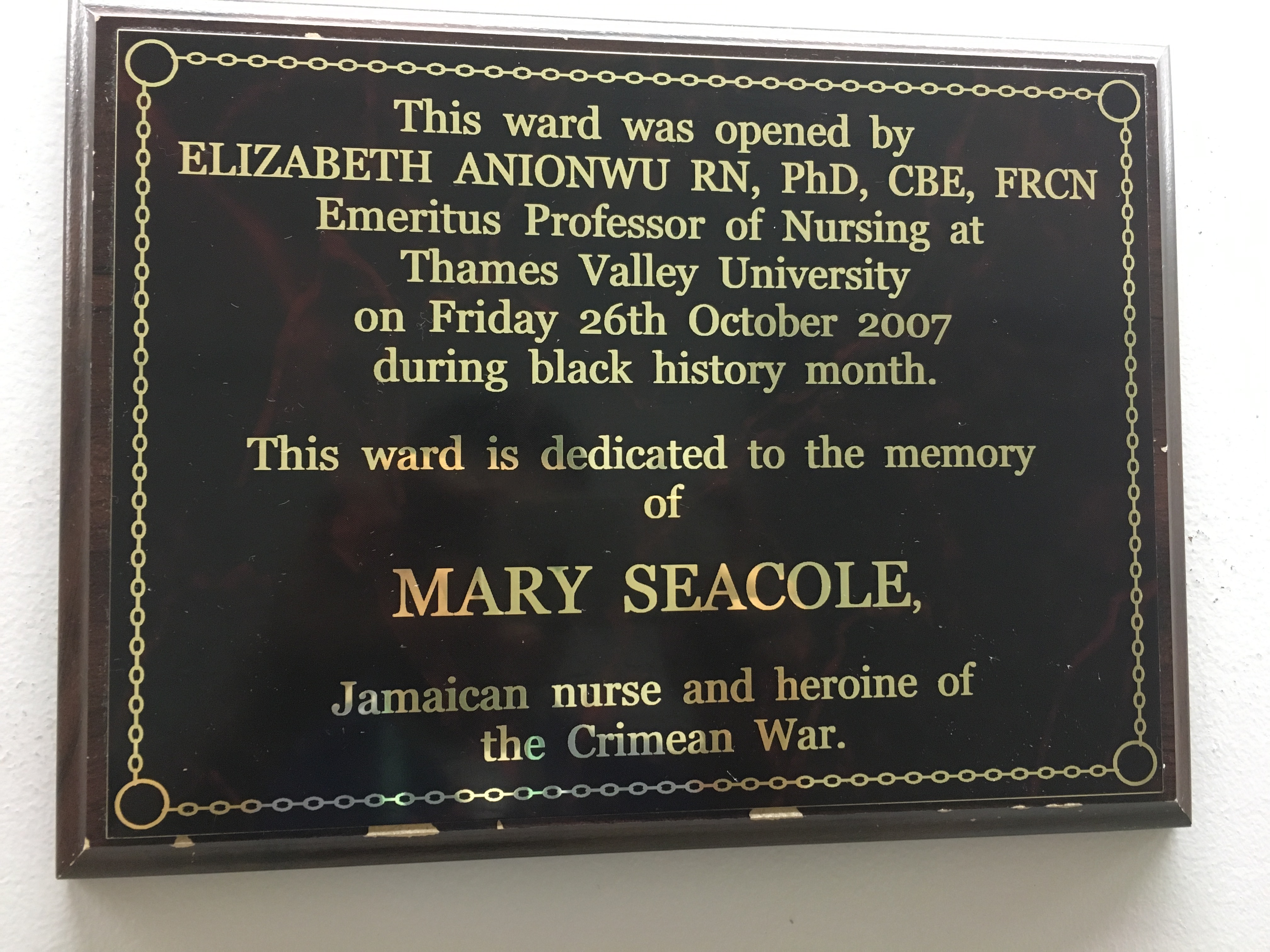
A ward named after Mary Seacole in Whittington Hospital in North London

British buildings and organisations now commemorate her by name. One of the first was the Mary Seacole Centre for Nursing Practice at Thames Valley University, which created the NHS Specialist Library for Ethnicity and Health, a web-based collection of research-based evidence and good practice information relating to the health needs of minority ethnic groups, and other resources relevant to multi-cultural health care.

There is another Mary Seacole Research Centre, at De Montfort University in Leicester. A problem-based learning room at St George's, University of London is named after her. Brunel University of London houses its Department of Health Sciences in the Mary Seacole Building. New buildings at the University of Salford and Birmingham City University bear her name, as does part of the new headquarters of the Home Office at 2 Marsham Street.

There is a Mary Seacole ward in the Douglas Bader Centre in Roehampton. There are two wards named after Mary Seacole in Whittington Hospital in North London. There is the Mary Seacole Nursing Home, situated at 39 Nuttall Street, Shoreditch. The Royal South Hants Hospital in Southampton named its outpatients' wing "The Mary Seacole Wing" in 2010, in honour of her contribution to nursing.

The NHS Seacole Centre in Surrey was opened in May 2020, following a campaign led by Patrick Vernon, a former NHS manager. It is a community hospital which will first provide a temporary rehabilitation service for patients recovering from COVID-19. The building was previously called Headley Court.

An annual prize to recognise and develop leadership in nurses, midwives and health visitors in the National Health Service was named Seacole, to "acknowledge her achievements". The NHS Leadership Academy has developed a six-month leadership course called the Mary Seacole Programme, which is designed for first time leaders in healthcare. An exhibition to celebrate the bicentenary of her birth opened at the Florence Nightingale Museum in London in March 2005. Originally scheduled to last for a few months, the exhibition was so popular that it was extended to March 2007.

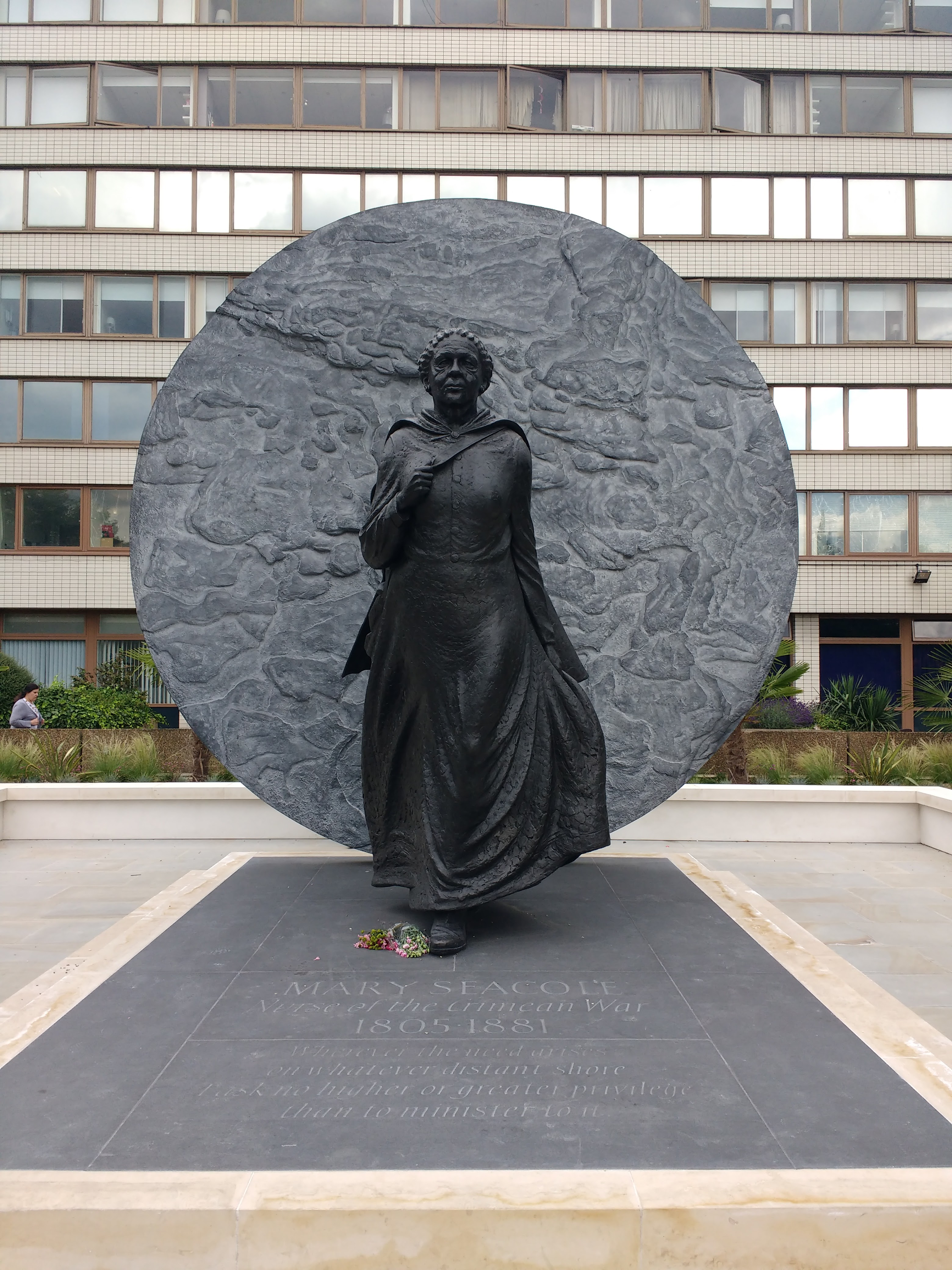
The Statue of Mary Seacole at St Thomas' Hospital, London, by Martin Jennings

A campaign to erect a statue of Seacole in London was launched in November 2003, chaired by Clive Soley, Baron Soley. The design of the sculpture by Martin Jennings was announced in June 2009. There was significant opposition to the siting of the statue at the entrance of St Thomas' Hospital, but it was unveiled on 30 June 2016. The words written by Russell in The Times in 1857 are etched on to Seacole's statue: "I trust that England will not forget one who nursed her sick, who sought out her wounded to aid and succour them, and who performed the last offices for some of her illustrious dead." The making of the Jennings statue was recorded in the ITV documentary David Harewood: In the Shadow of Mary Seacole (2016) along with her life story.

A short animation about Mary Seacole was adapted from a book entitled Mother Seacole, published in 2005 as part of the bicentenary celebrations. Seacole was featured in BBC's 2009 series, Horrible Histories, where she is portrayed by Dominique Moore. Viewer complaints about the show led the BBC Trust to conclude that the episode's portrayal of "racial issues was materially inaccurate". A biopic of her life was proposed in 2019 by Racing Green Pictures and producer Billy Peterson, with Gugu Mbatha-Raw as Mary Seacole. It was intended to release the film in 2020.

A two-dimensional sculpture of Seacole was erected in Paddington in 2013. On 14 October 2016, Google celebrated her with a Google Doodle.

=== Controversy ===
Seacole's recognition is seen as controversial, particularly by members of the Nightingale Society, an organization founded by Sociology professor Lynn McDonald in 2012 to "[promote] knowledge of the great contribution to nursing and public health reform made by Florence Nightingale and its relevance today, and [defend] her reputation and legacy when necessary." McDonald argues that Seacole has been promoted at the expense of Florence Nightingale, and has written on the ways that "...support for Seacole has been used to attack Nightingale's reputation as a pioneer in public health and nursing."

There was opposition to the siting of a statue of Mary Seacole at St Thomas' Hospital on the grounds that she had no connection with this institution, whereas Florence Nightingale did. Sean Lang has stated that she "does not qualify as a mainstream figure in the history of nursing", while a letter to The Times from the Florence Nightingale Society and signed by members including historians and biographers asserted that "Seacole's battlefield excursions ... took place post-battle, after selling wine and sandwiches to spectators. Mrs Seacole was a kind and generous businesswoman, but was not a frequenter of the battlefield 'under fire' or a pioneer of nursing."

A 2013 article by Lynn McDonald in The Times Literary Supplement asked "How did Mary Seacole come to be viewed as a pioneer of modern nursing?", comparing her unfavourably with Kofoworola Pratt who was the first Black nurse in the NHS, and concluded "She deserves much credit for rising to the occasion, but her tea and lemonade did not save lives, pioneer nursing or advance health care".

Jennings has suggested that Seacole's race has played a part in the resistance by some of Nightingale's supporters. The American academic Gretchen Gerzina has also agreed with this theory, claiming that many of the supposed criticisms leveled at Seacole are due to her race. One criticism of Seacole made by supporters of Nightingale is that she was not trained at an accredited medical institution. However, Jamaican women such as 18th-century practitioners Nanny of the Maroons and Mrs Grant (Seacole's mother), developed their nursing skills from West African healing traditions, such as the use of herbs, which became known as obeah in Jamaica. According to the writer Helen Rappaport, in the late eighteenth and early nineteenth centuries, the West African and Jamaican creole "doctress", such as Cubah Cornwallis and Sarah Adams, who both died in the late 1840s, often had greater success than the European-trained doctors who practised what was then traditional medicine. These doctresses of Jamaica practised hygiene decades before Nightingale adopted it as one of her key reforms in her book Notes on Nursing in 1859.

Seacole's name appears in an appendix to the Key Stage 2 National Curriculum, as an example of a significant Victorian historical figure. There is no requirement that teachers include Seacole in their lessons. At the end of 2012 it was reported that Mary Seacole was to be removed from the National Curriculum. Opposing this, Greg Jenner, historical consultant to Horrible Histories, has stated that while he thought her medical achievements may have been exaggerated, removing Seacole from the curriculum would be a mistake. Susan Sheridan has argued that the leaked proposal to remove Seacole from the National Curriculum is part of "a concentration solely on large-scale political and military history and a fundamental shift away from social history."

Many commentators do not accept the view that Seacole's accomplishments were exaggerated. British social commentator Patrick Vernon has opined that many of the claims that Seacole's achievements were exaggerated have come from an establishment that is determined to suppress and hide the Black contribution to British history. Helen Seaton claims that Nightingale fitted the Victorian ideal of a heroine more than Seacole, and that Seacole managing to overcome racial prejudice makes her "a fitting role model for both blacks and non-blacks". In The Daily Telegraph, Cathy Newman argues that Michael Gove's plans for the new history curriculum "could mean the only women children learn anything about will be queens".

In January 2013, Operation Black Vote launched a petition to request Education Secretary Michael Gove to drop neither Seacole nor Olaudah Equiano from the National Curriculum. Rev. Jesse Jackson and others wrote a letter to The Times protesting against the mooted removal of Mary Seacole from the National Curriculum. This was declared successful on 8 February 2013 when the DfE opted to leave Seacole on the curriculum.

== In popular culture ==
Seacole was portrayed by the actress Sara Powell in a 2021 episode of the BBC science fiction drama Doctor Who titled "War of the Sontarans", alongside Jodie Whittaker as the 13th Doctor.

Seacole is the subject of biodrama "Marys Seacole" (2019) by Jackie Sibblies Drury, which explores her life and imagines her in contemporary settings.

In 2020, Greg Jenner published the book Dead Famous: An Unexpected History of Celebrity from Bronze Age to Silver Screen, which is about how instrumental modernity's earlier technologies were in propelling celebrity culture, such as daily newspapers, and how the celebrity phenomenon has changed and stayed the same. The book briefly talks about Seacole and draws comparisons with Florence Nightingale.

== See also ==
- Black British elite, the class Seacole belonged to.

== Notes ==
During the eighteenth and nineteenth centuries, the term "creole" applied to anyone born in the so-called New World, regardless of racial or ethnic background. Sometimes a qualifier was used, such as Black creole or white creole. See, for example, David Lambert's White Creole Culture, Politics and Identity During the Age of Abolition (Cambridge UP, 2005) and Edward Kamau Brathwaite's The Development of Creole Society, 1770-1820 (Oxford 1971).

== Bibliography ==
- Alexander, Ziggi; Dewjee, Audrey (1984). Wonderful Adventures of Mrs Seacole in Many Lands. Falling Wall Press. ISBN 0-905046-23-4.
- Ramdin, Ron (2005). Mary Seacole. Haus Publishing. ISBN 1-904950-03-5.
- Robinson, Jane (2004). Mary Seacole: The Charismatic Black Nurse who became a heroine of the Crimea. Constable. ISBN 1-84119-677-0.
- Gardner, Jule (2000). Who's Who in British History. Collins & Brown. p. 864. ISBN 1-85585-771-5.
