= New Testament Church of God =

New Testament Church of God may refer to:

- New Testament Church of God, Jamaica, branches of the Church of God (Cleveland, Tennessee) in most Caribbean countries bear the prefix "New Testament".
- New Testament Christian Churches of America, founded as the New Testament Church of God
- New Testament Church of God the Rock in Birmingham, England
- New Testament Church of God Cathedral of Praise in north London, England
- The congregation of the former Presbyterian Church, Aldershot, England
