= Oliver Lyseight =

Pentecostal bishop

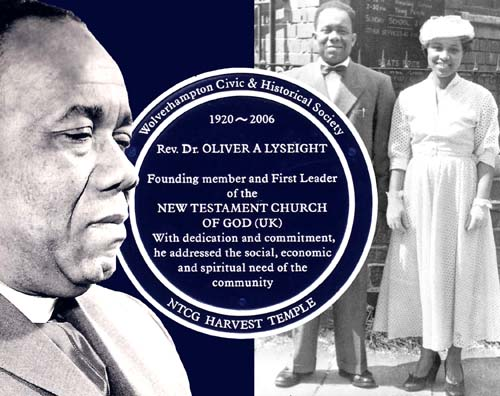
- Born: December 11, 1919; Claremont, Jamaica
- Died: February 20, 2006 (aged 86); Wolverhampton, England
- Known for: Founding Father of the New Testament Church of God England & Wales

Oliver Augustus Lyseight (1919–2006) was a Bishop and the co-founder, alongside Bishop Herman Brown, of the New Testament Church of God, one of Britain's largest black-majority churches.

Lyseight was born in Claremont, Jamaica on 11 December 1919. He migrated to England from Jamaica in 1951.

As of 2024, the church, which is denominationally Pentecostal, claims over 130 distinct branches and 11,000 members. Lyseight was a spiritual leader to the "Windrush generation", the first Caribbeans to emigrate in significant numbers to Britain, notably in 1948 aboard the HMT Empire Windrush.

Lyseight died on 28 February 2006 in West Park Hospital in Wolverhampton. at the age of 86.
