= Patrick Vernon =

British social commentator and political activist (born 1961)

Sir Patrick Vernon OBE
- Born: Patrick Philip Vernon; 1961 (age 64–65); Wolverhampton, England
- Education: Manchester Metropolitan University; Warwick University
- Occupations: Social commentator and political activist
- Known for: Successful campaign for Windrush Day
- Awards: Honorary degree of Doctor of Letters, University of Wolverhampton
- Website: patrickvernon.org.uk

Sir Patrick Philip Vernon OBE (born 1961) is a British social commentator and political activist of Jamaican heritage, who works in the voluntary sector and public sector. He is a former Labour councillor in the London Borough of Hackney. His career has been involved with developing and managing health and social care services, including mental health, public health, regeneration and employment projects. Also a film maker and amateur cultural historian, he runs his own social enterprise promoting the history of diverse communities, as founder of Every Generation and the "100 Great Black Britons" campaign. He is also an expert on African and Caribbean genealogy in the UK. He was appointed a Clore Fellow in 2007, an Officer of the Order of the British Empire (OBE) in the 2012 Birthday Honours for "services to the Reduction of Health Inequalities for Ethnic Minorities", and in 2018 was awarded an honorary doctorate from the University of Wolverhampton.

Vernon led a successful campaign for 22 June to be recognised annually as Windrush Day, a national day acknowledging the migrant contribution to UK society, which was officially backed by the British government in 2018.

In 2019, he was appointed associate director of Communities at the Centre for Ageing Better, a National Lottery Community funded charity looking to improve the lives of those approaching later life.

Vernon was knighted in the 2026 Birthday Honours, for services to racial equality.

== Biography ==
=== Education and early years ===
Patrick Vernon was born in Wolverhampton, Staffordshire (now in the West Midlands), England, to Norris and Avis Vernon, who had migrated to the UK from Jamaica in the 1950s. Vernon traced his lineage as far back as the 1800s, to a village in Senegal called Kédougou.

He grew up in the All Saints and Penn Fields areas of Wolverhampton, attending Grove Junior School, Colton Hills, and Wulfrun College, before going on to study law at Manchester Metropolitan University.

He later undertook postgraduate studies at Warwick University. He moved to London in 1989.

=== Health and social care work ===
Vernon initially worked in health and social care, where he was a manager for Citizens Advice Bureau and a civil servant at the Department of Health and Local Government Association. He later served as director of the Brent Health Action Zone (Brent Primary Care Trust), and Regional Director for charity MIND. He later worked in the third sector for a number of organisations focussing on the mental health of refugees, immigrants and prisoners.

He was associate member for the Department of History of Medicine at Warwick University, an advisory board member for the mental health campaign Time To Change, and a former ministerial adviser for mental health. He was a member of the independent Metropolitan Police inquiry on Mental Health and Policing.

=== Every Generation Media and family history work ===
In 2002, Vernon founded Every Generation Media to develop education programmes, publications and films on cultural heritage and family history, with the Every Generation website becoming one of the main sites on family history for African and Caribbean communities in Britain. In 2003, he launched the successful "100 Great Black Britons" campaign, in response to a television series broadcast by the BBC called 100 Greatest Britons (a list topped by Winston Churchill through public nomination), in order "to raise the profile of the Black contribution to Britain and to challenge the notion of Britishness."

The campaign received wide coverage in the national print and television media, with Mary Seacole eventually announced as having been voted the greatest Black Briton. In 2019, the decision was taken to relaunch and update the poll, and the results of the updated poll were revealed in a new book entitled 100 Great Black Britons, written by Vernon with Angelina Osborne, that was published on 24 September 2020.

=== Windrush Day and community activism ===
Vernon was among the first to call for the national celebration of "Windrush Day" on 22 June, to recognise the migrant contribution to UK society, marking the day in 1948 when the Empire Windrush docked at Tilbury, bringing the first big group of post-war migrants from the West Indies to Britain. He was appointed an OBE in 2012, in recognition of his work to promote health equality for Black and minority ethnic communities.

In 2017, Vernon was elected to Fellowship of the Royal Historical Society (RHS) and he is a member of the RHS's Race, Ethnicity and Equality Working Group, which in 2018 published Race, Ethnicity & Equality in UK History: A Report and Resource for Change.

In May 2018, following his earlier campaign for Windrush Day and his 2013 petition to the British government, Vernon relaunched a petition asking the Prime Minister to recognise 22 June as a national day to commemorate and celebrate migration and migrant communities in Britain. It was later announced by the government that an annual Windrush Day would be celebrated, supported by a grant of up to £500,000, to recognise and honour the contribution of the Windrush Generation and their descendants and to "keep their legacy alive for future generations, ensuring that we all celebrate the diversity of Britain's history."

In April 2020, after his sister's partner died from the COVID-19 virus, Vernon set up a fundraising initiative called "The Majonzi Fund" which will provide families from Black & Minority ethnicities with access to small financial grants that can be used to access bereavement counselling and organise memorial events and tributes after the social lockdown has been lifted.

Vernon featured on the August 2020 cover of British Vogue as one of 20 activists "ready to change the world".

Vernon played a pivotal role in obtaining a Blue Plaque in memory of British immigrant rights activist Paulette Wilson, a member of the Windrush Generation. The plaque was launched with campaigners including Claire Darke MBE at the Wolverhampton Heritage Centre. The centre is a cornerstone of the area's local Caribbean community and was formerly the constituency office of Enoch Powell where the infamous Rivers of Blood speech was written.

In the 2026 Birthday Honours, Vernon was knighted for services to racial equality.

=== Political career ===
Vernon served for eight years as a Labour councillor for the Queensbridge ward in the London Borough of Hackney, stepping down in May 2014, when the ward was abolished. He was appointed as chair of the Labour Party's Race Equality Advisory Group in December 2015.

=== Controversy ===
In 2015, Vernon was caught up in controversy after he asserted that the design of the flag of the Black Country, which features a chain motif, was offensive and insensitive. Vernon has claimed that this led to him being "dragged into an online hate campaign after saying that the flag's chain motif represents an image of an industry which profited from the transatlantic slave trade."

=== Cultural contributions ===
As a film-maker, Vernon's work includes directing and producing A Charmed Life, a documentary about the Caribbean contribution in the UK during World War II, focusing on Jamaican ex-serviceman Eddie Martin Noble.

Among the outlets for which Vernon writes are The Guardian, The Voice, and Media Diversified. In 2017, the 30th anniversary of Black History Month in Britain, he was appointed as guest editor for Black History Month Magazine.

As MC Patrick Vernon, he presents Museum of Grooves, a podcast that explores Afrofuturism.

== Publications ==
=== Books ===
- Coauthor with Angelina Osborne, 100 Great Black Britons, Robinson Press. 2020; ISBN 9 781 472 144300.
- Coauthor with Yansie Rolston, Black Grief and Healing: Why We Need to Talk About Health, Inequality, Trauma and Loss, Jessica Kingsley Publishers, September 2024, ISBN 9781839973277.

=== Selected articles ===
- "Charmed life", The Guardian, 4 November 2009.
- "Windrush Day: a fitting way to celebrate our immigrant population", The Guardian, 25 January 2010.
- "Put race equality in mental health back on the agenda", The Guardian, 1 March 2011.
- "'How I Tried To Trace My Roots Back To Africa'", The Gleaner (Jamaica), 18 May 2011.
- "Why we must tackle racial inequality in mental health services", The Guardian, 18 January 2012.
- "Obama Puts Black Britain In The 'Yes We Can' Mood", The Voice, 28 January 2013.
- "Remembrance Sunday: Don't Forget Our West Indian Heroes", The Voice, 10 November 2013.
- "How Nelson Mandela Inspired Black Britain"], The Voice, 9 December 2013.
- "What 12 Years a Slave tells us about 21st century black mental health", The Guardian, 5 February 2014.
- "As Caribbean nations call for compensation, it's time for Britain to examine its own history in the slave trade", The Independent, 12 March 2014.
- "The Price Tag on Slavery is Beyond Pounds and Dollars", Media Diversified, 28 March 2014.
- "Where are all the Black historians?", Media Diversified, 30 March 2016.
- "Rubbishing Mary Seacole is another move to hide the contributions of black people", The Guardian, 21 June 2016.
- "We hoped to see more black lives on our screens. Our hopes were dashed", The Guardian, 18 November 2016.
- "The Windrush shaped Britain. Why not recognise that?", The Guardian, 9 May 2018.
- "Scandals Like Windrush Show Why Black History Month Must Be Celebrated", HuffPost (UK), 5 October 2018.
- "Why Boris Johnson needs to reject The Sewell Report and launch an action plan to implement previous race reports", The Voice, 12 April 2021.

== Selected awards and recognition ==
- 2003: CRE Race in the Media Awards for New Media
- 2003: Buckingham Palace recognition as "Pioneer of the Nation" for Cultural History
- 2004: Windrush Awards winners for Internet and Technology and Community Champion
- 2005: National Ethnic Minority Social Enterprise Award
- 2006: CRE Race in the Media Awards runner-up in New Media
- 2007: Clore Leadership Fellow
- 2009: a community space in the Chalkhill Health and Community Centre, near Wembley Stadium, was named "Vernon Hall" in 2010, in recognition of his work locally as a former senior NHS manager in Brent.
- 2012: awarded OBE in Queen's Birthday Honours for services to the reduction of health inequalities in ethnic minorities
- 2013: Visiting Fellow, Centre for History of Medicine, Warwick University
- 2014: Health Service Journal, BME Pioneer for 2014
- 2014: Jamaica Times UK, Political Representative of the Year
- 2017: Elected to Fellowship of the Royal Historical Society
- 2018: Honorary degree of Doctor of Letters, University of Wolverhampton
- 2026: Knighted for services to racial equality

== Other ==
- "Letter to My Brother" in Encounters with James Baldwin: Celebrating 100 Years. London: Supernova Books. 2024.
