= John Edmonstone =

Freed slave and taxidermist, born in British Guiana, residing in Edinburgh from 1817

John Edmonstone was a taxidermist and teacher of taxidermy in Edinburgh, Scotland. He was an influential Black Briton.

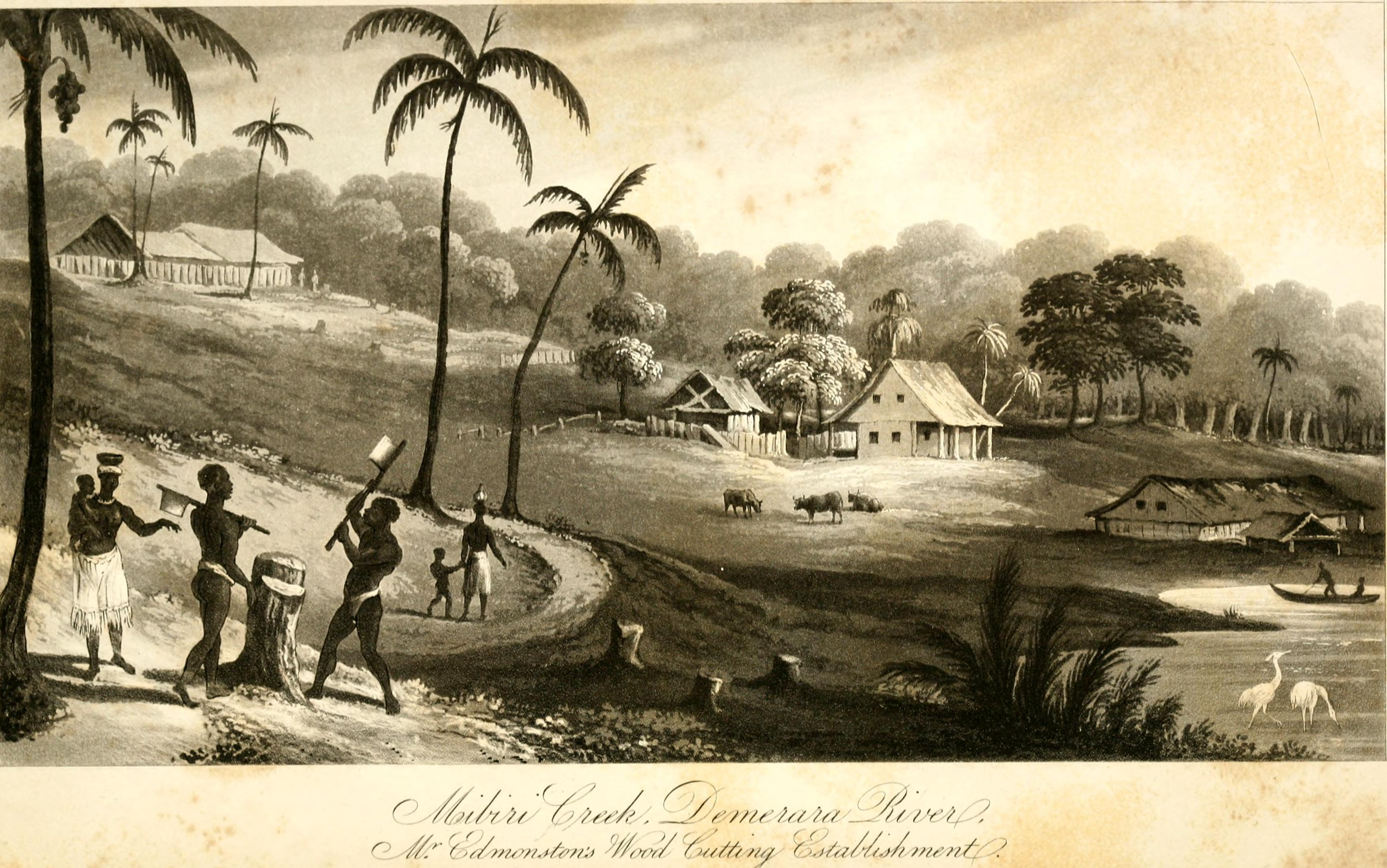
Charles Edmonstone's plantation, Mibiri Creek, Demerara River in Guyana.

== Early life ==
Born into slavery on a wood plantation in Mibiri Creek, Demerara, British Guiana (present-day Guyana, South America), he was given the surname of his slave-owner, Charles Edmonstone, who owned the plantation and also owned the Cardross Park estate at Cardross, near Dumbarton in Scotland.

Around 1812 the plantation was visited by the naturalist Charles Waterton, who spent considerable time teaching John Edmonstone taxidermy.

== Career ==
In 1817, Edmonstone went to Scotland with Charles Edmonstone, possibly to become a servant to the Edmonstone family at Cardross Park.

Being free, John Edmonstone took employment in Glasgow, where he sold exotic animal specimens to the museum. He then moved to Edinburgh, where in 1823 he set up shop as a "bird-stuffer" at 37 Lothian Street. He sold specimens including birds and snakes. From this shop, he taught taxidermy to students attending the nearby University of Edinburgh.

Charles Darwin studied for two months with Edmonstone in 1826, when Darwin was aged around 17. Edmonstone gave Darwin inspiring accounts of tropical rain forests in South America and may have encouraged him to explore there. Having worked in hot climates, Edmonstone had learned to preserve birds rapidly before decomposition set in, a skill that may have benefited Darwin during the voyage of HMS Beagle from 1831, when Darwin preserved Galapagos finches and Galapagos mockingbirds.

Darwin described Edmonstone as:

A negro lived in Edinburgh, who had travelled with Waterton, and gained his livelihood by stuffing birds, which he did excellently: he gave me lessons for payment, and I used often to sit with him, for he was a very pleasant and intelligent man.

Edmonstone also undertook work for the Royal Museum of the University. He moved his taxidermy shop to Edinburgh's main shopping thoroughfare, opening at 29 and then later 66 Princes Street. In the 1840s, he moved shop again to 10 South St David's Street.

== Personal life ==
Edmonstone appears to have married his neighbour, Mary Kerr, in 1824. The 1841 census records Edmonstone living at James Court, Edinburgh, with Mary and three children.

== Legacy ==
In 2009, a plaque to commemorate Edmonstone was commissioned by the London arts venue Kings Place, to be made by the Wedgwood porcelain firm. The plaque was put up at Negociants Bar, in Lothian Street, Edinburgh, although it has since been lost.

Edmonstone is regarded as one of the "100 Great Black Britons".

A poem narrated from the perspective of John Edmonstone appears in the Winter 2019 issue of African American Review.
