= Windrush Day =

UK commemoration, 22 June

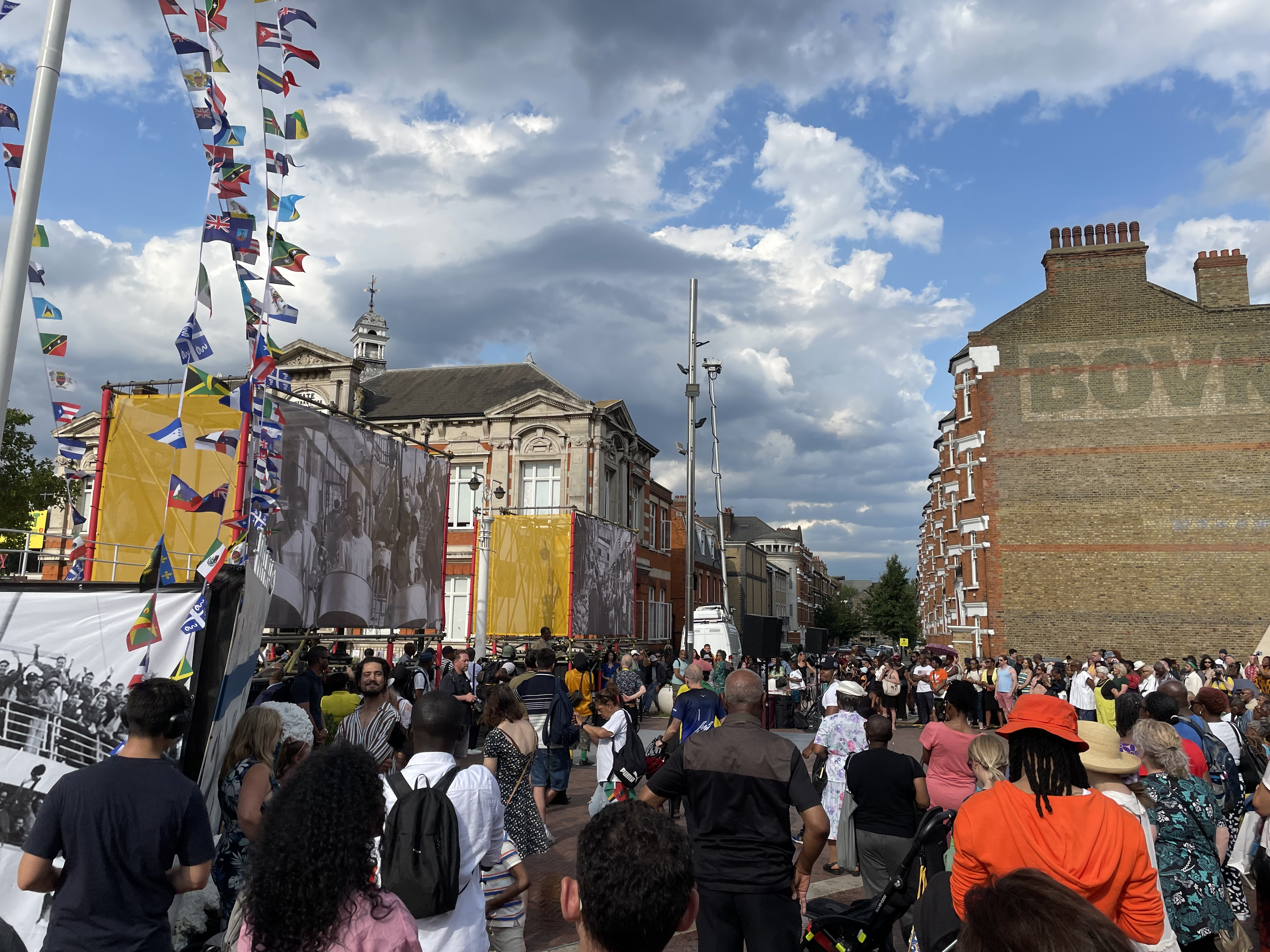
- Windrush Square in Brixton, London, 22 June 2023
- Observed by: United Kingdom
- Type: Secular
- Significance: History and contribution of African-Caribbean migrants in the UK
- Date: 22 June
- Next time: 22 June 2027
- Frequency: Annual
- First time: 2018
- Related to: Empire Windrush

Windrush Day is a commemoration in the United Kingdom held on 22 June to honour the contributions of migrants to the post-war economy. It celebrates African-Caribbeans who began arriving on the HMT Empire Windrush in 1948, later known as the "Windrush generation". Windrush Day is not a bank holiday and has grown in popularity since a campaign by Patrick Vernon led to its introduction in 2018.

== History ==
On 22 June 1948, 492 Caribbean people arrived at Tilbury Docks, Essex, in the UK, on the Empire Windrush ship. News reports at the time reported that the number of people was 492, but the ship's records show that the ship was carrying 1,027 passengers. According to the passenger lists, 802 of those on board the ship gave their last country of residence as somewhere in the Caribbean. In the aftermath of World War II, the UK had a labour shortage and African-Caribbean migrants independently travelled to the United Kingdom to find work. These jobs included the production of steel, coal, iron, and food, and also jobs in the service sector, such as public transport and staffing the new National Health Service.

There is no record of the post-war Labour government (in power at the time of the arrival of the Empire Windrush) encouraging African-Caribbean migrants to settle in the United Kingdom. However, as citizens of the British Commonwealth, Caribbean people were considered British subjects, with the right to live and work in the UK, and were eligible to respond to advertised opportunities for citizens of Commonwealth countries. Later, there were direct recruitment drives in the Caribbean from some British Organisations, such as the one started in February 1956 by London transport, at the invitation of the government of Barbados, to fill shortages in entry-level roles.

Many early immigrants were denied access to private employment and accommodation because of the colour of their skin. Black people were also banned from many pubs, clubs, and even churches.

== Campaign ==
Patrick Vernon was the first to call for the commemoration of "Windrush Day", to recognise the migrant contribution to UK society, on the day when the first big group of post-war migrants from the Caribbean arrived in Britain. Vernon first launched a petition to this effect in 2013, which was followed by a further campaign in 2018, at the height of the Windrush scandal. Official backing was given when it was subsequently announced by the government that an annual Windrush Day would be celebrated on 22 June, supported by a grant of up to £500,000, to recognise and honour the contribution of the Windrush Generation and their descendants and to "keep their legacy alive for future generations, ensuring that we all celebrate the diversity of Britain's history."

== Observance ==
The purpose of Windrush Day is to encourage "communities across the country to celebrate the contribution of the Windrush Generation and their descendants", according to the United Kingdom government. "A Windrush Day will allow communities up and down the country to recognise and honour the enormous contribution of those who stepped ashore at Tilbury Docks 70 years ago", said communities minister Nick Bourne. Government funding helps a variety of events and activities to take place, such as the day dance performances, exhibitions, and debate.

On Windrush Day 2021, a plaque was erected in memory of British immigrant rights activist Paulette Wilson, a member of the "Windrush generation" (which term usually refers to those who were born in the Caribbean and settled in the UK between 1948 and 1971). The plaque was launched with campaigners including Patrick Vernon and Claire Darke MBE as well as her family at the Wolverhampton Heritage Centre. The centre is a cornerstone of the area's local Caribbean community and was formerly the constituency office of Enoch Powell, where the infamous "Rivers of Blood" speech was written.

On Windrush Day 2022, the National Windrush Monument was unveiled at Waterloo Station, London.

In 2025, Windrush Day was on Sunday, 22 June, with events taking place across the country.
