= New Testament Church of God Cathedral of Praise =

Church in London, England

Coordinates: 51.6064°N 0.1108°W

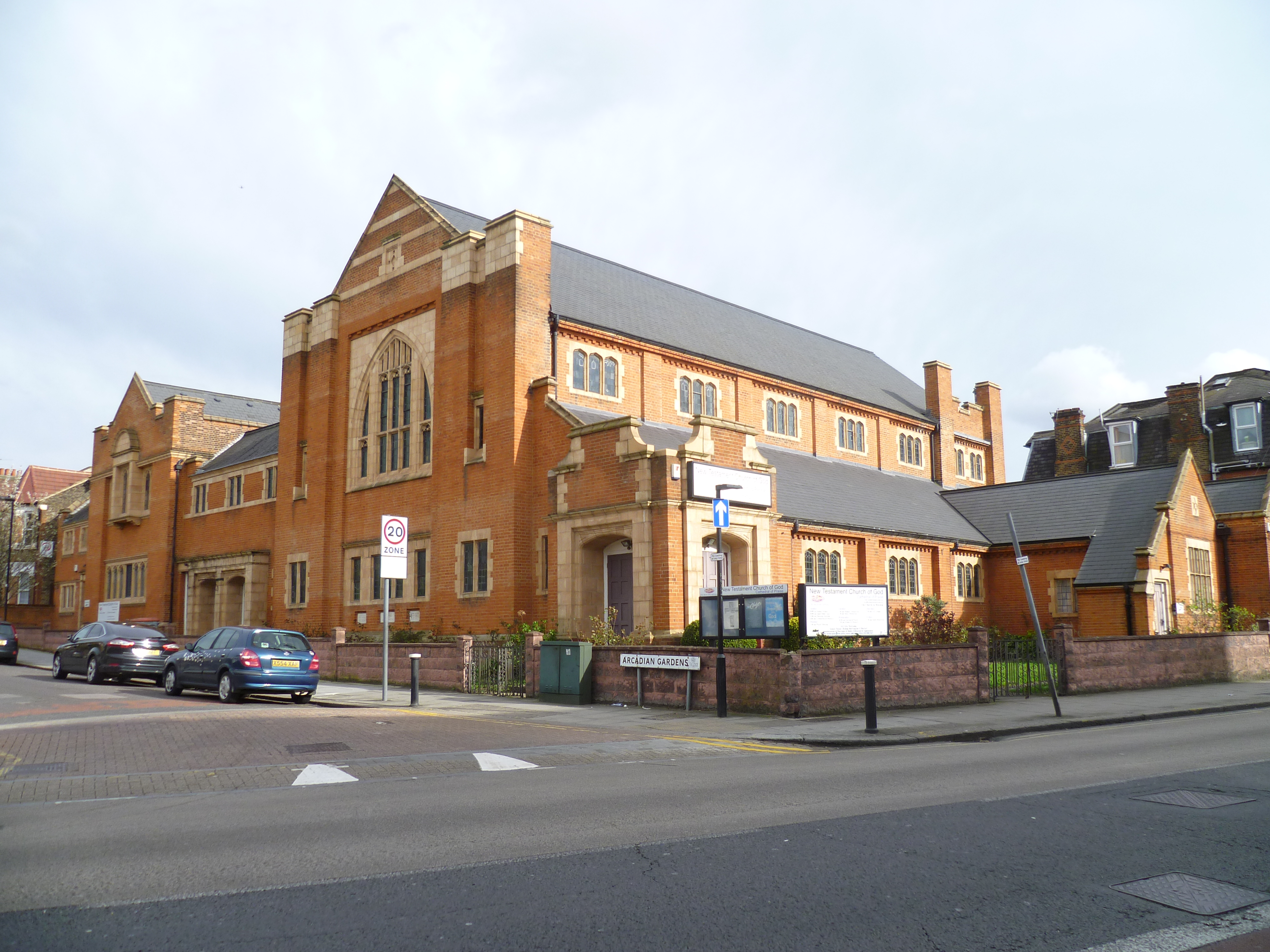
New Testament Church of God Cathedral of Praise

The New Testament Church of God Cathedral of Praise is a church in Arcadian Gardens, Wood Green, north London.

The church was bought for £75,000 in 1977 by the New Testament Church of God, founded by reverend Carter. It was originally the Congregational, United Reformed Church of St. James at Bowes, built between 1901 and 1909. It is a grade II listed building with Historic England.
