= Elaine Arnold (SRF) =

Elaine Arnold PhD OBE (born 1931) is a British author and lecturer in the field of attachment and separation.

== Life ==
She was born in Barbados, and went to the government teacher training and became a teacher in Trinidad and Tobago. On Trinidad she worked in the Social Welfare Department, and did some television work on child care. She moved to the United Kingdom at the end of the 1950s, pursuing graduate study.

As related by Gill Gorell Barnes, Arnold, then known as Elaine Robertson, was a qualified psychiatric social worker whom she encountered in 1973 at Sussex University, then a first year social work student. She changed from a social work master's degree course to a research-based MPhil on separated Caribbean mothers and children. Barnes found the research area topical in terms of child guidance clinic practice in London. She was recorded in 1973 in the Trinidad and Tobago Gazette, a recipient of the Hummingbird Medal, as a Voluntary Social Worker, Mrs. Eucille Elaine Robertson.

At the time of her 1979 marriage to Anthony Bernard E. B. Prendergast-Arnold (1917–1992), Arnold was known as Eucille Elaine Robertson; from then she used the surnames Prendergast-Arnold or Arnold.

Elaine Arnold was awarded the OBE in the 2023 Birthday Honours.

== Works ==
Arnold applied John Bowlby's appproach to attachment theory to cases of children of Caribbean parents who had migrated to the United Kingdom. She drew attention to parents' misidentifications of children's signs associated with separation anxiety. In the Acknowledgements section of her doctoral dissertation, she mentioned the role of Jafar Kareem (1930–1992) of Nafsiyat, London, in suggesting its topic to her.

Arnold has published two books:

- Out of Sight - Not Out of Mind: A Study of West Indian Mothers Living in England, Separated for Long Periods from Their Children Through Leaving Them Behind when Migrating, and Subsequently Reunited (1975)
- Working with Families of African Caribbean Origin: Understanding Issues around Immigration and Attachment (2012)

Social Welfare in Trinidad & Tobago (1971) was a report written with Anthony J. Lloyd. With Bernadette Hawkes, Arnold edited the SRF conference volume Internalising the Historical Past: Issues for Separation and Moving On (2009).

== Supporting Relationships and Families ==
Arnold is a director of Supporting Relationships and Families (SRF), formerly the Separation and Reunion Forum, of which she was a founder in 1999. Its stated purpose is "to raise awareness and to promote a discourse on the importance of secure attachment in children." Arnold in 2012 explained that her role as a founder of SRF was "as a result of my research" on separation and reunion experiences.
