= David Case (RAF officer) =

- Born: c. 1953 (age 72–73); Guyana
- Military career
- Allegiance: United Kingdom
- Branch: Royal Air Force
- Service years: 1972–present
- Rank: Air Commodore

Air Commodore David Case (born c. 1953) is the highest ranking black officer in the Royal Air Force of the United Kingdom, and as of 2000, at the age of 47, he became the highest ranking black officer ever to serve in Britain's armed forces.

== Biography ==
Case was born in Guyana and immigrated to Britain at the age of five. He was educated at Beckenham and Penge Grammar School and learnt to fly on a Flying Scholarship while still at school. He joined the RAF as a 19-year-old cadet to read aeronautical engineering at the Queen's University Belfast. He received his commission in 1975 and was awarded the distinguished Sword of Honour, which is bestowed upon the top cadet officer of the year.
