= Notes on Nursing =

Florence Nightingale book

Notes on Nursing: What it is and What it is Not is a book first published by Florence Nightingale in 1859. A 76-page volume with 3 page appendix published by Harrison of Pall Mall, it was intended to give hints on nursing to those entrusted with the health of others. Florence Nightingale stressed that it was not meant to be a comprehensive guide from which to teach one's self to be a nurse but to help in the practice of treating others.

In the preface of the original edition, she highlights that Notes on Nursing is not a rulebook; rather the notes 'are meant simply to give hints for thought to women who have personal charge of the health of others.'

== Description of the book ==
In her introduction to the 1974 edition, Joan Quixley, then head of the Nightingale School of Nursing, wrote that despite the passage of time since Notes on Nursing was published, Nightingale's work was still incredibly relevant. Whether it be in regards to home care, hospital care, or community care, Quixley argues that her techniques are still applicable to modern settings. "With its mid-nineteenth century background of poverty, neglect, ignorance and prejudice the book was a challenge to contemporary views of nursing, of nurses and of the patient". "The book was the first of its kind ever to be written. It appeared at a time when the simple rules of health were only beginning to be known, when its topics were of vital importance not only for the well-being and recovery of patients, when hospitals were riddled with infection, when nurses were still mainly regarded as ignorant, uneducated persons. The book has, inevitably, its place in the history of nursing, for it was written by the founder of modern nursing".

The book included advice and practices for the following areas:

- ventilation and warming
- health in houses
- petty management (how things are done by others when you must be away)
- noise
- variety (environment)
- taking food and what kinds of food
- bed and bedding
- light
- cleanliness of rooms
- personal cleanliness
- chattering hopes and advices (the false assurances and recommendations of family and friends to the sick)
- observation of the sick

Much of her advice and practices are considered to be very timely, and are applicable to this day. She had a very holistic approach- making the claim that the symptoms of disease were not due to the disease itself, rather symptoms were caused by wants (ex. the desire for quietness, or for cleanliness).

== Impact ==
The publication of nursing ideals led to many advancements in the nursing field, nursing began to be recognized more professionally, thus training became more standardized. Much of this training was inspired by Nightingale.

In 1873, 14 years after the publication of Notes on Nursing, nurse training became formalized in the United States. Three separate programs arose (New York Training School, Connecticut Training School, and Boston Training School), and all programs were based on ideals from Nightingale, and are regarded as "Nightingale schools". 27 years later, in 1900, there were between 400 and 800 nursing schools nationally.

Many of Nightingale's principles continue to inform modern nursing education and practice, signifying the timeless relevance of her work. In the nursing field, she is still widely revered as an inspirational figure. This book remains incredibly relevant today, with multiple editions.

Later editions of Notes on Nursing are available to the public today.
