= List of Jamaican British people =

This is a list of notable Jamaican British people.

== Academia ==
- Kehinde Andrews (born 1983), professor of Black studies at Birmingham City University. He is the first black studies professor in the UK and led the establishment of the first black studies programme in Europe, at Birmingham City. Activist and author. Director of the Centre for Critical Social Research; founder of the Harambee Organisation of Black Unity; and co-chair of the Black Studies Association
- Robert Beckford (born 1965), professor of Black theology at the Queen's Foundation, Birmingham
- Aggrey Burke (1943–2025), president of the Transcultural Psychiatry Society. vice-chair and a trustee of the George Padmore Institute. Britain's first black consultant psychiatrist, appointed by the National Health Service (NHS)
- Nira Chamberlain (born 1969), president of the Institute of Mathematics and its Applications. He is the first black mathematician to feature in the biographical reference book Who’s Who
- Patricia Daley, vice principal of Jesus College, Cambridge and professor of human geography of Africa at the University of Oxford and a Fellow of Jesus College, Oxford
- Len Garrison (1943–2003), educationalist, historian and community activist. He set up ACER (Afro-Caribbean Education Resource) and co-founded the Black Cultural Archives
- Alan Powell Goffe (1920–1966), head of the Department of Experimental Cytology at the Wellcome Research Laboratories, Developed the Polio vaccine and has a strain of the Measels named after him.
- Kei Miller (born 1978), professor of creative writing at the University of Exeter. Poet, fiction writer, essayist and blogger
- Donald Palmer (born 1962), senior lecturer in immunology in the Comparative Biomedical Sciences Department of the Royal Veterinary College, London
- Geoff Palmer (born 1940), Chancellor of Heriot-Watt University. Palmer became Scotland's first black university professor in 1989
- Winsome Pinnock (born 1961), visiting lecturer at Royal Holloway College and senior visiting fellow at the University of Cambridge. Playwright
- Leone Ross (born 1969), senior lecturer in the Creative Writing department at Roehampton University. Senior Fellow of the UK Higher Education Academy. Novelist, short story writer, editor and journalist
- Tony Sewell (born 1959), educational consultant and chair of the Commission on Race and Ethnic Disparities
- Shirley Thompson, professor of music at the University of Westminster

== Activism and politics ==
- Diane Abbott (born 1953), Labour MP since 1987. Abbott is Britain’s first black female Member of Parliament, the first black female Shadow Home Secretary and the longest-serving black MP in the House of Commons
- Shaun Bailey (born 1971), politician and former journalist
- Frances Batty Shand (c.1815–1885), early charitable activist
- Dawn Butler (born 1963), Labour MP since 2015. Butler became the first black woman to speak from the despatch box in the House of Commons in December 2009
- Betty Campbell (1934–2017), Welsh community activist and Wales' first black head teacher
- Janet Daby (born 1970), politician
- Barbara Follett (born 1942), politician
- Henry Gunter (1920–2007), civil rights campaigner, trade unionist and the first black delegate to be elected to the Birmingham Trades Council
- Roy Hackett (died 2022), civil rights campaigner
- Stuart Hall (1932–2014), cultural theorist and political activist. Co-founder of New Left Review He was voted one of the 100 greatest black Britons
- Paulette Hamilton, member of the Labour Party and Birmingham's first black MP
- Darren Henry (born 1968), politician
- Lee Jasper (born 1958), politician and activist; was Senior Policy Advisor on Equalities to the Mayor of London
- Sam Beaver King (1926–2016), campaigner and Southwark's first black Mayor
- David Kurten, (born 1971), politician
- Baroness Lawrence (born 1952), campaigner
- Harold Moody (1882–1947), physician and campaigner who established the League of Coloured Peoples in 1931
- Olive Morris (1952–1979), community leader and activist in the feminist, Black nationalist, and squatters' rights campaigns
- Bill Norris (born 1938), General Secretary of the Transport and General Workers' Union from 1992 to 2003, the first black leader of a major British trade union He was voted one of the 100 greatest black Britons
- Marvin Rees (born 1972), politician who was the Mayor of Bristol. He is the UK’s first directly elected black mayor
- Patrick Roach (born 1965), NASUWT General Secretary
- Louis Stedman-Bryce (born 1974), property investor and former politician
- Patrick Philip Vernon (born 1961), Labour councillor, chair of the Labour Party's Race Equality Advisory Group and political activist
- James (Jim) Alexander Williams, first (ceremonial) black Lord Mayor of Bristol

== Business and law ==
- Jak Beula (born 1963), entrepreneur, cultural activist; founder and chief executive of the Nubian Jak Community Trust
- Selena Caemawr (born c. 1982), entrepreneur, autism activist and poet
- Dyke, Dryden and Wade; Britain's first black multi-million-pound business enterprise
- Wilfred Emmanuel-Jones (born 1957), businessman, farmer, and founder of "The Black Farmer" range of food products
- Michael Fuller (born 1959), Chief Inspector of the Crown Prosecution Service and Britain's first black Police Chief Constable
- Emma Grede (born 1982), co-founder and CEO of Good American, a founding partner of Skims, and co-founder of Safely
- Chris Hohn (born 1966), billionaire and hedge fund manager
- Eric Irons (1921–2007), Britain's first black magistrate
- Neil Kenlock (born 1950), media professional. Co-founder of Choice FM, the UK’s first and only licensed, independent black music radio station. Co-founder of the first black British glossy magazine, Root
- Val McCalla (1943–2002), accountant and media entrepreneur. He was the founder of The Voice, a British weekly newspaper aimed at the Britain's black community
- Pat McGrath (born 1965), founder of Pat McGrath Labs which has an estimated value of $1 billion
- Jacqueline McKenzie, human rights lawyer
- Alexander McLean (born 1985), lawyer and founder of Justice Defenders
- Heather Melville (born 1962), corporate and international banker
- Caroline Newman (born 1963), first black solicitor to be elected to the Council of the Law Society of England and Wales. Also an author, entrepreneur and diversity advocate
- Nathanial Peat, entrepreneur and international motivational speaker
- Heather Rabbatts (born 1955), solicitor, businesswoman and broadcaster. She was a Football Association director from 2011 to 2017 and was the first ethnic minority person to do so and the only woman on the board. Chief executive of Merton then Chief executive of the London Borough of Lambeth. She became the youngest council chief in the country.
- Levi Roots (born 1958), businessman, TV personality and founder of "Reggae Reggae sauce"
- Shaun Wallace (born 1960), barrister, lecturer, TV personality. He is one of the six "chasers" on the ITV quiz show The Chase. He won Mastermind in 2004
- Dame Sharon White (born 1967), businesswoman and Second Permanent Secretary at HM Treasury from 2013 to 2015. She became the first black person, and the second woman, to become a Permanent Secretary at the HM Treasury
- Jacky Wright, chief digital officer and a corporate vice president at Microsoft US

== Entertainment ==
- Josie d'Arby (born 1972), actress, TV presenter and painter; in 1999, she became the youngest British woman to host her own chat show
- Akala (born 1983), rapper
- Aml Ameen (born 1985), actor
- Samuel Anderson (born 1982), actor
- Ella Balinska (born 1996), actress (Jamaican mother, Polish father)
- Marcia Barrett (born 1948), singer
- Les Ballets Nègres, Europe's first black dance company, founded in 1946 by Jamaican dancers Berto Pasuka and Ritchie Riley
- Sheyla Bonnick, singer-songwriter, performer, co-producer, fashion designer, author, inventor
- Gabrielle Brooks (born 1990), actress
- Errol Brown (1943–2015), singer-songwriter, best known as the frontman of the soul and funk band Hot Chocolate
- Simona Brown (born 1994), actress
- Keisha Buchanan (born 1984), Sugababes founding member, singer
- Alexandra Burke (born 1988), singer-songwriter and actress
- Mahalia Burkmar (born 1998), singer-songwriter
- Celeste (born 1994), soul singer
- Chip (born 1990), rapper
- Lloyd Coxsone (born c. 1945), sound system operator and record producer
- Doña Croll (born 1953), actress
- Olivia Dean (born 1999), singer
- Michelle de Swarte, comedian, presenter, actress, former model
- Alesha Dixon (born 1978), rapper, singer-songwriter, dancer, TV personality, and author
- Stefflon Don (born 1991), rapper, singer
- Omari Douglas (born 1994), actor
- Skaiwater (born 2000), rapper
- Sharon Duncan-Brewster, actress
- Leonie Elliott (born 1988), actress
- Jade Ewen (born 1988), singer, actress and former member of the girl group Sugababes
- Rebecca Ferguson (born 1986), singer
- Giggs (born 1983), Grime MC
- Mo Gilligan (born 1988), comedian
- Sandra Godley (born 1964), singer-songwriter, philanthropist, OBE medal for charity work
- Andrew Gourlay (born 1982), conductor
- Stephen Graham (born 1973), actor
- Jackie Guy, dancer, choreographer and teacher
- Alison Hammond (born 1975), TV personality, actress
- Mona Hammond (1931–2022), actress
- Ainsley Harriott (born 1957), chef and TV presenter
- Naomie Harris (born 1976), actress
- Lenny Henry (born 1958), comedian
- Kirby Howell-Baptiste (born 1987), actress
- Marvin Humes (born 1985), singer, disc jockey, TV presenter and radio host
- Rochelle Humes (born 1989), singer and presenter
- Jamelia (born 1981), singer-songwriter and TV presenter
- Diane Louise Jordan (born 1960), actress, TV and radio presenter; first black presenter of the children's television programme Blue Peter
- Janet Kay (born 1958), singer-songwriter and actress
- Erin Kellyman (born 1998), actress
- Natalia Kills (born 1986), singer
- Malachi Kirby (born 1989), actor
- Beverley Knight (born 1973), recording artist and musical theatre actress
- Lianne La Havas (born 1989), singer-songwriter and record producer
- Cleo Laine (born 1927), singer and actress; Grammy Award winner and voted one of the 100 greatest black Britons
- Tamara Lawrance (born 1994), actress
- Rustie Lee (born 1949), TV personality, TV chef, actress, singer and former politician
- Adrian Lester (born 1968), actor
- Don Letts (born 1956), film director, DJ and musician
- Shaznay Lewis (born 1975), singer-songwriter and actress
- Delroy Lindo (born 1952), actor
- Judi Love (born 1980), comedian
- Lashana Lynch (born 1987), actress
- M1llionz (born 1997), rapper
- Mad Lion, British rapper/Reggae performer singer
- Madeleine Mantock (born 1990), actress
- Ella Mai, singer-songwriter; Grammy winner
- Julian Marley, influential singer-songwriter
- Jo Martin, actress
- Colin McFarlane (born 1961), actor
- Dominique Moore (born 1986), performer
- Liz Mitchell (born 1952), popular reggae singer
- Ms. Dynamite (born 1981), singer-songwriter and record producer
- Nao (born 1987), singer-songwriter and record producer
- Nemzzz (born 2004), rapper
- Aaron Pierre (born 1994), actor
- Courtney Pine (born 1964), jazz musician, voted one of the 100 greatest black Britons
- Leigh-Anne Pinnock (born 1991), singer
- Jessica Plummer (born 1992), actress
- Maxi Priest (born 1961), singer-songwriter
- Paulette Randall (born 1961), theatre director
- Slick Rick, British rapper, producer
- Colin Salmon (born 1961), actor, director and executive producer
- Jorja Smith (born 1997), singer
- Myles Smith (born 1998), singer-songwriter
- Karla-Simone Spence, actress
- Neville Staple (born 1955), singer
- Amarah-Jae St. Aubyn (born 1994), actress
- Steel Pulse, reggae band; Grammy Award winners
- Antonia Thomas (born 1986), actress
- Marsha Thomason (born 1976), actress
- Carroll Thompson, singer, best known as the “Queen of Lovers Rock”
- Ruby Turner (born 1958), singer-songwriter, and actress
- FKA Twigs (born 1988), singer-songwriter, producer, and dancer
- Micheal Ward (born 1997), actor
- Jamael Westman (born 1991), actor
- Caron Wheeler (born 1963), singer-songwriter; Grammy Award winner
- Willard White (born 1946), operatic bass baritone
- Ricky Whittle (born 1981), actor
- Kedar Williams-Stirling (born 1994), actor
- Layton Williams (born 1994), actor and singer
- Lola Young (born 2001), musician
- Luke Youngblood (born 1986), actor
- Luke Youngblood (born 1986), actor
- David Grant (born 1956), singer and vocal coach

== Fashion designers and models ==
- Leomie Anderson (born 1993), model and fashion designer. The first black British Victoria's Secret Angel
- Munroe Bergdorf (born 1987), model and activist. The first transgender model in the UK for L'Oréal
- Naomi Campbell (born 1970), supermodel and actress. The first black model to appear on the front cover of Time, French Vogue, Russian Vogue and the September issue of American Vogue
- Nicholas Daley, fashion designer
- Jourdan Dunn (born 1990), supermodel and actress. The first black British model to enter the Forbes model rich list
- Bruce Oldfield (born 1950), fashion designer
- Tessa Prendergast (1928–2001), fashion designer, actress and socialite. Designer of the taboo-breaking white bikini worn by Ursula Andress in the 1962 film Dr. No
- Martine Rose (born 1980), menswear designer
- Bianca Saunders, fashion designer. Winner of the ANDAM Fashion Award for young talent
- Grace Wales Bonner (born 1992), fashion designer

== Inventors ==
- Jak Beula (born 1963), inventor of the multi-award-winning board game, Nubian Jak
- Nira Chamberlain (born 1969), creator of a mathematical cost capability trade-off model for HMS Queen Elizabeth and the inventor of a long multiplication method used in some UK schools
- Geoff Palmer (born 1940), inventor of the barley abrasion process, a patented technique that speeds up the production of malt from grain and which is used by the British brewing industry

== Religion ==
- Rev Rose Hudson-Wilkin (born 1961), Bishop of Dover and the first black female to become a Church of England bishop. She was also the first woman and the first black person to serve as Chaplain to the Speaker of the House of Commons. She also held the role of Queen's Chaplain.
- Oliver Lyseight (1919–2006), founder of one of Britain's largest black majority churches, and spiritual leader to the Windrush generation

== Sports ==
- Viv Anderson (born 1956), retired footballer and coach. One of the first black football players to represent England in a full international match
- Michail Antonio (born 1990), footballer
- John Barnes (born 1963), retired footballer
- Daniel Bell-Drummond (born 1993), cricketer
- Darren Bent (born 1984), retired footballer
- Luther Blissett (born 1958), retired footballer
- Frank Bruno (born 1961), retired professional boxer
- Frazier Campbell (born 1987), footballer
- Sol Campbell (born 1974), retired footballer and manager
- Mark Chamberlain (born 1961), retired footballer
- Neville Chamberlain (born 1960), retired footballer
- Linford Christie (born 1960), retired sprinter
- Andy Cole (born 1971), retired footballer
- Garth Crooks (born 1958), retired footballer and pundit. Elected as the first black chairman of the Professional Footballers’ Association
- Laurie Cunningham (1956–1989), first ever British player to sign for Real Madrid
- Tasha Danvers (born 1977), athlete
- Bobby De Cordova-Reid (born 1993), footballer
- Lloyd "Lindy" Delapenha (1927–2017), first black footballer to win a championship medal
- Clayton Donaldson (born 1984), footballer
- Desmond Douglas (born 1955), table tennis player
- Leon Edwards (born 1991), professional mixed martial artist
- Dame Jessica Ennis-Hill (born 1986), retired track and field athlete
- Chris Eubank (born 1966), retired professional boxer
- Demarai Gray (born 1996), footballer
- Mason Greenwood (born 2001), footballer
- Jeremy Guscott (born 1965), retired rugby union player
- Ellery Hanley (born 1961), retired rugby league player and coach
- Audley Harrison (born 1971), retired professional boxer
- David Haye (born 1980), boxer
- Michael Hector (born 1992), footballer
- Deta Hedman (born 1959), world champion darts player
- Mason Holgate (born 1996), footballer
- Dame Kelly Holmes (born 1970), middle-distance runner and Olympic gold medallist
- Colin Jackson (born 1967), retired hurdler
- David James (born 1970), retired professional footballer and goalkeeper
- Aaron Lennon (born 1987), footballer
- Jack Leslie (1901–1988), footballer
- Denise Lewis (born 1972), retired track and field athlete, sports presenter
- Lennox Lewis (born 1965), retired professional boxer
- Devon Malcolm (born 1963), retired cricketer
- Adrian Mariappa (born 1986), footballer
- Ovill McKenzie (born 1979), retired professional boxer
- Ishmael Miller (born 1987), footballer
- Wes Morgan (born 1984), footballer
- Ravel Morrison (born 1993), footballer
- Alex Oxlade-Chamberlain (born 1993), footballer
- Christian Oxlade-Chamberlain (born 1998), footballer
- Michael Page (born 1987), professional boxer and mixed martial artist; mother was from Jamaica
- Jimmy Peters (born 1879), first black man to play rugby union for England
- Nathan Redmond (born 1994), footballer
- Jason Robinson (born 1974), rugby international, first black captain of the England national rugby union team. Also the first former professional rugby league player to captain the England rugby union team
- Danny Rose (born 1990), footballer
- Ralph Rowe (died 2013), Britain's first black Paralympian
- Tessa Sanderson (born 1956), athlete, the first and only British woman to win gold at an Olympic throwing event, and the first black British woman ever to win Olympic gold
- Alex Scott (born 1984), sports presenter, pundit and footballer. The first female football pundit at a World Cup for the BBC, the first female pundit on Sky Sports Super Sunday, and the first female to be a permanent presenter of Football Focus
- Chris Smalling (born 1989), footballer
- Dina Asher Smith, sprinter
- Louis Smith (born 1989), retired gymnast
- Djed Spence (born 2000), footballer
- Dujon Sterling (born 1999), footballer
- Raheem Sterling (born 1994), footballer
- Worrell Sterling (born 1965), retired football player
- Daniel Sturridge (born 1989), footballer
- Andros Townsend (born 1991), footballer
- Theo Walcott (born 1989), footballer for Everton FC
- Kyle Walker (born 1990), footballer
- Dillian Whyte (born 1988), boxer
- Ian Wright (born 1963), retired footballer
- Ashley Young (born 1985), footballer
- Delano McCoy-Splatt (born 2004), footballer

== Writing and journalism ==
- Trish Adudu (born 1969), journalist, newsreader and TV presenter
- Akala (born 1983), journalist, author, activist and poet
- Raymond Antrobus (born 1986), poet, educator and writer. The first poet to win the Rathbones Folio Prize for his collection The Perseverance
- Barbara Blake-Hannah (born 1941), author and Journalist. British television's first black on-camera reporter and interviewer
- Valerie Bloom (born 1956), author and poet
- Anne Brodbelt (1751–1827), letter writer and social observer
- Syd Burke (1938–2010), broadcaster, journalist and photographer
- Candice Carty-Williams (born 1989), writer and author. She was the first black woman to win the British Book Awards "Book of the Year" accolade for her novel Queenie
- Lady Colin Campbell (born 1949), author and socialite
- Patricia Cumper (born 1954), playwright, producer, director, theatre administrator, critic and commentator
- Ferdinand Dennis (born 1956), writer, broadcaster, journalist and lecturer
- Salena Godden, broadcaster, author, activist, memoirist and essayist
- Colin Grant (born 1961), author
- Victor Headley (born 1959), author and producer
- Ben Hunte (born 1992), journalist and reporter
- Linton Kwesi Johnson (born 1952), poet and activist
- Darren Jordon (born 1960), journalist
- Andrea Levy (1956–2019), author, the first writer of colour whose pen would join the Royal Society of Literature's historic collection
- Una Marson (1905–1965), writer, producer of plays and radio programmes. She was the first black female radio producer at the BBC
- Clive Myrie (born 1964), journalist, newsreader and TV presenter
- Paul Mendez (born 1982), author
- Zadie Smith (born 1975), author
- Vivian Virtue (1911–1998), translator and broadcaster
- Charlene White (born 1980), journalist, newsreader and TV presenter
- Kerry Young (born 1955), author
- Benjamin Zephaniah (born 1958), author and dub poet

== Others ==
- Fay Allen (1938–2021), first black woman police constable in the United Kingdom
- Vanley Burke (born 1951), photographer and artist
- Sergeant William Robinson Clarke (1895–1981), World War I airman who was the first black pilot to fly for Britain
- Joe Clough (1885–1976), first Black bus driver in London
- Yvonne Conolly (1939–2021), Britain's first female black headteacher
- Kevin Fenton (born 1966), epidemiologist and a regional director at Public Health England
- Wilston Samuel Jackson (1927–2018), fireman and Britain's first black train driver
- George "Fowokan" Kelly (born 1943), sculptor
- Errol Lloyd (born 1943), artist, writer, art critic, editor and arts administrator
- Ludlow Moody (1892–1981), doctor
- Ronald Moody (1900–1984), sculptor, Moody crater on Mercury was named after him in November 2008
- Mary Seacole (1805–1881), nurse and businesswoman; voted the greatest black Briton

== Fictional characters ==
- Lee Jordan, fictional character

== See also ==
- List of Jamaicans
- List of Jamaican Americans
