= British Jamaicans =

British people of Jamaican ancestry

Total population
- Residents born in Jamaica; 146,401 (2001 Census); 340,000 (2007 "Jamaica: Mapping exercise"); 160,776 (2011 Census); 137,000 (2015 ONS estimate); Population of Jamaican origin 300,000 (2007 Jamaican High Commission estimate)

Regions with significant populations
- Greater London (Croydon, Hackney, Brixton), Birmingham, Manchester, Nottingham, Bristol, Leeds, Leicester, Wolverhampton

Languages
- English (British English, Jamaican English), Jamaican Patois

Religion
- Majority of Christianity; Rastafari · Others

Related ethnic groups
- British African-Caribbean community, British mixed-race community, Chinese Jamaicans, Jamaicans of African ancestry, Jamaican Americans, Jamaican Canadians, Jamaican Jews, Indo-Jamaicans, Jamaican Australians

British Jamaicans (or Jamaican British people) are British people who were born in Jamaica or who are of Jamaican descent. The community is well into its third generation and consists of around 300,000 individuals, the second-largest Jamaican population living outside of Jamaica, after the United States. The Office for National Statistics estimates that in 2015, some 137,000 people born in Jamaica were resident in the UK. The number of Jamaican nationals is estimated to be significantly lower, at 49,000 in 2015.

Jamaicans have been present in the UK since the start of the 20th century; however, by far the largest wave of migration occurred after the Second World War. During the 1950s, Britain's economy was suffering greatly and the nation was plagued with high labour shortages. The British government looked to its overseas colonies for help and encouraged migration in an effort to fill the many job vacancies. Jamaicans, alongside other Caribbean, African and South Asian groups, moved in their hundreds of thousands to the United Kingdom. Almost half of all the men who came from the Caribbean to the UK throughout the 1950s had previously worked in skilled positions or possessed excellent employment credentials. Most Jamaicans settled in Greater London, working for London Transport, British Rail, NHS England.

== History and settlement ==
The Caribbean island nation of Jamaica was a British colony between 1655 and 1962. More than 300 years of British rule changed the face of the island considerably (having previously been under Spanish rule, which depopulated the indigenous Arawak and Taino communities) – and 92.1% of Jamaicans are descended from sub-Saharan Africans who were brought over during the Atlantic slave trade. Jamaica is the third most populous English-speaking nation in the Americas and the local dialect of English is known as Jamaican Patois. The tight-knit link between Jamaica and the United Kingdom remains evident to this day. There has been a long and well established Jamaican community in the United Kingdom since near the beginning of the 20th century. Many Jamaicans fought for Britain in World War I, with the British West Indies Regiment recruiting solely from the British overseas colonies in the Caribbean.

Jamaican passengers disembark the HMT Empire Windrush at the Port of Tilbury, June 1948

Volunteers originally only came from four nations (excluding Jamaica), however as the regiment grew thousands of Jamaican men were recruited and ultimately made up around two-thirds of the 15,600 strong regiment. The British West Indies Regiment fought for Britain in the Sinai and Palestine Campaign as well as the East African Campaign. Many of these men became the first permanent Jamaican immigrants in the United Kingdom after World War I, some of whom also subsequently fought for the country in World War II. Despite this, by far the largest wave of Jamaican migration to the United Kingdom including people of all genders and ages occurred in the middle of the 20th century. A major hurricane in August 1944 ravaged eastern Jamaica leading to numerous fatalities and major economic loss after crops were destroyed by flooding. This acted as a push factor in the migration of Jamaicans and at the time by far the largest pull factor was the promise of jobs in Britain. Post-war Britain was suffering from significant labour shortage and looked to its overseas colonies for help, British Rail, the NHS and London transport were noted as being the largest recruiters.

On 21 June 1948, the HMT Empire Windrush arrived in Britain with, among other migrants from the Caribbean, 492 Jamaicans on-board who had been invited to the country to work; they officially disembarked from the ship on 22 June 1948. Many more followed, as the steady flow of Jamaicans to the United Kingdom was maintained due to the continuing labour shortage. Between 1955 and 1968, 191,330 Jamaicans settled in the UK. These first-generation migrants created the foundation of a community that is now well into its third if not fourth generation.

Jamaicans continued to migrate to the United Kingdom during the 1970s and 1980s, albeit in smaller numbers, the majority of these people were from poor households and went to extreme lengths to get to Britain. There is an uneven distribution of household wealth throughout Jamaica and during the economic crisis of the 1990s lower class Jamaicans continued to migrate in significant numbers. A lot of these later arrivals came from Jamaica's capital and largest city, Kingston where the divide between rich and poor is much more evident than other places on the island. Most first-generation immigrants moved to Britain in order to seek an improved standard of living, escape violence, or to find employment. Almost half of all the men who came from the Caribbean to the UK throughout the 1950s had previously worked in skilled positions or possessed excellent employment credentials. However, many found their access restricted to jobs the local population considered undesirable, such as general labouring, or to jobs that demanded anti-social hours. Over half the men from the Caribbean initially accepted jobs with a lower status than their skills and experience qualified them for. Jamaicans, therefore, followed the pattern of other irregular immigrant groups where they tended to work in poorly paid jobs in poor working conditions as these were often the only ones available to them.

Throughout the late 20th century, the Jamaican community in the United Kingdom has been brought into the spotlight due to the involvement of Jamaicans in race-related riots. The first notable event to occur was the 1958 Notting Hill race riots when an argument between local white youths and a Jamaican man, alongside increasing tensions between both communities lead to several nights of disturbances, rioting and attacks.

Due to instances of police brutality by the Metropolitan Police, the sus law which overwhelmingly targeted British Jamaicans to be stopped and searched, and the unprovoked shooting of a Jamaican woman in her Lambeth home after police believed she was hiding her wanted son, a riot broke out in Brixton in 1985. In 2005, another series of race riots in Birmingham occurred as a result of the alleged rape of a 14-year-old Jamaican girl by a group of up to 20 South Asian men including the Pakistani store owner it was reported she initially stole from. The Murder of Stephen Lawrence occurred in 1993, the London teenager of Jamaican parentage was stabbed to death in a racially motivated attack. The murder was handled in such a bad way by the Metropolitan Police that an inquiry into this established that the force had been institutionally racist, the investigation has been called 'one of the most important moments in the modern history of criminal justice in Britain' and contributed heavily to the creation and passing of the Criminal Justice Act 2003. Many Jamaicans live in the UK having no legal status, having come at a period of less strict immigration policies. Some Jamaican social groups have claimed asylum under the 1951 Convention Relating to the Status of Refugees, this only continued until 2003 when Jamaica was placed on the Non-Suspensive Appeal list when restrictions on UK visas came into place, making it more difficult for Jamaicans to travel to the UK.

== Demographics ==
=== Population and distribution ===
The 2011 UK Census recorded 159,170 people born in Jamaica resident in England, 925 in Wales, 564 in Scotland and 117 in Northern Ireland, making a total Jamaica-born population of 160,776. According to the previous census, held in 2001, 146,401 people born in Jamaica were living in the UK, making them the seventh-largest foreign-born group in the UK at the time. The equivalent figure for 2015 has been estimated at 137,000 by the Office for National Statistics, making them the 16th-largest foreign-born group. The Jamaican High Commission in London estimates that there are around 800,000 British people of Jamaican origin in the UK.

Jamaicans in the UK are fairly widely dispersed, although there are some locations with much larger numbers and higher concentrations of Jamaican people than others – namely London. The Greater London area is home to some 250,000 Jamaicans, whilst the second largest number which is 45,000 individuals can be found in the West Midlands. 25,000 Jamaicans are thought to live in South West England, 18,000 in the East Midlands, 40,400 in South East England, 14,000 in North West England and 11,500 in Yorkshire and the Humber. Much smaller numbers are located in Wales (3,000) and Scotland, which the International Organization for Migration suggests that a mere 40 Jamaicans call home. Within the stated regions of the United Kingdom, most people of Jamaican origin can be found in the larger cities and towns. The largest Jamaican communities in the UK are listed below (all figures are 2007 estimates by the IOM, as there is not a specific "Jamaican" tick-box in the UK census to identify where Jamaicans live within the country).

Year	Number of Jamaicans granted British citizenship	Naturalisation by residence	Naturalisation by marriage	Registration of a minor child	Registration by other means
1997	732	327	279	114	12
1998	1,370	571	564	221	14
1999	1,437	678	526	226	7
2000	1,882	927	664	281	10
2001	2,070	1,025	710	330	0
2002	2,025	1,035	705	285	0
2003	2,795	1,285	985	520	5
2004	3,180	1,415	1,060	640	65
2005	3,515	1,585	1,080	770	80
2006	2,525	1,110	710	655	55
2007	3,165	1,575	825	725	45
2008	2,715	1,275	695	700	45

- London – 250,000
  Brent, Croydon, Hackney, Haringey, Lambeth, Lewisham, Southwark, Waltham Forest and Enfield.
- Birmingham – 35,000
  Handsworth, Winson Green, Aston, Ladywood, Newtown and Lozells
- Bristol – 20,000
  St. Paul's and Redfield
- Nottingham – 12,200
  Hyson Green, St. Ann's
- Wolverhampton – 10,000 - Bilston, Wednesfield, Whitmore Reans
- Manchester – 10,000
  Old Trafford, Moss Side, Cheetham Hill, Chorlton, Didsbury, Wythanshawe, Urmston and Sale
- Gloucester – 4,000
  Barton, Tredworth
- Leeds – 4,000–5,000
  Chapeltown and Harehills
- Leicester – 3,000–4,000
  Highfields and St Matthews
- Sheffield – 2,000
- Liverpool – 1,000–2,000
  Granby and Toxteth
- Preston – 800
- Dudley Metropolitan Borough – 3625
- Sandwell – 13,103 - West Bromwich, Oldbury, Smethwick, Wednesbury

Besides the above locations, the IOM has also identified the following towns and cities as having notable Jamaican communities: Bath, Bedford, Bradford, Cardiff, Coventry, Derby, Doncaster, Huddersfield, Ipswich, Liskeard, Luton, Middlesbrough, Milton Keynes, Northampton, Swansea, Swindon and Truro. The majority of British Jamaicans are in the age range of 18 and 45, and investigation by the IOM into the ages of community members found that it is more or less on par with the general makeup of the British population. Around 8% of people investigated were under the age of 25, around 13% were in between the ages of 25 and 34. 22% were between 35 and 44, 27% were between 45 and 54 whilst 18% of respondents were aged between 55 and 64. The remainder were 65 years of age or older. As stated earlier, this investigation only involved a few hundred community members, but it is a balanced representation of the Jamaican community in the UK.

Evidence that the Jamaican British community is a long established one is the fact that only around 10% of Jamaicans in the UK moved to the country in the decade leading up to 2007. In terms of citizenship, all Jamaicans who moved to the UK prior to Jamaican Independence in 1962 were automatically granted British citizenship because Jamaica was an overseas colony of the country. Jamaican immigrants must now apply for citizenship if they wish to become British nationals. The above table shows the number of Jamaicans granted citizenship in recent years.

=== Religion ===
The 2001 UK Census showed that 73.7% of Black Caribbeans adhered to the Christian faith, whilst 11.3% of respondents claimed to be atheist. This ranks as a higher percentage of Christians per head compared to Black Africans (68.8%), but a slightly lower percentage than White British Christians (75.7%). Jamaicans and people of Jamaican descent are regular religious worshippers and the majority of them worship across a wide range of mainly Black led Christian denominations as well as in the more mainstream Anglican and Roman Catholic churches. Over recent years the number of regular White worshipers in Anglican churches in particular have decreased significantly, numbers however have been maintained by Black Caribbeans and (mostly Jamaicans) who have taken their places. Other common Christian denominations followed by Jamaicans in the UK include Pentecostalism, the Seventh-day Adventist Church, Jehovah's Witnesses, the Pilgrims Union Church, the Baptist church and Methodism.

== Culture ==
=== Cuisine ===
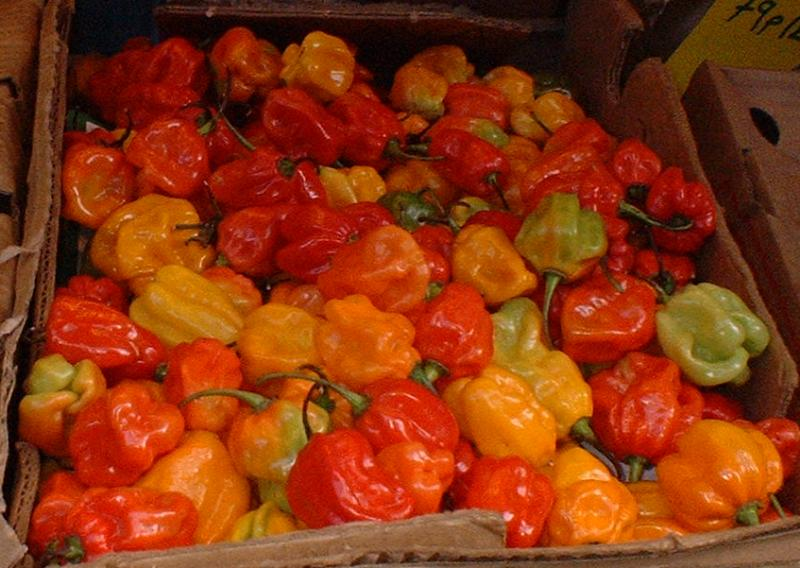
Scotch bonnet peppers imported from the Caribbean on sale at London's Brixton Market. The peppers are a key ingredient of "Jerk" dishes

The earliest Jamaican immigrants to post-war Britain found differences in diet and availability of food an uncomfortable challenge. In later years, as the community developed and food imports became more accessible to all, grocers specialising in Caribbean produce opened in British high streets. Caribbean restaurants can now also be found in most areas of Britain where Jamaicans and other such groups reside, serving traditional Caribbean dishes such as curry goat, fried dumplings, and ackee and saltfish (the national dish of Jamaica). "Jerk" is a style of cooking from Jamaica in which meats (including pork and chicken) are dry-rubbed or wet marinated with a very hot spice mixture. The best known Caribbean food brands in the UK are Dunn's River, Walkerswood and Grace Foods. Grace Foods is originally from Jamaica but is now a multi national conglomerate.

In March 2007, Grace Foods bought ENCO Products, owners of the Dunn's River Brand, as well as "Nurishment", a flavoured, sweetened enriched milk drink, and the Encona Sauce Range. Grace Foods supplies around one third of products in the UK and has global headquarters in Kingston, Jamaica. Walkerswood, also of Jamaican origin, is now owned by New Castle Limited and has a range of sauce and marinade products. In 2001, Port Royal started manufacturing Jamaican patties in London, which are available in supermarkets and Caribbean takeaways across the UK. A patty is the Caribbean version of a Cornish Pasty, pastry with a meat filling. Following its success in 2007 on TV show Dragons' Den, the Levi Roots brand has grown into a multi-million pound enterprise. Reggae Reggae Sauce and other Levi Roots products are now stocked in all major UK supermarkets. In 2021, Grace Foods launched its Irie Eats Caribbean street food range at Tesco. This came in response to 2021 Mintel data, which revealed that nearly half (49%) of Brits would like to try Caribbean cuisine at home. Various other Jamaican brands have expanded their presence in the UK food and grocery market.

Jamaican and Caribbean cuisine is becoming increasingly popular in the UK. Caribbean food topped a (2015) list of cuisine types that British diners want more of on menus. According to a report by the Caribbean Export Development Agency (Caribbean Export), the number of Caribbean restaurants in the UK tripled in the 12 months leading up to August 2019. Jerk chicken has been named as the UK's favourite Caribbean dish.

=== Fashion ===
There have been a number of British Jamaicans who have made their mark in the world of fashion. Supermodel Naomi Campbell was the first black model to appear on the front cover of Time, French Vogue, Russian Vogue and the September issue of American Vogue. Jourdan Dunn became the first black model to walk for Prada since Naomi Campbell and was chosen as the face of Maybelline New York in 2014. Dunn became the first black British model to enter the Forbes model rich list and is considered an icon and supermodel. Munroe Bergdorf has walked several catwalks for brands including Gypsy Sport and was the first transgender model in the UK for L'Oréal. Leomie Anderson has walked in various Victoria's Secret Fashion Shows and became first black British Victoria's Secret Angel.

Bruce Oldfield is best known for his couture and bridalwear designs and has a client list that includes Queen Rania of Jordan, Jerry Hall, Samantha Cameron, Charlotte Rampling, Jemima Khan, Sienna Miller, Rihanna, Catherine Zeta-Jones and the late Diana, Princess of Wales. Oldfield collaborated with McDonald's in 2008 and received an OBE for his services to the British fashion industry. Another notable contributor is Grace Wales Bonner who founded the London-based label Wales Bonner. Originally specialising in menswear, her designs have earned several prestigious awards. Bianca Saunders is the British holder of the ANDAM Fashion Award for young talent and her designs have been picked up by Ssense, matchesfashion.com and Machine-A. Other notable contributors include Nicholas Daley and Martine Rose.

=== Literature ===
British Jamaicans have made significant contributions to British literature. Poet James Berry was among the first Caribbean writers to come to Britain after the 1948 British Nationality Act. Berry's writing often explored the relationship between black and white communities and he was in the forefront of championing Caribbean/British writing. In 1981, he won the Poetry Society's National Poetry Competition, the first poet of Caribbean origin to win the prestigious prize. Andrew Salkey was another leading figure of the first wave of post-war Caribbean writers who settled and worked in London. He was the main presenter of BBC's Caribbean Voices and was a key figure in the formation of the Caribbean Artists Movement. Berry, Salkey, Hall and other first wave writers gave Caribbean literature an international audience for the first time and helped establish Caribbean writing as an important viewpoint within English literature.

More contemporary contributions come from authors including Andrea Levy whose novel Small Island won the Whitbread Book of the Year and the Orange Prize for Fiction, one of Britain's highest literary honours. The book also earned Levy the 2005 Commonwealth Writers' Prize and was voted Best of the Best Orange prize novel Small Island tells the tangled history of Jamaica and UK through the eyes of characters who in 1948 arrive at Tilbury, London, on the HMT Empire Windrush. BBC News included Small Island on its list of the 100 most influential novels and it was made into a two-part television drama of the same title. Levy became the first writer of colour whose pen would join the Royal Society of Literature's historic collection, which includes pens belonging to Charles Dickens, George Eliot, T. S. Eliot and Lord Byron.

Zadie Smith won the Anisfield-Wolf Book Award, the Commonwealth Writers' Best Book Award (Eurasia Section) and the Orange Prize for On Beauty. Smith's acclaimed first novel, White Teeth (2000), was a portrait of contemporary multicultural London, drawing from her own upbringing with an English father and a Jamaican mother. White Teeth was an international best seller and won multiple accolades, including the James Tait Black Memorial Prize for fiction, the Whitbread Book Award in category best first novel, the Guardian First Book Award and the Betty Trask Award. Time magazine included the novel in its list of the 100 best English-language novels from 1923 to 2005 and the novel was adapted for television in 2002.

At the 2020 British Book Awards, Candice Carty-Williams became the first black woman to win the "Book of the Year" accolade, for her novel Queenie. The novel, which describes the life and loves of Queenie Jenkins, a vibrant, young British-Jamaican, received positive reviews and was marketed as "a black Bridget Jones". Queenie entered the Sunday Times Bestseller hardback chart at number two and went on to win numerous accolades. A TV adaptation of Queenie has been announced as being in development for Channel 4.

In July 2020, Linton Kwesi Johnson received the PEN Pinter Prize and was described as "a Living legend", "a poet, reggae icon, academic and campaigner, whose impact on the cultural landscape over the last half century has been colossal and multi-generational". Other notable contributors include Ferdinand Dennis, Winsome Pinnock, Victor Headley, Benjamin Zephaniah and Raymond Antrobus, who became the first poet to win the Rathbones Folio Prize for his collection The Perseverance.

=== Media ===
An investigation by the IOM found that in general Jamaicans in the UK don't have a particular preference of favourite newspaper, many choose to read local newspapers and the national British press (such as The Guardian the Daily Mail and Metro), however the investigation also showed that some 80% of British Jamaicans show an interest in Black or ethnic minority newspapers. The Weekly Gleaner which as its name suggests is a weekly publication distributed in the UK and contains specific news from the Jamaica Daily Gleaner. The Voice closely follows in terms of readership; this weekly tabloid newspaper, based in the UK but owned by the Jamaican GV Media Group and established by Val McCalla (who was born in Jamaica), covers a variety of stories that are aimed solely at the British African-Caribbean community. Other popular newspapers and magazines aimed at the Jamaican and Black British populations in the UK in general include the New Nation, The Big Eye News, Pride Magazine, The Caribbean Times and formerly Black Voice.

Radio is the most popular form of media within the British Jamaican community: approximately 75% of Jamaicans in the UK listen to the radio on a daily basis or very often. Statistically pirate radio stations (which are stations which have no formal licence to broadcast) are by far the most popular within the community. The same investigation as stated above showed that around one quarter of people surveyed preferred to listen to a specific pirate radio station. Most pirate stations are community based, but there are some that broadcast to the whole country, the most frequently listened to pirate stations by British Jamaicans include Vibes FM, Powerjam, Irie FM and Roots FM. Out of all legally licensed radio stations in the UK, the single most popular one prevailed as Premier Christian Radio; the BBC also has a relatively large Jamaican listening audience. Jamaican-born Neil Kenlock co-founded Choice FM in London, the first successful radio station granted a licence to cater for the black community in Britain. New Style Radio 98.7FM in Birmingham are also popular within the community (both of which are Black orientated).

=== Music ===
A wide variety of music has its origins in Jamaica and in the 1960s when the UK's Jamaican community was beginning to emerge there was one hugely popular music genre, ska. The genre which combines elements of Caribbean mento and calypso with American jazz and rhythm and blues became a major part of Jamaican mid-20th-century culture, and the popularity of it also became evident in the Jamaican expatriate community in the UK. Despite the presence of Jamaicans in a number of countries at that time (such as the United States), ska music only really triumphed in the UK. In 1962 there were three music labels releasing Jamaican music in the UK (Melodisc, Blue Beat Records and Island Records), as more and more Jamaicans moved to the UK, the country became a more lucrative market for artists than Jamaica itself. "My Boy Lollipop" by Millie was one of the first ska records to influence the British population in general having charted at No. 2 on the UK Singles Chart in 1964. Reggae music is another genre that was introduced to the UK through migrating Jamaicans.

The influence of Jamaicans in the UK has had a profound effect on British music over the last 50 years. By the end of the 1960s, Jamaican culture had participated in the birth of the first wave UK skinhead movement and had impacted on punk rock in the 1970s. Significantly, this led to new genres of music coming out of London, Birmingham, Coventry and Bristol.

In Birmingham in the 1970s and 1980s, reggae was very popular and three of the leading British reggae groups of the time hailed from the city; UB40 (who have now sold over 70 million records worldwide), Musical Youth and Grammy Award winners Steel Pulse. The large Jamaican population was also an influence on the emerging Indian genre bhangra that grew out of the city's large South Asian community.

Following punk and reggae came "Two Tone". Often regarded as the second wave of Ska, many of the Two Tone bands had been inspired by Jamaican Ska records of the 1960s. With a faster tempo than Jamaican Ska, Two Tone "Ska" was commercially successful in the UK from 1979 until the early 1980s. The Specials from Coventry, The Beat from Birmingham, The Selector from Coventry, and Madness from Camden in London, are the best known examples of Two Tone bands.

In late 1970s London, a fusing of Jamaican reggae with a more British pop sensibility led to "lovers rock", a melodic but distinctively British version of reggae.

In Bristol, a decade later, sound-system culture combining with the emerging digital sampling technology led to the emergence of trip hop. A distinctive mixture of heavy basslines and sometimes complex arrangements and samples, trip hop was born in the St Paul's area of Bristol from the likes of Smith and Mighty, Massive Attack and Portishead.

After the first wave of house music in the early 1990s, the rhythmic influence of reggae produced the dance music genre "jungle", in which sped-up beats became popular in clubs combined with reggae sounding "dub" basslines and MC chants. This genre of music became more widely known as "drum 'n bass" by the close of the decade, with the former incarnation now being referred to as "oldschool jungle".

Other British music genres spawned through the influence of Jamaicans living in the UK are grime, funky house and dubstep.

The London-born Julian Marley son of Bob Marley and member of the Rastafari movement and David Hinds lead singer of the reggae band Steel Pulse helped popularise reggae and Jamaican music in general in the UK. A number of other British Jamaican musicians specialise in reggae and traditional Jamaican music, including Grammy Award nominees Maxi Priest and Musical Youth. Although reggae music originated in Jamaica, reggae musicians and reggae-influenced musicians now belong to a variety of ethnicities and nationalities in the UK (see white reggae and mixed race reggae). Second-, third- and fourth-generation British Jamaican musicians have helped bridge the gap between traditional Jamaican music and contemporary global music. The X Factor Series 5 winner Alexandra Burke focuses mainly on the R&B, pop, soul genres, Chip primarily focuses on the hip-hop, grime, R&B and pop rap genres whilst Goldie is a popular electronic music artist. This indicates the diverse array of music produced by the current generation of British Jamaican musicians. Amongst some other current contemporary British musicians of Jamaican ancestry are Keisha Buchanan, Academy Award nominee Celeste, Alesha Dixon, Jade Ewen, Jamelia, Kano, Beverley Knight, Lianne La Havas, Grammy Award nominee Mahalia, Grammy Award Winner Ella Mai, Grammy Award nominee Nao, Leigh-Anne Pinnock, Grammy Award nominee Jorja Smith, and double Grammy Award winner Caron Wheeler.

=== Sport ===
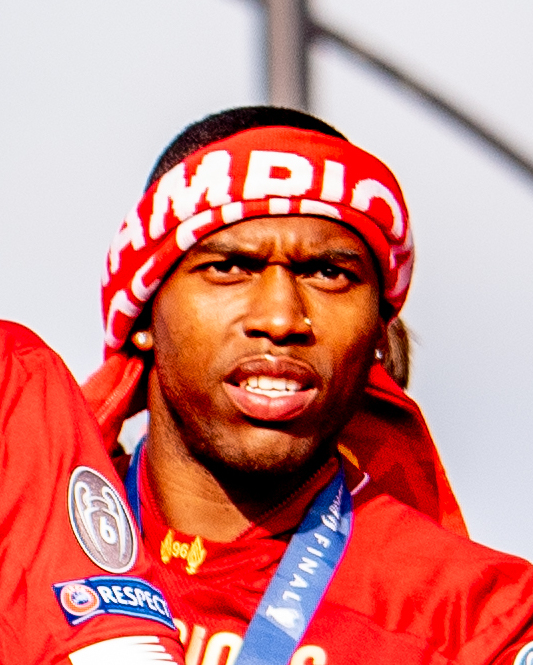
Former Liverpool and England striker Daniel Sturridge, who was born in Birmingham to Jamaican parents

British Jamaicans have contributed significantly to UK sporting successes. Tessa Sanderson won javelin gold at the 1984 Summer Olympics and is the only British athlete to win an Olympic throwing event. Linford Christie was the first man to win every major 100m title in world athletics (and to this date the only British man to have done so). Denise Lewis won heptathlon gold at the 2000 Sydney Olympics, a feat that was repeated by Jessica Ennis-Hill at the 2012 Summer Olympics. Kelly Holmes was one of the success stories of the 2004 Summer Olympics having won multiple gold medals and still holding numerous British records in distance running. Another 2004 success story was Jason Gardener and Mark Lewis-Francis, who won the gold medal in the 4 × 100 metres relay with Darren Campbell and Marlon Devonish. Louis Smith won bronze in the men's pommel horse event at the 2008 Beijing Olympics, Britain's first Olympics gymnastics medal since 1908. Other notable British athletes of Jamaican origin who have successfully competed in the Olympic Games include Olympic silver medalist Colin Jackson, Olympic bronze medalist Tasha Danvers and the fastest woman in British history, Olympic bronze medalist, Dina Asher-Smith.

Besides athletics and gymnastics, British Jamaicans have also become heavily associated with the sport of boxing. Frank Bruno is one of the more notable individuals, he won 40 out of 45 of his contests and held the title of WBC heavyweight champion in the mid-1990s. Chris Eubank also held world boxing titles including middleweight and super middleweight champion (his son, Chris Eubank Jr. is also a boxing champion). Lennox Lewis of dual British/Canadian citizenship is one of the most successful boxers in the sports history, he is one of only five boxers who have won the heavyweight championship three times. Errol Christie is also a former boxer, he is the Guinness World Record holder for achieving the most amateur title wins. At the Sydney Olympics of 2000, Audley Harrison became Britain's first heavyweight gold medalist. In more recent times David Haye has become the new face of British Jamaican boxing, Haye has won numerous titles and in 2009 beat Nikolai Valuev to become the WBA Heavyweight Champion (the fifth Briton to do so, and the third British Jamaican – the other two being Britons of Nigerian origin). Dillian Whyte, another well established British boxer who was born in Jamaica, has held the WBC interim heavyweight title since March 2021.

Clive Sullivan was the first black captain for a Great British team, in any sport, and captained the Great Britain team to victory in the 1972 Rugby League World Cup. Jason Robinson was the first black player to captain the England national rugby union team and was part of the 2003 Rugby World Cup victory. Ellery Hanley became the first man to captain his side to three consecutive Challenge Cup victories. He is the only player to win the coveted Man of Steel award on three occasions and is widely considered to be one of the greatest players in rugby league history. Other notable rugby players of Jamaican heritage include Jimmy Peters, who was England's first black rugby union international, Des Drummond and Jeremy Guscott. Viv Anderson, became the first Black player to represent the England senior men’s team in a full international match on November 29, 1978, John Barnes is the most capped English Jamaican to have played for the England national football team, and a number of the current national team players have origins in Jamaica, including Darren Bent, Aaron Lennon, Raheem Sterling, Theo Walcott, Daniel Sturridge, Kyle Walker, Danny Rose, Ashley Young and Alex Oxlade-Chamberlain. In turn, Nottingham born and raised Wes Morgan chose to represent the Jamaica national football team which he captained. In 2021 alone in the Jamaican squad there were 11 British born and raised players: Amari'i Bell, Liam Moore, Ethan Pinnock, Wes Harding, Michael Hector, Adrian Mariappa, Kasey Palmer, Andre Gray, Jamal Lowe, Greg Leigh, and Bobby De Cordova-Reid.

There have been a number of British Jamaican wrestlers and weightlifters who have made their mark on the sport. Hailed as Britain's greatest-ever weightlifter, Louis Martin won Olympic medals in weightlifting at Rome 1960 and Tokyo 1964 and claimed four World Championship titles, three Commonwealth golds and set two official world records. Ralph Rowe was Britain's first black Paralympian and won weightlifting gold at the Heidelberg 1972 Games. Fitz Lloyd Walker was the first black wrestler to represent Great Britain at the Olympic Games and achieved a bronze medal for England at the 1986 Commonwealth Games. Walker is in the Guinness Book of World Records for winning the British Wrestling Championships 14 years in a row.

Cricket has long been a popular pastime among British Jamaicans (though interest has waned since the 1980s). Several British Jamaican cricketers have represented England, making some pivotal contributions to the side. Norman Cowans was the first West Indies-born fast bowler to play Test cricket for England and was instrumental in England's victory at the MCG in 1982. Cowans took a match-winning 6 for 77, following his first innings 2 for 69, in England's dramatic 3 run victory. This victory sent The Ashes series to Sydney for the deciding Fifth Test, which ended in a draw. Devon Malcom played in 40 Test matches for England and took part in 30 One Day Internationals. On the West Indies tour in 1989/90, Malcolm made a major impact and excelled as England won the First Test. He then took ten wickets in the Second Test and was named man of the match in the Third Test. At The Oval, against South Africa, Malcolm would go on to record figures of 9/57- propelling England to a series-levelling eight-wicket victory in August 1994. It remains one of the best bowling figures in Test cricket history. Ebony Rainford-Brent was the first black woman to play for England and was a member of the England team that won the 2009 Women's Cricket World Cup in Australia and the 2009 Women's World Twenty20. Mark Butcher, David Lawrence and Dean Headley all represented England, making contributions to the side.

=== Television and film ===
An investigation by the IOM in 2007 found that 67% of British Jamaican respondents reported watching television on a daily basis, 10% had no particular preference as to what channels they watched. 31% of respondents favoured the original terrestrial commercial channels such as ITV1, Channel 4 and Five, whilst 23% of people stated a preference to satellite and cable channels such as MTV Base, the Hallmark Channel and Living. There are a number of TV channels in the UK aimed at the Black British community, however none specifically at the British Jamaican community. The same IOM investigation found that minimal numbers of British Jamaicans actually watch these black-orientated channels, this is thought to be down to a heavy focus on Black African culture and issues (as opposed to Afro-Caribbean).

In terms of actual members of the British Jamaican community, a number of individuals have found fame in television and film in the UK. One of the biggest British Jamaican television personalities is Ainsley Harriott, who has appeared in several shows including Ready Steady Cook, Can't Cook, Won't Cook, City Hospital, Red Dwarf and Strictly Come Dancing. In September 2008, Harriott explored his Jamaican heritage, taking part in the genealogy documentary series, Who Do You Think You Are? Lenny Henry is another prominent name, co-founding the charity Comic Relief and appearing in TV programmes such as Broadchurch and Dr Who. Long-running British soap operas such as EastEnders, Coronation Street and Emmerdale have all had British Jamaican actors including Zaraah Abrahams, Tameka Empson, Angela Wynter, Stephen Graham and Jurrell Carter. Away from soap operas, other notable actors include Malachi Kirby, who earned a BAFTA for his role in Steve McQueen's highly acclaimed Small Axe, Michael Ward who won the 2019 BAFTA Rising Star Award, Colin Salmon and Ashley Walters, whose role in Bullet Boy earned him a British Independent Film Award for Breakthrough Performance.

Numerous British Jamaican actors have become successful in US film and television. Antonia Thomas is famed for her role as Dr. Claire Browne in the award-winning drama series The Good Doctor. Manchester-born Marsha Thomason is noted for her roles in the US shows Las Vegas and Lost, whilst Oxfordshire-born Wentworth Miller of Prison Break fame is also of partial Jamaican descent. Miller earned a Golden Globe Award nomination for his Prison Break role and won a Saturn Award for his guest appearance in the critically acclaimed The Flash. Stephen Graham featured in three Martin Scorsese productions and won two Screen Actors Guild Awards as part of the cast of the much lauded Boardwalk Empire. Delroy Lindo earned a Satellite Award for his role in American docudrama television film Glory & Honor. Lindo also won numerous accolades for his role as Paul, in Spike Lee's highly praised Da 5 Bloods.

Some British Jamaicans who have starred in Hollywood blockbusters include Naomie Harris in Miami Vice and Pirates of the Caribbean. She also starred in the critically acclaimed film Moonlight, a performance that earned her a number of accolades, including nominations for the Golden Globe, BAFTA, and Academy Award for Best Supporting Actress. Adrian Lester appeared in The Day After Tomorrow and the political blockbuster Primary Colors, directed by Mike Nicholls and co-starring John Travolta, Kathy Bates, Billy Bob Thornton and Emma Thompson. The role earned Lester a Chicago Film Critics Association award nomination for "Most Promising Actor". Lashana Lynch featured opposite Brie Larson in 2019's Captain Marvel and played the role of Nomi, the secret agent who replaces Craig's retired Bond in No Time to Die. Lynch won a BAFTA for her role in No Time to Die, thanking her Jamaican parents while accepting the award. The James Bond series and Jamaica are inextricably linked. British author Ian Fleming, creator of the super spy, resided at GoldenEye for many years, where he wrote all his James Bond novels. The first Bond film Dr No (1962), and Live And Let Die (1973) were both shot mainly in Kingston, Jamaica.

=== Notable people ===
See Main article: List of Jamaican British people

Notable trailblazers:

- Diane Abbott - Britain's first black female Member of Parliament, the first black female Shadow Home Secretary and the longest-serving black MP in the House of Commons
- Sislin Fay Allen - Britain's first black woman police constable
- Kehinde Andrews - Professor of Black Studies at Birmingham City University. He is the first black studies professor in the UK and led the establishment of the first black studies programme in Europe at Birmingham City
- Barbara Blake-Hannah - Author and journalist. British television's first black on-camera reporter and interviewer
- Aggrey Burke - Psychiatrist and academic. Britain's first black consultant psychiatrist, appointed by the National Health Service
- Dawn Butler - Member of Parliament and the first black female to speak from the despatch box in the House of Commons
- Betty Campbell - Community activist and Wales' first black head-teacher
- Naomi Campbell - Supermodel, the first black model to appear on the front cover of Time, French Vogue, Russian Vogue and the September issue of American Vogue
- Candice Carty-Williams - Writer, the first black female to win the British Book Awards "Book of the Year" accolade.
- Nira Chamberlain - President of the Institute of Mathematics and its Application. The first black mathematician to feature in the biographical reference book Who's Who
- William Robinson Clarke - World War I airman and Britain's first black pilot
- Joe Clough - London's first black Bus driver
- Yvonne Conolly - Britain's first black female headteacher
- Garth Crooks - Footballer, pundit and the first black chairman of the Professional Footballers' Association
- Dyke, Dryden and Wade - Britain's first black multi-million-pound business enterprise
- Michael Fuller - Former Her Majesty's Chief Inspector of the Crown Prosecution Service and former Chief Constable of Kent Police. He was the first (and so far only) ethnic minority chief constable in the United Kingdom
- Henry Gunter - Civil rights leader and the first black delegate to be elected to Birmingham Trades Council
- Paulette Hamilton - District nurse and manager for the Royal College of Nursing. Birmingham's first black Member of Parliament
- Rev Rose Hudson-Wilkin - The Church of England's first black female bishop. Also the first woman and the first black person to serve as Chaplain to the Speaker of the House of Commons
- Eric Irons - Equal rights campaigner and Britain's first black magistrate
- Wilston Samuel Jackson - Fireman and Britain's first black train driver
- Neil Kenlock - Co-founder of Choice FM, the UK's first and only licensed, independent black music radio station. Co-founder of the first black British glossy magazine, Root
- Sam Beaver King - Campaigner and Southwark's first black Mayor
- Les Ballets Nègres - Europe's first black dance company, founded in 1946
- Una Marson - Writer, the first black female radio producer at the BBC
- Caroline Newman - Best selling author and lawyer, the first black solicitor to be elected to the Council of the Law Society of England and Wales
- Bill Morris - Britain's first black trade union General Secretary
- Geoff Palmer - Scientist and inventor of the Barley Abrasion Process. Scotland's' first black university professor
- Jimmy Peters - Rugby player, England's first black rugby union international
- Heather Rabbatts - Solicitor, businesswoman and broadcaster. The first female and ethnic minority person to serve as a Football Association director
- Marvin Rees - Britain's first directly elected black Mayor
- Jason Robinson - Rugby international, the first black captain of the England national rugby union team. Also the first former professional rugby league player to captain the England rugby union team
- Tessa Sanderson - Athlete, the first and only British woman to win gold at an Olympic throwing event, and the first black British woman ever to win Olympic gold
- Mary Seacole - Nurse and businesswoman, voted number one in the list of 100 Great Black Britons
- Alex Scott - Sports presenter, pundit and footballer. The first female football pundit at a World Cup for the BBC, the first female pundit on Sky Sports Super Sunday, and the first female to be a permanent presenter of Football Focus
- Ethel Scott - Athlete, the first black woman to represent Great Britain in an international athletics competition
- Clive Sullivan - Rugby league player, the first black captain for a Great Britain team, in any sport
- Dame Sharon White - Businesswoman, the first black person, and the second woman, to become a Permanent Secretary at the HM Treasury
- James (Jim) Alexander Williams - Bristol's first (ceremonial) black Lord Mayor

== See also ==
- Black British
- Black British population
- British Mixed
- British Indo-Caribbean community
- British African-Caribbean community
- Classification of ethnicity in the United Kingdom
- Jamaicans of African ancestry
- List of Jamaican British people
