= Leonard Salzedo =

English composer and conductor

Leonard Salzedo (24 September 1921 – 6 May 2000) was an English composer and conductor of Spanish descent. He composed over 160 works, including 18 film scores, 17 ballets, ten string quartets and two symphonies.

== Life ==
Salzedo was born in Stamford Hill, East London, the son of an amateur musician of Spanish Jewish ancestry. He began playing violin aged six and started composing at the age of 13. After some early lessons from William Lloyd Webber he went on to study composition under Herbert Howells and violin under Isolde Menges at the Royal College of Music in London. Other teachers included Gordon Jacob (orchestration) and George Dyson (conducting).

His first acknowledged score was the String Quartet No 1 of 1942, op 1. On leaving the college in 1944 Salzedo immediately became a freelance composer, supplementing his earnings by playing violin with the London Philharmonic Orchestra and (from 1950 until 1966) the Royal Philharmonic. While at the RPO Salzedo was conductor's assistant for Sir Thomas Beecham.

Salzedo was musical director of the Ballet Rambert from 1967 until 1972, principal conductor with the Scottish Ballet from 1972 until 1974, and musical director of the City Ballet of London from 1982 until 1986, where he made many arrangements of classic ballet scores for the company's smaller orchestra. After 1986 he devoted himself to full-time composition.

In 1945 Salzedo married the dancer Pat Clover. He died at his home in Leighton Buzzard, Bedfordshire, aged 78. His daughters Caroline and Sue have set up The Leonard Salzedo Society to promote performances of his music. A centenary celebration concert was held at Conway Hall in London on 24 September 2022.

== Ballet music ==
Salzedo worked closely with the Ballet Rambert, which commissioned his first ballet, The Fugitive, in 1944. There were over 400 performances over the following six years. Along with his dancer wife Pat Clover he was closely involved with Les Ballets Nègres, a mostly black dance group founded in 1946 by Berto Pasuka and Richie Riley. He wrote four scores for the group for piano, tom tom and maracas: De Prophet, They Came, Market Day and Aggrey.

His most successful ballet was The Witch Boy, based on the ‘Ballad of Barbara Allan’, choreographed by Jack Carter and premiered by the Ballet der Lage Landen in Amsterdam in May 1956. It received over 1,000 performance in 30 different countries, and also became popular as a concert suite. A performance of Scenes and Dances: The Witch Boy (with slightly more music than the concert suite) was conducted by Beecham at the Royal Festival Hall on 14 November 1958. In August 2026 a recording of that live performance was issued by SOMM. Four of his ballet scores were choreographed by Norman Morrice: The Travellers (1963), The Realms of Choice (1965), Hazard (1967) and The Empty Suit (1970).

== Concert works ==
His first work for full orchestra, the overture Bosworth Field (1951) was followed by the symphonic poem Gabble Retchit (The Harlething) and the Two Rhythmic Pieces in 1952. Then came the Symphony No 1, premiered four years after its composition on 10 May 1956 at the Royal Festival Hall with Thomas Beecham conducting the Royal Philharmonic Orchestra. Paul Conway detects a Spanish influence in the final movement, "at times recalling de Falla and the Ravel of Rhapsodie Espagnole". The Symphony No 2 also has a Spanish flavour. It was composed in 1954 but had to wait until 1977 for its first performance, at the Edinburgh International Festival.

Other orchestral works include the Sinfonietta for chamber orchestra and an orchestral Suite from his Mardi Gras ballet of 1946. There are also a later series of concertos: the Divertimento Concertante for three clarinets and orchestra (1958), the Percussion Concerto (1968), the Viola Concerto scored for percussion, harp and strings (1983), the Violin Concerto (1992), and the Piano Concerto written for Leslie Howard in 1994.

After 1986 he had more time to work on larger scale pieces such as the hour-long Requiem Sine Voxibus ("Requiem Without Voices") for large orchestra (1989, so far unperformed), and the Stabat Mater for soprano, alto, chorus and orchestra (1991). Chamber music was also an important part of his output, including ten string quartets spanning his whole career - from No 1 in 1942 to No 10 (op 140) dating from 1997. There are also many works for various combinations of brass, strings and percussion, such as the six movement Partita for vibraphone, marimba, tuned gongs, timpani and string quartet (1990).

== Film and television ==
Salzedo also wrote many film scores, including several for Hammer Films, amongst them the war movie The Steel Bayonet (1957) and the horror film The Revenge of Frankenstein (1958). And his music became widely used as production music for television and radio. The fanfare which forms the first six bars of Salzedo's Divertimento for three trumpets and three trombones, opus 49 (1959), was used as the theme tune for the Open University's educational programmes on BBC television and radio from the 1970s to the 1990s. Another of his tunes, Guadalajara, was used by the BBC to accompany their "pie chart" schools' presentation during the 1960s and early 1970s, up until 1973.

== Orchestrations for Thomas Beecham ==
Beecham's widow Shirley claimed that Salzedo orchestrated the 1959 recording of Handel's Messiah for modern full orchestra, usually credited to Sir Eugene Goossens. Beecham had supposedly become impatient with Goossens's slow writing pace and was not happy with the quality of his work. Salzedo did assist Beecham with his re-orchestration of Grétry's Zémire et Azor
