= Wendy Shaia =

Author, clinical associate professor, and executive director

- Citizenship: British Jamaican
- Education: University of Maryland Baltimore
- Known for: The Black Cell and the SHARP framework
- Scientific career
- Fields: Clinical associate professor
- Workplaces: University of Maryland School of Social Work
- Website: https://www.wendyshaia.com

Wendy Shaia is a British–Jamaican author, clinical associate professor at the University of Maryland School of Social work, and executive director of the Social Work Community Outreach Service (SWCOS).

== Education ==
Shaia graduated from the University of Maryland School of Social Work. She earned a Doctor of Education in Human and Organizational Learning from The George Washington University.

== SHARP framework ==
The SHARP framework is a tool used to assess and understand the psychological sufferings resulting from oppressive factors, creating awareness and motivating anti-oppressive shifts. Shaia developed the framework while researching ways to address the context of poverty and oppression during service provision in the United States. She anchored the framework tool on five components, from which it derives its name: structural oppression, historical context, analysis of role, reciprocity and mutuality, and power.

== Books published ==
- The Black Cell, a finalist in the urban fiction category of the 2022 American book fiction awards
- Linking Health and Education for African American Students' Success – "Chapter 6. Schools as Re-Traumatizing Environments"

== Short stories published ==
- "Waiting for Something"
- "The Red Summer"

== Journal articles published ==
Title	Year of publication, journal
"Socially-Engineered Trauma and a New Social Work Pedagogy: Socioeducation as a Critical Foundation of Social Work Practice"	2019, Smith College Studies in Social Work
"SHARP: A framework for addressing the contexts of poverty and oppression during service provision in the US"	2019, Journal of Social Work Values and Ethics
"We had to keep pushing: Black caregivers' perspectives on autism screening and referral practices in primary care"	2018, Intellectual and Developmental Disabilities
"Moving from survival to fulfillment: A planning framework for community schools"	2018, Phi Delta Kappan
"School social workers as partners in the school mission"	2018, Phi Delta Kappan
"Book review: Why Are They Angry With Us? Essays on Race, by Larry E Davis"	2016, Qualitative Social Work
"Macro MI: Using Motivational Interviewing to Address Socially-engineered Trauma"	2022, Journal of Progressive Human Services
"Experiences of Personal and Vicarious Victimization for Black Adults with Serious Mental Illnesses: Implications for Treating Socially-engineered Trauma"	2022, Smith College Studies in Social Work
"Participation of Black and African-American Families in Autism Research"	2020, Journal of Autism and Developmental Disorders
"'I am so fearful for him': a mixed-methods exploration of stress among caregivers of Black children with autism"	2022, Journal of Developmental Disabilities
