= Berto Pasuka =

English ballet (1939–1963)

Berto Pasuka (1911–1963) was a dancer and choreographer of Jamaican heritage.

Born as Wilbert Passerley in Jamaica, Pasuka studied classical ballet in Kingston. He moved to London in 1939 and enrolled at the Astafieva Dance School for further training in choreography.

Pasuka's breakthrough came when he was asked to dance for the 1946 film Men of Two Worlds and to help recruit other dancers. This experience prompted him to start his own dance company, Les Ballets Nègres, with fellow Jamaican dancer Richie Riley. The troupe was notable for bringing traditional and contemporary black dance to the UK and Europe with sell-out tours. Other members included the dancers John Lagey and Elroy Josephs and the Nigerian musicians Bobby Benson and Ambrose Campbell.

After the closure of the company in 1953 Pasuka continued to dance, and was photographed by Angus McBean. His last stage appearance was in 1959 at the Royal Court Theatre in Sean O'Casey's Cock-a-Doodle Dandy (dancing as the cockerel of the title). In April 1963 he was found ill in his Paris apartment and died at a hospital in Wimbledon.
