= Brewster Hughes =

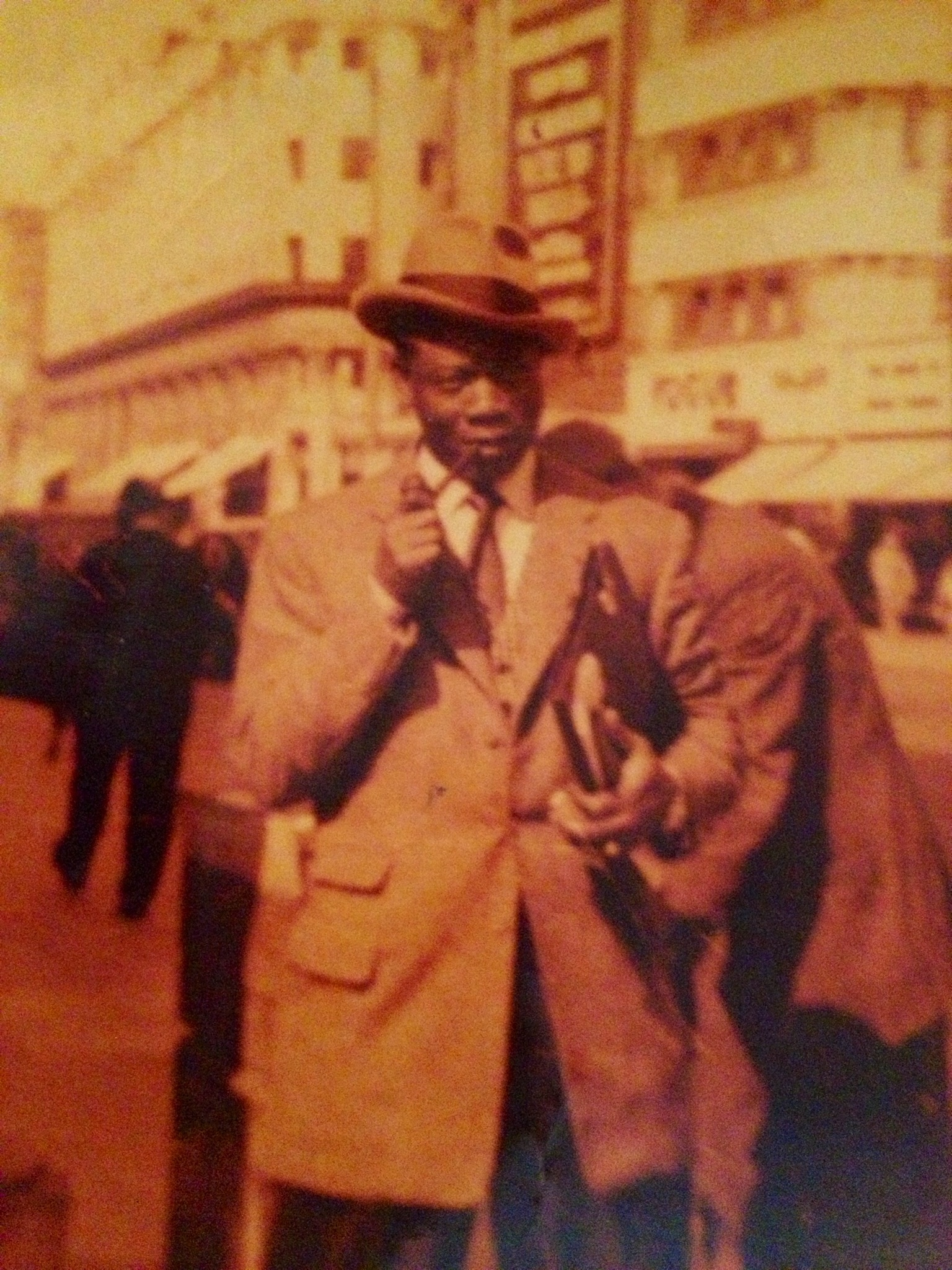

Background information
- Birth name: Ignatius Abiodun Oke
- Also known as: Ernest Henley Oke Hughes
- Born: 12 December 1912; Ibadan, Nigeria
- Died: 30 September 1986 (aged 73); London, England
- Genres: Yoruba music, palm-wine, jùjú, highlife
- Occupation(s): Bandleader, guitarist
- Instrument: Guitar
- Years active: 1930s–1980s
- Labels: Melodisc
- Formerly of: Ambrose Campbell

Brewster Hughes (12 December 1912 – 30 September 1986), born Ignatius Abiodun Oke and who later used the name Ernest Henley Oke Hughes, was a Nigerian guitarist, bandleader and community leader who was active in Britain as a highlife performer and recording artist after the Second World War.

== Biography ==
Abiodun Oke was born in Ibadan, Nigeria, into a Yoruba family. He moved with his mother to Lagos and then to Port Harcourt, where he lived with his maternal grandfather, David Ayodele Hughes, the superintendent of the United Native African Church mission. He studied at the Hope Waddell Training Institute in Calabar before returning to Ibadan where he trained as a schoolteacher. He then worked in Lagos, and, after his mother's death, adopted her family name of Hughes. He began playing guitar in Lagos bars in the evenings, meeting fellow musician Ambrose Campbell and performing with him in the Jolly Boys Orchestra (or Jolly Orchestra).

In 1939 he left Nigeria and joined the British Merchant Navy as a stoker, using the name Ernest Henley Hughes and acquiring the nickname "Brewster". He settled in Manchester and worked as a fitter in an aircraft factory before moving to London, where he met up again with Ambrose Campbell. When Campbell was assaulted by racist thugs at a London Underground station, Hughes shot one of the assailants, and was imprisoned for 15 months as a result. After his release in 1946, he and Campbell, with other musicians, formed a band, the West African Rhythm Brothers, initially to accompany a ballet company, Les Ballets Nègres, who toured the UK. The group established a residency at the Abalabi club in Soho in 1952, playing a mixture of palm-wine and jùjú music but increasingly absorbing calypso and mento influences from musicians newly arriving from the Caribbean. With Campbell on vocals and Hughes on guitar, other members of the group included trumpeter Harry Beckett, saxophonist Willy Roachford, pianist Adam Fiberesima, and bongo player Ade Bashorun. According to writer Val Wilmer:

While Campbell was credited as the group's leader, Hughes's role was important. He played an amplified instrument, sometimes in a harsh, attacking style, and his confident, boisterous singing made a welcome contrast to Campbell's gentler, more diffident manner. As a more than competent guitarist with an affinity to jazz, he often provided the group's musical impetus and direction, and as the Nigerian highlife made inroads into the consciousness of Londoners in the early 1950s Hughes acted as spokesman for the group, spelling out their philosophy and aims.

After Campbell began playing guitar in the mid-1950s, Hughes felt marginalised and left to form his own band, the International Rhythm Band, also known as the Nigeria Union Rhythm Group. Hughes recorded music for advertising and films, before rejoining Campbell for a tour of Nigeria in 1957. He later replaced Campbell as resident bandleader at the Club Afrique, successor to the Abalabi, and recorded an album, Highlife from Nigeria, for Melodisc Records in the late 1960s, with his group credited as Brewster Hughes and His Highlifers.

As a leader of the Yoruba community in London, Hughes helped organise events to welcome visiting politicians and elders, and acted on behalf of community members on immigration matters, drawing on the contacts with senior British politicians that he had made when a club performer in the 1950s. He regularly performed with his group at annual dances for such bodies as The Law Society, as well as at student dances in London. He visited Nigeria in 1985, where he was treated as a celebrity.

== Personal life and death ==
Hughes lived with Elizabeth (Betty) Ogle in Manchester. They later separated, and he then formed a relationship with Thelma Clarke; they married in 1966 and had three children before divorcing. In 1974 he married Patricia Smith; they also had three children.

He died from lung cancer in London in 1986. His ashes were taken to Nigeria and buried in his mother's grave.
