= Elroy Josephs =

Jamaican dancer (1939–1997)

- Josephs in Quatermass and the Pit
- Born: Roy George Elroy Josephs; 23 February 1939; Jamaica
- Died: 8 February 1997 (aged 57); Camden, London, England
- Other name: Elroy Josephz
- Occupations: Actor, dancer, teacher
- Years active: 1950–1997

Elroy Josephs (23 February 1939 (Note: This may not necessarily be his birth year. According to his friend Bill Harpe in ch. 16 ("Elroy Josephs and the Hidden History of Black British Dance") of The Routledge Companion to Dance Studies (also Reference No. 7), "when [Josephs] was taking up employment as a lecturer at IM Marsh College in Liverpool (now John Moores University) he cut some ten years (I don't know the exact figure) from his age in order to fit in with expectations/retirement age, etc.") – 8 February 1997) was a Jamaican actor and dancer who became the first black dance teacher at a British University. His style of dance fused African-Caribbean with those of Europe and Asia.

== Dancing ==
Coming to England as a youth in 1950, Josephs began his career as a professional dancer with Les Ballets Nègres. He studied many forms of dances with various renowned teachers in the field: Indian with Ram Gopal, Spanish with Elsa Brunelleschi and Caribbean and African with Ben Johnson and Obie Shelankey. He set up a company during the sixties called Elroy Josephz Productions, which performed in cabarets in Madrid.

== Acting ==
Along the way, Josephs made a career, performing on stage and having an acting career on television. He was one of the first black dancers to appear in West Side Story in the West End. On TV, he featured in ITV Play of the Week, Sunday Night Theatre, Dixon of Dock Green, Doctor Who (Season 4 premiere The Smugglers), Adam Adamant Lives!, The Wednesday Play, Theatre 625, Love Thy Neighbour, Stage 2 and Brideshead Revisited. On film, he was credited in The Alf Garnett Saga but went uncredited in Hammer Film's Quatermass and the Pit (1967).

In the early 1970s, Josephs started a community dance project in Camden called Workshop No. 7 and was appointed as one of the Greater London Arts Association's (GLAA) first dance animateurs.

Central to the dancer's work was his understanding of the historical importance of transatlantic slavery and its legacies. During 1973-75, he was Chairman of the Dance Committee and dance specialist for the British zone of the Second World Black and African Festival of Arts and culture in Lagos. Afterwards, he worked with the Commission for Racial Equality and Equity, supporting artists and students who were confronted by discrimination.

In 1979, Josephs left his dance project in the hands of Carl Campbell (who developed it into Dance Company 7) when he was appointed dance lecturer at I.M. Teacher Training College in Liverpool. In 1993, he chaired an event in Manchester called "What is Black Dance in Britain?"

Elroy was an inspiration and influence to the students he taught in London and Liverpool. Since his death, his legacy has lived on through former colleagues and students.

== Tributes ==
In November 1997, a bench and plaque was unveiled in Elroy's memory at John Moores University. As part of Black History Month in October 2012, the International Slavery Museum and Enterprise South Liverpool Academy staged a tribute show in the lecturer's memory, to spotlight his often overlooked influence on black dance culture. Over 2013-2014, the Slavery museum held an exhibition called British Dance: Black Routes which featured Josephs' relatively untold story and a display dedicated to the dancer.
