= Arthur Torrington =

Guyanese-born community advocate and historian

Arthur Torrington CBE
- Born: British Guiana
- Occupations: Community advocate and historian
- Known for: Co-founder of the Windrush Foundation and of the Equiano Society

Arthur Torrington CBE is a Guyanese-born community advocate and historian who is Director and co-founder of the London-based Windrush Foundation, a charity that since 1996 has been working to highlight the contributions to the UK of African and Caribbean peoples, "to keep alive the memories of the young men and women who were among the first wave of post-war settlers in Britain", and to promote good community relations. The organization commemorates in its name the Empire Windrush, the ship that on 22 June 1948 docked at Tilbury bringing the first significant group of Caribbean migrants to Britain, including Sam King, who with Torrington established the Windrush Foundation.

Also in 1996, Torrington set up the Equiano Society, with the main objective of celebrating the life and work of Olaudah Equiano (c. 1745–1797), as well as the literary and cultural legacy in Britain of Equiano's African contemporaries.

== Biography ==
Born in British Guiana (modern-day Guyana), Torrington attended St Ambrose Primary School and Tutorial High School, and went in Britain as a teenager in the 1960s.

Torrington joined forces with Sam King to establish the Windrush Foundation, in 1996, to ensure that the 50th anniversary of the arrival of the Empire Windrush would be appropriately marked and celebrated; as reported in the Guyana Chronicle: "Using their own resources, Arthur and Sam went around the country, gathering together as many people as possible, with stories of the Empire Windrush and what would come to be known as the 'Windrush Generation'. ... Their goal was to turn the 'Empire Windrush' into an iconic symbol, representing early Caribbean migrants and their contribution to the rebuilding of Britain after WWII. It worked and the 50th anniversary turned out to be a huge success, spawning books and TV and radio documentaries. Sam, who had sailed on the 'Empire Windrush', was among those who met Prince Charles at St James's Palace for an official ceremony to mark the occasion." In 2018, the Windrush Foundation led the project "Windrush70" to mark the 70th anniversary of the arrival of the Empire Windrush.

Torrington also co-founded in London in 1996 a community organisation named the Equiano Society, to publicise the achievements of Olaudah Equiano and his 18th-century African contemporaries, including such figures as Ignatius Sancho and Ottobah Cugoano, who made outstanding contributions to African and European literature.

In 2014, Torrington curated the touring exhibition Making Freedom, which opened at the Black Cultural Archives, marking full Emancipation in the Caribbean that took place on 1 August 1868.

Torrington is c0-author with Bill Hern of the book Windrush: Dispelling Myths & Misconceptions.

== Awards ==
Torrington was appointed an Officer of the Order of the British Empire (OBE) in 2002 for services to Community Relations in London, and a Commander of the Order of the British Empire (CBE) in 2011, for services to Black British heritage.

In 2018, Torrington received from the Guyana High Commission in London the "Windrush Lifetime Service" Award, for his "tireless work to raise awareness of the contribution of the Windrush generation ... a lasting gift to current and future generations".
