= A Man's a Man (book) =

1954 UK Communist leaflet on racism's effects

- Author: Henry Gunter
- Genres: Racism
- Publisher: Communist Party of Britain
- Publication date: 1954
- Publication place: United Kingdom
- Pages: 14

A Man's a Man: A Study of Colour Bar in Birmingham (1954) is a political leaflet published by the Communist Party of Great Britain (CPGB) in 1954. It was written by black civil rights leader and communist activist Henry Gunter, who would later lead a successful campaign to desegregate buses in the English city of Birmingham. The leaflet discussed social and economic issues facing black people in Britain including unemployment, hotels, housing, and social activities.

== Importance ==
The leaflet has been described by historians as an important piece of literature in the history of black people in Britain. Historian Tia Hortin describes the leaflet as "a landmark piece of anti-racist literature." The cover of the leaflet was later used in Black History Month promotional materials by Birmingham City Council.

Research materials relating to Henry Gunter, along with a rare surviving copy of A Man's a Man, can be found in the Library of Birmingham's Wolfson Center for Archival Research.

== See also ==
- Caribbean News
- West Indian Gazette
