= Anne Brodbelt =

(1751–1827), British Jamaican letter writer and social observer

- Born: Anne Penoyre; 1 January 1751; Spanish Town, Colony of Jamaica
- Died: 6 September 1827 (aged 76); Bath, Somerset, England
- Spouse: Francis Rigby Brodbelt
- Children: Francis Rigby Brodbelt Stallard Penoyre
- Writing career
- Genre: Letter writing

Anne Brodbelt née Anne Penoyre (1 January 1751 – 6 September 1827) was a British – Jamaican letter writer and social observer.

== Life ==
Brodbelt was born in Spanish Town, Colony of Jamaica, into a family long established there, and she married a physician named Francis Rigby Brodbelt, also of a West Indian family who served as doctors, members of the assembly or judiciary, or as soldiers for many generations in the colonial West Indies. Both the Penoyres and Brodbelts owned plantations in Jamaica.

She is known today because she wrote long descriptive letters to her children who were being educated in England, away from the slave-owning plantocracy in the West Indies. They describe her life and local events. Her husband died in 1795 and a memorial by John Bacon was made for him. Brodbelt relocated to Bath, where she died in 1827.

== Legacy ==
Her letters were passed down the family, and they were finally published in 1938 by Geraldine Mozley who was her great-great-granddaughter. Also a member of council and a medical doctor, her son Francis was left property in Jamaica, landed estates in England, property in the City of London, and £120,000, by a number of benefactors including Anne's relative, Thomas Stallard Penoyre of the Moor, a merchant and apothecary of London and a member of the land-owning gentry of Herefordshire. As a condition of the Penoyre inheritance, Francis changed his name in 1824 to Francis Rigby Brodbelt Stallard Penoyre, and he relocated to Herefordshire, London, and Bath.
