= Vivian Virtue =

Jamaican poet (1911–1998)

Vivian Lancaster Virtue FRSA FRSL (13 November 1911 – 17 December 1998) was a Jamaican poet, translator and broadcaster who moved to England in 1960.

== Life and career ==
Virtue was born in KingstonJamaica, was educated there and was employed by the Jamaican Department of Public Works. On his retirement from the civil service in 1960, he moved to London.

He served as the assistant secretary, librarian and later vice-president of the Poetry League of Jamaica. He was a founding member and vice-president of the Jamaican Center of PEN International. He was also a member of the British Royal Society of Literature and a fellow of the Royal Society of Arts.

Virtue translated poetry by José-Maria de Heredia from French into English as well as poems in Spanish by other Caribbean and Latin American poets.

He received the Silver Musgrave Medal from the Institute of Jamaica in 1960. On the occasion of the Commonwealth Arts Festival in 1965, he was commissioned to write a poem in honour of Marcus Garvey. His work appeared in various journals, anthologies and the collection Wings of the Morning (1938). He frequently appeared on the BBC's Caribbean Voices radio programme.

Virtue was married to Rhue Hope McKay, daughter of writer Claude McKay and his wife, the former Eulalie Imelda Lewars.

Virtue died in London in 1998 at the age of 87 after an extended illness from heart disease and bronchopneumonia.
