= Sam Beaver King =

Jamaican-British campaigner and community activist (1926–2016)

Sam Beaver King MBE

Mayor of Southwark
- In office 1983–1984
- Preceded by: M Geaton
- Succeeded by: James Greening

Southwark Councillor, Bellenden ward, Peckham
- In office 1982–?

Personal details
- Born: 20 February 1926 Portland, Jamaica
- Died: 17 June 2016 (aged 90) London, UK
- Party: Labour
- Occupation: Postal worker and community activist
- Awards: MBE
- Nickname: Mr Windrush
- Military career
- Allegiance: United Kingdom
- Branch: Royal Air Force
- Service years: 1944–1947; 1948–1953
- Conflicts: Second World War

Sam Beaver King MBE (20 February 1926 – 17 June 2016) was a Jamaican-British campaigner and community activist. He first came to England as an engineer in the Royal Air Force (RAF) during the Second World War but returned to Jamaica in 1947. Failing to settle there, King took passage to London in 1948, sailing on the Empire Windrush. He later became the first black mayor of Southwark and a campaigner in support of West Indian immigrants to the country.

== Early life and career ==
King was born at Priestman's River in Portland, Jamaica, on 20 February 1926. He was one of ten siblings in a strong Christian household and helped on the family's banana farm. In 1944, King responded to an advertisement in The Gleaner that called for volunteers to join the British Royal Air Force (RAF) to fight in the Second World War. After carrying out initial training in Kingston, he was posted to an RAF training centre at Filey in Yorkshire and thence to RAF Hawkinge, a fighter base near Folkestone, Kent, where he worked as an engineer. He was demobilised in 1947 and returned to Jamaica.

Back in Jamaica, King struggled to settle into civilian life, finding it difficult to get work, and it was another advertisement in The Gleaner – for tickets on the Empire Windrush – that saw him return to the UK.

== Migration to England ==
King disembarked at Tilbury Docks on 22 June 1948, on the Windrush′s now famous first journey, and rejoined the RAF. He left the armed forces in 1953 and settled in Southwark, where he found work as a postman, the start of a 34-year career with the Post Office.

King was heavily involved in London's West Indian community, including the 1959 Caribbean-style carnival first organised by Claudia Jones in St Pancras Town Hall in January 1959 that was a precursor of the Notting Hill Carnival. He also helped to found the West Indian Gazette, the first British newspaper written specifically for a black readership, and was its circulation manager in the mid-1950s. King served as a local councillor for six months before being elected mayor of the London Borough of Southwark in 1983. He was the first black mayor in the borough and was, at the time, the only black mayor in London.

King set up the Windrush Foundation, with Arthur Torrington, in 1996 to preserve the memories of those who arrived on that voyage and to campaign on behalf of West Indian immigrants. He campaigned for the date of the Windrush's arrival to be established as a public holiday to mark the contributions of immigrants to British society and became so closely associated with this cause that he was known as "Mr Windrush".

King was appointed a Member of the Order of the British Empire in 1998 as part of the 50th-anniversary celebrations of Windrush Day. That same year he published his autobiography, Climbing up the Rough Side of the Mountain. He is the subject of a 2023 ebook by Angela Cobbinah and Arthur Torrington, issued by the Windrush Foundation.

== Personal life ==
King was a lay preacher, having taken a ministerial course at Goldsmiths College. A lifelong advocate of socialism and cricket, he began to read the Daily Telegraph in 1948 because, despite having "no time for their politics or their editorials", he was captivated by the writing of that paper's cricket correspondent, E. W. Swanton. He recalled in a 2008 Guardian interview that "...the first time I read Swanton, he spoke of the smack of willow on leather, of the bowler holding a true line, of sunshine on the grass and pretty girls in summer frocks. That was a world I knew. Cricket is not a sport, it's a way of life,".

King fell ill in early 2016 and died on 17 June that year, aged 90. He had been twice married and had two children, three grandchildren and three great-grandchildren. Among those who paid tribute to him was Labour leader Jeremy Corbyn, who described King as "a legend": "He educated Londoners with Caribbean food, Caribbean culture, Caribbean music. London is a better place, Britain is a better place thanks to him and his family." His funeral took place at Southwark Cathedral on Tuesday, 19 July, attended by some 500 mourners representing family, friends, colleagues and dignitaries.

King was named on the 2020 list of 100 Great Black Britons.
