= Johnny Kwango =

English wrestler (1920–1994)

Personal information
- Born: John Lagey; 20 April 1920 England
- Died: 19 January 1994 (aged 73) Peckham, London, England

Professional wrestling career
- Ring name: Johnny Kwango
- Debut: Late 1940s
- Retired: 1980s

John Lagey (20 April 1920 – 19 January 1994), better known by his ring name Johnny Kwango, was an English ballet dancer, and later a professional wrestler. He was frequently seen on ITV's coverage of British wrestling. Lagey was a member of the all-black dance troupe Les Ballets Nègres, which was founded in 1946.

== Professional wrestling career ==
Kwango wrestled from the late 1940s to the 1980s, and was famous for his head-butt moves. He achieved fame in Britain through televised matches on ITV, but also enjoyed popularity in Europe, the Middle East, and Africa.
