= Ambrose Campbell =

Nigerian musician and bandleader (1919–2006)

- Campbell in January 2006.

Background information
- Born: Oladipupo Adekoya Campbell; 19 August 1919; Lagos, Nigeria
- Died: 22 June 2006 (aged 86) Plymouth, England
- Genres: Highlife, jùjú music, jazz, rock, etc.
- Occupations: Singer, bandleader, guitarist
- Instruments: Guitar, percussion
- Years active: 1946–1990s
- Labels: Melodisc, Columbia
- Formerly of: Les Ballets Nègres, Leon Russell, Willie Nelson, Ronnie Scott, Tubby Hayes and Phil Seamen.

Ambrose Campbell (19 August 1919 – 22 June 2006) was a Nigerian musician and bandleader. He is credited with forming Britain's first ever black band, the West African Rhythm Brothers, in the 1940s, and was also acknowledged by Fela Kuti as "the father of modern Nigerian music". Campbell worked with British jazz musicians in the 1950s, and later toured and recorded with Leon Russell in the US, where he lived for thirty years.

== Biography ==
He was born Oladipupo Adekoya Campbell in Lagos, Nigeria, into a Christian family; his father was a preacher. Campbell sang in the church choir, and also, nicknamed "Ambrose", started performing palm-wine music against the wishes of his family, who kicked him out of the house when they discovered what he was doing. For a while, he lived under the protection of nationalist leader Herbert Macaulay and worked as a printer, as well as a musician. He met guitarist Brewster Hughes in Lagos, and performed with him in the Jolly Boys Orchestra.

Soon after the start of World War II, Campbell joined the crew of an Elder Dempster cargo ship sailing to Britain. On its second voyage, the ship was attacked by U-boats in the Atlantic Ocean, and Campbell jumped ship in Liverpool, England, soon moving to London, where he came into contact with other members of the small Nigerian community, including Brewster Hughes, who had also moved to the capital city. Campbell formed a band, but soon afterwards he was attacked by racist thugs at a London Underground station; Hughes was later imprisoned for shooting one of the assailants. Campbell first came to public attention by performing with his band at the VE Day celebrations in Trafalgar Square and Piccadilly Circus in 1945. He said:

"People didn't know what was going on but they joined in. I suppose it was curiosity. Everybody had been waiting for that day so everybody was happy and jumping around and dancing and kissing each other, so we thought we'd join the celebration. We had a huge crowd following us around Piccadilly Circus. You could hardly move."

In 1946, Campbell and Brewster Hughes, after his release from prison, formed a professional band, the West African Rhythm Brothers. They were employed to provide music for theatre performances by the black ballet company, Les Ballets Nègres, and toured the UK. The group appeared on British television, and around 1952 established a residency at the Abalabi club in Soho, playing a mixture of palm-wine and jùjú music and associating with jazz musicians including Ronnie Scott, Tubby Hayes and Phil Seamen. Campbell and his band increasingly absorbed calypso and mento influences from musicians newly arriving from the Caribbean, some of whom joined the band, as well as group members' experiences of racism in Britain. With Campbell on vocals and Hughes on guitar, other members of the group included trumpeter Harry Beckett, saxophonist Willy Roachford, pianist Adam Fiberesima, and bongo player Ade Bashorun. In the 1950s Campbell recorded a series of 78 rpm records for the Melodisc label owned by Emil Shalit, and became a well-known figure in Soho. He appeared thinly disguised as the character "Cranium Cuthbertson" in Colin MacInnes's 1957 novel City of Spades; MacInnes became godfather to Campbell's first son.

In the 1960s, the Abalabi club moved and became the Club Afrique in Wardour Street. Campbell learned guitar and, after a disagreement with Brewster Hughes, formed a new band. Campbell toured Italy, and formed a production company with the help of lawyer and Labour Party adviser Arnold Goodman. Campbell recorded an album for Columbia, Highlife Today, in 1968, before seemingly vanishing; newspapers in Lagos reported his death. However, in fact he travelled to Los Angeles, California, in 1972 with record producer Denny Cordell, intending to start his own business in the United States. There he was introduced to keyboardist and record producer Leon Russell, who invited Campbell to tour with him. He recorded as a percussionist with Russell – who referred to Campbell as his "spiritual adviser" – and Willie Nelson on the album One for the Road. Campbell toured worldwide with Russell, before settling in Nashville, Tennessee, in 1982 and remarrying.

He returned to Britain in 2004, to live in Plymouth with his daughter and grandchildren. The following year, Honest Jon's Records included some of Campbell's Melodisc recordings on a compilation CD, London Is the Place for Me, Vol.3. Campbell died in Plymouth in 2006 at the age of 86.

== Collaborations ==
With Don Preston

- Been Here All The Time (Shelter Records, 1974)

With Leon Russell

- Will O' the Wisp (Shelter Records, 1975)
- Solid State (Paradise, 1984)

With Leon Russell and Mary McCreary

- Wedding Album (Paradise, 1976)
