= The Academy of St Nicholas =

The Academy Of St Nicholas
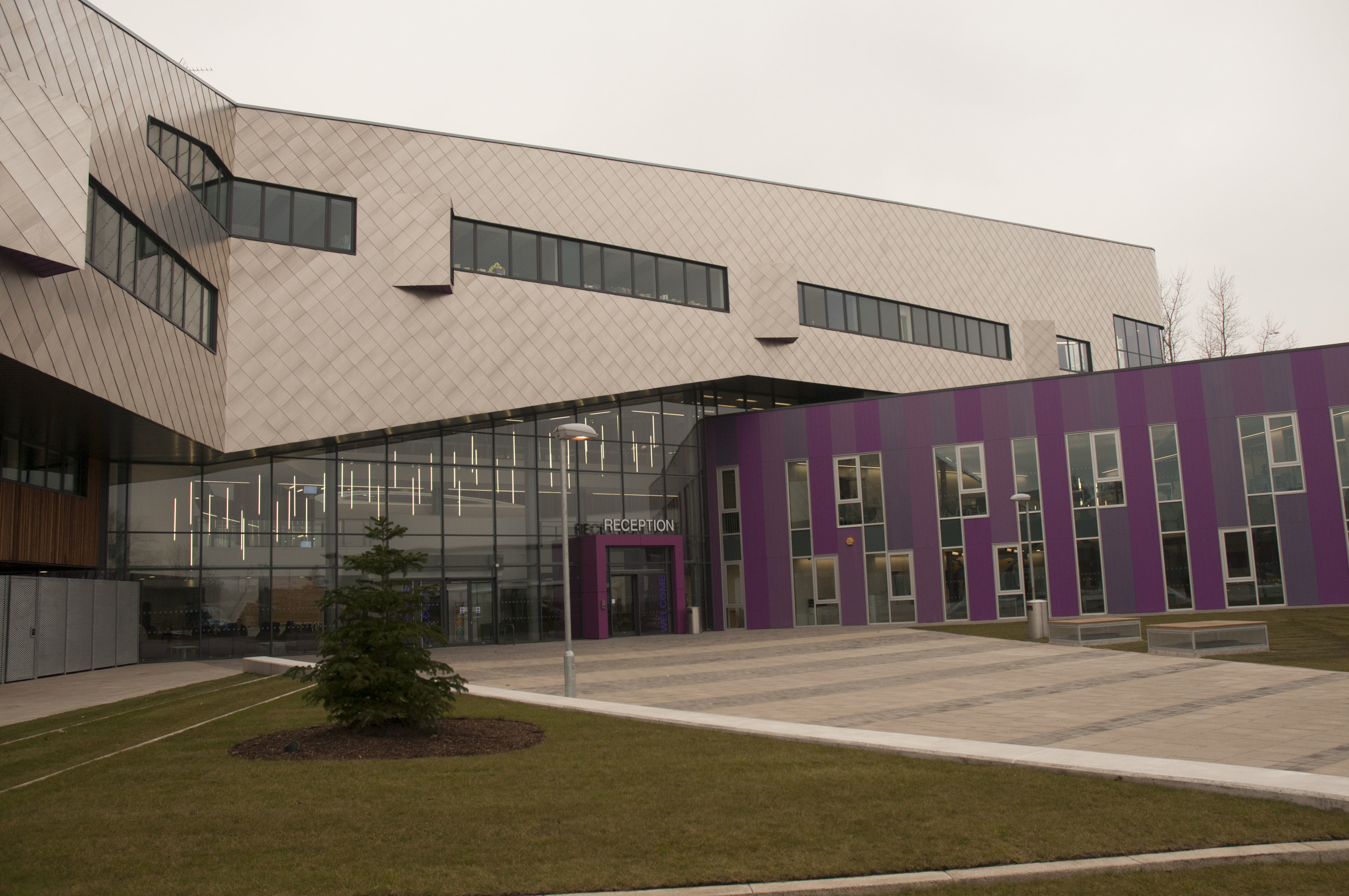

Location
- 51 Horrocks Avenue; Garston; Liverpool, Merseyside, L19 5NY; England
- Coordinates: 53.353446°N 2.890523°W

Information
- Type: Academy
- Religious affiliation: Roman Catholic/Church of England
- Established: February 2013
- Department for Education URN: 136119 Tables
- Ofsted: Reports
- Head teacher: G. Lloyd
- Gender: Coeducational
- Age: 11 to 19
- Enrolment: 787
- Colour
- Website: www.astn.uk

The Academy of St Nicholas, previously known as Enterprise South Liverpool Academy (ESLA), is a joint Roman Catholic and Church of England secondary school located in Garston, Liverpool, England. The school is co-educational from years 7 to 11 including the sixth form, All Saints Sixth Form College, for ages 16–19.

The school opened in a building costing £23.4m in February 2013. It is a mixed-faith school that accepts students of all faiths and none.

== Ofsted Reports ==
An Ofsted inspection in October 2012 found that ESLA “required improvement”, they then went into special measures in October 2014. The school received £1.2 million emergency funding in 2012 and in 2013/2014 - only £131,00 of which needs to be repaid.

In 2014 Parklands High School in Liverpool closed down and ESLA agreed to take some of the students in, while their Ofsted report was Inadequate.

In 2016, a number of sponsors of ESLA pulled away from the school including their main sponsor 'Enterprise' losing rights to the word in their school name. Since this time, ESLA/The Academy has risen back to the previous "requires improvement" score in Ofsted reporting.

== Branding ==
=== Logo ===
The school logo is an abstract depiction of a purple dove (purple being the school's signature colour) with five wings; the five wings represent the academy's five sponsors: Amey PLC, Liverpool City Council, the diocese of Liverpool and the archdiocese of Liverpool, and The University of Liverpool.

=== Name Change ===
From 2 February 2017 Enterprise South Liverpool Academy changed to The Academy of St Nicholas, due to the pullout their main sponsor 'Enterprise' and adding more students from The Academy of St Francis of Assisi creating All Saints Sixth Form College.
