= Nira Chamberlain =

British mathematician (born 1969)

Professor Nira Chamberlain OBE CMath
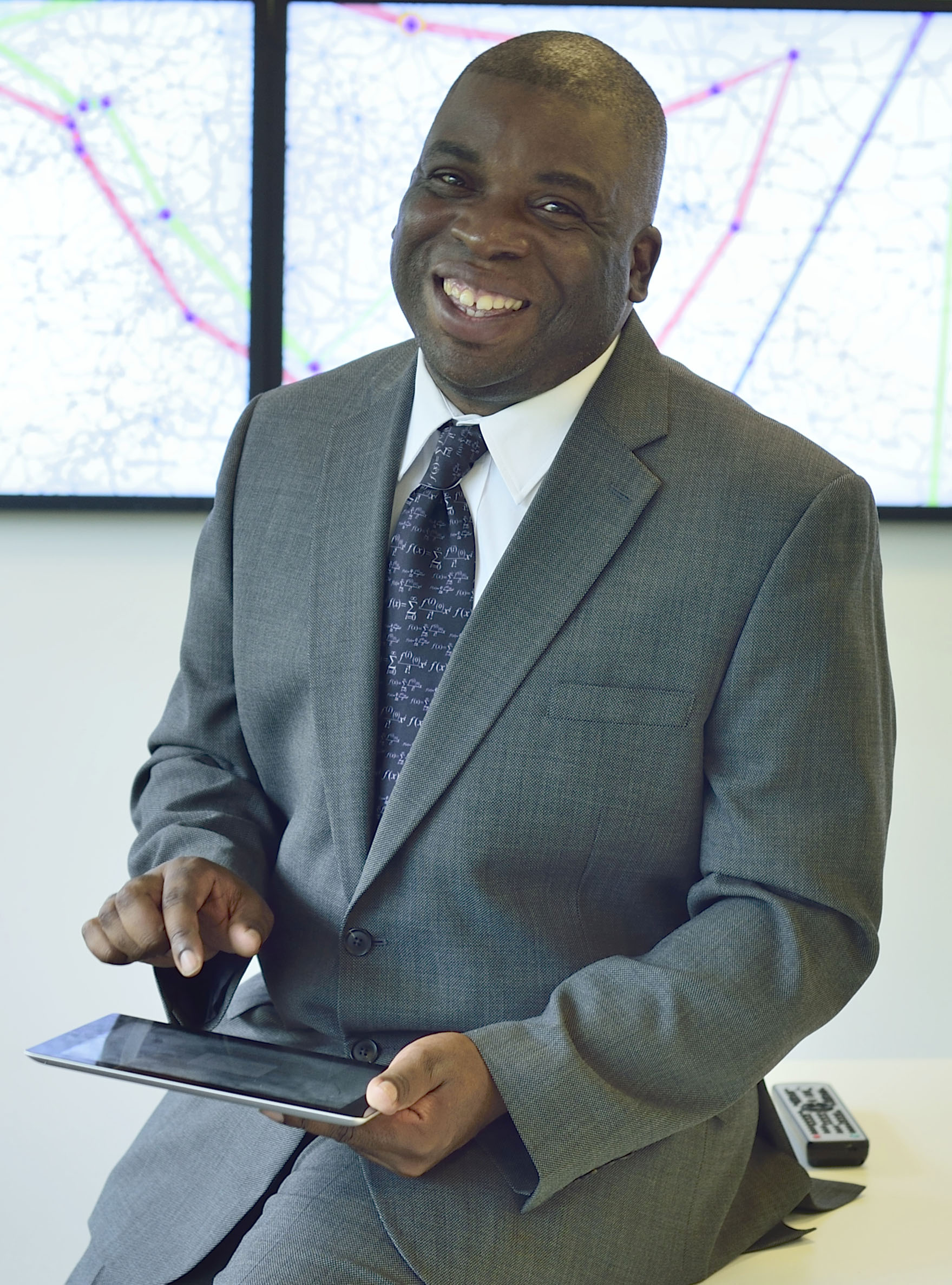
- Professor Chamberlain in 2015
- Born: June 17, 1969 (age 57); Birmingham, England
- Education: Loughborough University University of Portsmouth
- Occupation: Mathematician
- Employer: AtkinsRéalis
- Website: www.nirachamberlainobe.com

Nira Cyril Chamberlain OBE CMath (born 17 June 1969) is a British mathematician based in Birmingham, UK. He is a principal consultant at AtkinsRéalis.

== Early life and education ==
Born in Birmingham, Chamberlain always enjoyed mathematics at school and, despite a lack of encouragement from his teachers, completed a course of study leading to a BSc in Mathematics at Coventry Polytechnic, graduating in 1991. He then moved to Loughborough University, where he achieved an MSc in Industrial Mathematical Modelling in 1993. In 2014, he completed a PhD at Portsmouth University, under the supervision of Professor Andrew Osbaldestin entitled "Extension of the gambler's ruin problem played over networks".

== Research and career ==
Chamberlain has worked all over the world, helping a range of industrial partners with mathematical modelling. He created a mathematical cost capability trade-off for HMS Queen Elizabeth, modelling the lifetime running costs of aircraft carriers versus operating budgets. This use of mathematics in the real world was cited in the Encyclopedia of Mathematics and Society.

In 2012, Chamberlain was involved with the UK STEM Project "Being a Professional Mathematician", where his interview was selected for an iTunes podcast. In 2014 he was named by the Science Council as one of the UK's top scientists. Only five mathematicians were selected for this accolade.

He is currently a member of the Institute of Mathematics and its Applications (IMA), European Mathematical Society, Operational Research Society and London Mathematical Society. He was appointed President of the IMA for the 2020–2022 term.

Chamberlain became the first Black mathematician to join the exclusive list of living British mathematicians to feature in the biographical reference book Who’s Who. Established in 1849, the book contains information on more than 33,000 influential people from around the world.

Chamberlain regularly gives public lectures, discussing the significance of mathematics in human achievements and debating its relevance in everyday life. In 2016 he ran a one-day workshop at the London International Youth Science Forum, Imperial College London. He was a keynote speaker at the 2017 New Scientist workshop "The Mathematical World". In 2018 he was awarded the title of "World's Most Interesting Mathematician" from the Big Internet Math Off run by the Aperiodical website. In 2019, he gave a Maxwell Lecture at Maxwell Society titled "The Mathematics that can stop an AI apocalypse". Related talks were given in other UK universities.

He makes regular appearances in UK media and is a BBC expert voice, as well as a speaker for the UK charity, Speakers for Schools. In 2021 he was a guest on the BBC Radio 4 programme The Life Scientific.

Chamberlain was appointed Officer of the Order of the British Empire (OBE) in the 2022 New Year Honours for services to mathematical sciences.

The University of Bath awarded Chamberlain with an Honorary Doctorate of Science (DSc) in June 2022. The award recognised Chamberlain as 'a tireless champion and role model, for black mathematicians[, h]e gives countless inspirational presentations to both academic and general audiences about the extraordinary accomplishment of black mathematicians.'

== Diversity ==
Chamberlain is of Jamaican parentage, and campaigns for more diversity within the mathematical sciences. He frequently gives talks in UK state schools, through the charity Speakers for Schools. His lecture "The Black Heroes of Mathematics" is popular all over the UK and repeated regularly during Black History Month. In 2016 he was asked by the Black Cultural Archives to submit his own mathematical biography, parts of which were published in Mathematics Today. In 2017 he was included on Powerlist, an annual publication celebrating the 100 most influential British people from African and African Caribbean heritage, and was most recently included in the 2019, 2020, and 2021 editions.

Chamberlain has also a champion of Treating Equality, Diversity and Inclusion as a Science Problem. Chamberlain argues that many other EDI KPI's do not relate to the lived experience of underrepresented groups. Chamberlain has given talks on his Research to the Royal Institution and the Royal Society to name a few. Chamberlain argues that there exist a scientific baseline for EDI which is derived from this statement - "If all things are equal what numbers do we expect to see". Chamberlain has coined this phrase - Chamberlain's law.

== Faith ==
Chamberlain is a Born-Again Christian. At the front of his doctoral thesis, he quoted Philippians 4:13: "I can do all things through Him who strengthens me". Chamberlain also discussed his Christian faith in the book Black and Great: The Essential Workplace Toolkit.
