= Heather Rabbatts =

British television executive (born 1955)

Dame Heather Victoria Rabbatts, DBE (born 6 December 1955) is a Jamaican-born British solicitor, businesswoman, and broadcaster, who rose to prominence as Chief executive of the London Borough of Lambeth, the youngest council chief in the UK. She served as a Football Association director from 2011 to 2017 and was the first ethnic minority person to do so. She was also the only woman on its board.

== Early life and education ==
Rabbatts was born in Kingston, Jamaica in 1955 and moved to England, when she was three years old. She left school with five O-levels and attended evening classes to study for A-levels. She attended the London School of Economics and became a barrister in 1981.

== Career ==
=== Local government ===
From 1987, she worked in local government, becoming deputy chief executive of Hammersmith and Fulham in 1989. She became chief executive of Merton before being appointed to the post of chief executive of Lambeth in 1995.

There were significant improvements in housing, education, and council tax collection. She made her name as the youngest council chief in the country. On leaving Lambeth, in March 2000, Rabbatts became Chief executive of iMPOWER, a public sector consultancy, which she both founded and was co-chair.

=== Directorships and oversight ===
Rabbatts was a Governor of the BBC from 1999 to 2001, but resigned upon her appointment to Channel 4 where she was managing director of Channel 4's education programmes and business, 4Learning. She is a Governor at the London School of Economics, an Associate of The King's Fund and on the board of directors at the British Council.

In 2010, Rabbatts became a Trustee of Malaria No More UK and later took over as the Chair of Trustees.

In February 2013, she was assessed as one of the 100 most powerful women in the United Kingdom by Woman's Hour on BBC Radio 4.

=== Football ===
On 3 May 2006, Rabbatts was appointed as the new Executive Deputy Chair of Millwall F.C., and, on 27 October 2006, she was appointed as Executive Chairwoman of Millwall Holdings plc, taking over from Peter de Savary.

On 22 December 2011, Rabbatts became the first woman to be appointed as a director of The Football Association.

In October 2013, she criticised the make-up of the Football Association's commission to improve the national team as being "all-white, all-male"; Rio Ferdinand was subsequently added to the commission.

On 1 June 2015, she resigned from FIFA's anti-discrimination taskforce following Sepp Blatter's re-election as president.

On 14 June 2017 it was announced that she would step down from the board of the FA

=== Media ===
On 24 July 2011, she was the guest on Desert Island Discs on BBC Radio 4; her chosen favourite song, book, and luxury item were Corinne Bailey Rae's version of "Que Sera, Sera", Jane Austen's Pride and Prejudice, and a solar powered digital photo album, respectively.

In April 2014, she was a judge in the BBC Woman's Hour power list 2014.

== Honours ==
Rabbatts was appointed Commander of the Order of the British Empire (CBE) in the 2000 New Year Honours and Dame Commander of the Order of the British Empire (DBE) in the 2016 New Year Honours for services to football and equality. In November 2016, she was listed as one of BBC's 100 Women.
