= Joe Clough =

First Black bus driver in London

- Born: Joseph Alan Clough; 10 November 1885; Kingston, Jamaica
- Died: 27 December 1976 (aged 91); Bedford, Bedfordshire, England
- Known for: First Black bus driver in London

Joe Clough (10 November 1885 – 27 December 1976) was a taxi and bus driver.

Clough was the first Black bus driver in London. In 2021, a play written by Neil Gore about Clough's life debuted at The Place Theatre in Bedford.

== Biography ==
Joseph Alan Clough was born on 10 November 1885 in Kingston, Jamaica.

Clough died on 27 December 1976 at Bedford Hospital.
