= Henry Gunter =

British civil rights activist (1920–2007)

- Born: 1920; Portland, Jamaica
- Died: 23 July 2007 (aged 86–87)
- Citizenship: United Kingdom
- Occupations: Machine operator, tool cutter, trade unionist
- Organization(s): Amalgamated Engineering Union. Afro Caribbean Society
- Known for: Black civil rights leader. Communist activist. Trade union activism.
- Notable work: A Man's A Man (1954)
- Political party: Communist Party USA (CPUSA); Communist Party of Great Britain (CPGB)

Henry Gunter (1920 – 23 July 2007) was a leading British communist and civil rights leader, most famous for his campaigns for racial equality in the English city of Birmingham. After joining the Communist Party of Great Britain (CPGB), he authored a report titled A Man's a Man (1954), a key British anti-racist text published by the CPGB. He also authored numerous articles exposing racism in Birmingham's hotels, housing, and employment. Gunter also helped create the Birmingham branch of the Caribbean Labour Congress, and later served as the leader of the Afro Caribbean Society, which he used to end racial segregation in the employment of Birmingham city's bus services. As an influential trade union leader, Gunter was the first black man to serve as a delegate for the Birmingham Trades Council, and he forwarded a successful motion to the Trades Union Congress in support of the rights of immigrant workers. He dedicated his entire life to both trade union activism and fighting for the equal rights of black people.

== Early life ==
Born in Portland, Jamaica, in 1920, Harold Gunter studied in college to become an accountant, before leaving for the Panama Canal Zone in 1940.

== Travelling the world (1940–1950) ==
The United States, which controlled the Canal Zone, were recruiting Jamaicans, convincing Gunter and many others to travel there for work in 1940. After arriving at the American-controlled Canal, Gunter witnessed racial segregation for the first time in his life because the United States enforced Jim Crow laws in every territory they occupied. After briefly returning to Jamaica, he moved to a northern region of the United States known as Milwaukee, where he began working with local unions and started writing newspaper articles. His advocacy for the rights of African Americans led to his writings being republished in Jamaica. During this time, Gunter met members of the Communist Party USA, who were supporters of equal rights for all races of people. Gunter continued working in the United States until the end of World War II, becoming more deeply entrenched in the trade union movement and the fight for the rights of black people. After Gunter briefly returned to Jamaica after World War II, an American regime security force called the Federal Bureau of Investigation (FBI) began to target him for his anti-racist activism and refused to allow Gunter to return to the United States. It is thought that one of the reasons the FBI barred him from returning was due to his publication of a newspaper titled The Jamaican Worker.

Returning to Jamaica after World War II, Gunter joined the People's National Party and worked closely with one of their leaders, the communist icon Richard Hart. Job opportunities were extremely few after Gunter had been blocked from returning to the United States, so he chose to instead move to Britain, where he would then spend the remainder of his life, making his home in the English city of Birmingham sometime in 1949.

== Life in Britain ==
=== Trade Union achievements ===
After moving to Birmingham, Gunter immediately joined the Communist Party of Great Britain (CPGB), playing an important role in the party for many years. Despite being educated as an accountant he was sent to work in a brass rolling mill in Deritend, where he was soon fired after he challenged the racist views of a shop steward. After finding another job in Erdington as a tool cutter and machine operator, he became an active member of the Amalgamated Engineering Union. One of his greatest achievements in the trade union movement was becoming the first black delegate to the Birmingham Trades Council. He achieved further success within the trade union movement after forwarding a successful motion to the Trades Union Congress, one of the largest trade unions in the United Kingdom, in support of the rights of immigrant workers in Britain. The motion stated:

In view of the appalling conditions which immigrant workers have to live under in Birmingham, we ask that the TUC demand that the government provide accommodation for the workers

While serving as an active CPGB activist, Gunter also helped form the Birmingham branch of the Caribbean Labour Congress, an organisation dedicated to promoting workers rights and universal suffrage in the Caribbean. He often wrote articles for their newspaper Caribbean News.

=== Fight against Birmingham racial segregation ===
During the 1950s, racial segregation in Britain, often dubbed the "colour bar", was particularly strong in Birmingham, and the local branch of the CPGB asked Gunter to write about the situation within the city. Gunter wrote a work titled A Man's A Man: A Study of Colour Bar in Birmingham and an Answer (1954), which was published by the Communist Party of Great Britain. This work became a key British anti-racist text and had a national effect on how British people saw racial issues in the UK.

Gunter joined the Afro Caribbean Society and soon became its leader, addressing public meetings on racism and organising marches under the banner "No Colour Bar to Housing and Jobs". He led the Afro Caribbean Society to campaign for an end to racial discrimination in Birmingham city's bus transport system, which was refusing to hire black people, and the city council consequently changed this policy and allowed black people to join the bus services as employees.

In 1958, Gunter met American black civil rights legend Paul Robeson, who was very often a guest of British communist activists. Gunter also met Seretse Khama, who went on to become the president of Botswana. Other famous figures with whom Gunter became acquanted include the pan-Africanist author and journalist George Padmore, and the politician Fenner Brockway.

In 2003, Gunter was commended by the Black History Foundation, who honoured him for "his outstanding service to the city of Birmingham."

== Death and legacy ==
Henry Gunter died on 23 July 2007.

Methodist reverend Vicky Atkinson, a community leader who had lived in the same area as Gunter and knew him personally, said that Gunter "was a person who stuck by his principles and, as well as being an activist and very political, was also well read and articulate." She went on to say that he "was a good man. He will be missed by a lot of people."

The Communist Party of Britain (CPB) the continuation of the original Communist Party of Great Britain (CPGB), of which Gunter had been a member, wrote Henry Gunter's short biography and described him as one of the party's "many unsung heroes".

Unite the Union included Gunter in their 2014 Black History Month list of honoured British and Irish civil rights leaders.

Research papers connected to Henry Gunter are contained in the Wolfson Centre for Archival Research, held under the name "MS 2165".

== See also ==
- Dorothy Kuya
- Trevor Carter
- Len Johnson
- Billy Strachan
- Claudia Jones
- Charlie Hutchison
