= William Robinson Clarke =

Jamaican WWI airman

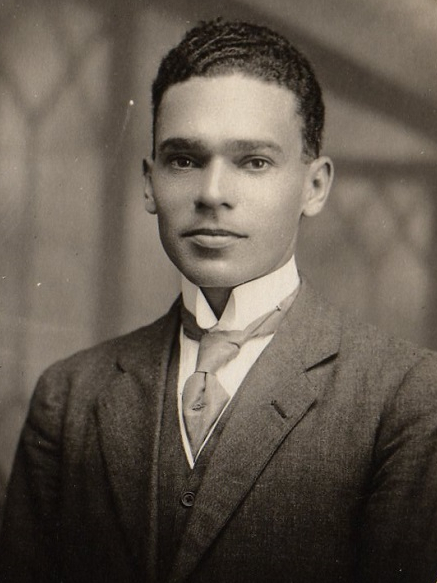
- Clarke, c. 1914
- Born: 4 October 1895; Kingston, British Jamaica
- Died: 26 April 1981 (aged 85); Kingston, Jamaica
- Burial place: Military Cemetery at Up Park Camp, Kingston, Jamaica
- Military career
- Allegiance: United Kingdom
- Branch: Royal Flying Corps
- Service years: 1915–1919
- Rank: Sergeant
- Nickname: Robbie
- Units: No. 4 Squadron RAF; No. 254 Squadron RAF
- Conflicts: World War I; Battle of Messines
- Awards: Silver War Badge
- Other work: Builder

Sergeant William Robinson Clarke (4 October 1895 – 26 April 1981) was a Jamaican World War I airman who was the first Black pilot to fly for Britain.

== Early life ==
Clarke was born in Kingston, Jamaica, on 4 October 1895, son of Egbert Clarke and Eugenia Clarke (née Calm). He was one of four children. He became a mechanic, and was one of the first individuals in Jamaica to learn to drive.

== World War I ==
On the outbreak of the First World War in 1914, Clarke, aged 19, travelled to England at his own cost. He joined the Royal Flying Corps on 26 July 1915. He served initially as a mechanic and then as a driver for an observation balloon company.

In December 1916 he began pilot training, gaining his wings on 26 April 1917. Promoted to Pilot Sergeant, he was posted to No. 4 Squadron RFC at Abeele on 27 May 1917, flying R.E.8 biplanes over the Western Front. On the morning of 28 July 1917 during a reconnaissance mission flying five miles behind the German front line near Ypres, Clarke and his observer, Second Lieutenant F. P. Blencowe, were attacked by armed German scout aircraft. After Clarke was seriously wounded and lost consciousness, his observer brought the aeroplane back across British lines before making a forced landing near Godewaersvelde. In a letter to his mother, Clarke wrote:

"I was doing some photographs a few miles the other side when about five Hun scouts came down upon me, and before I could get away, I got a bullet through the spine. I managed to pilot the machine nearly back to the aerodrome, but had to put her down as I was too weak to fly any more … My observer escaped without any injury."

Clarke recovered from his wounds but was unfit to fly, and so returned to duty as a mechanic with No. 254 Squadron in England. He was honourably discharged in 1919, receiving the Silver War Badge.

== Later life ==
After recovering from his wounds, Clarke returned to Jamaica. He was granted a free passage, and the cost of his journey to England was reimbursed. He was later active in the building trade. He was active in veterans affairs and was life president of the Jamaican branch of the Royal Air Forces Association.

== Commemoration ==
In 2021 the Imperial War Museum announced the acquisition of an identification bracelet belonging to Clarke into their collections.

== See also ==
- Eugene Bullard, was the first African-American military pilot, who flew for France.
- Ahmet Ali Çelikten of the Ottoman Empire.
- Domenico Mondelli in Italy.
