= Wilston Samuel Jackson =

First black British train driver

- Born: 17 May 1927
- Died: 17 September 2018 (aged 91)
- Known for: First black British train driver

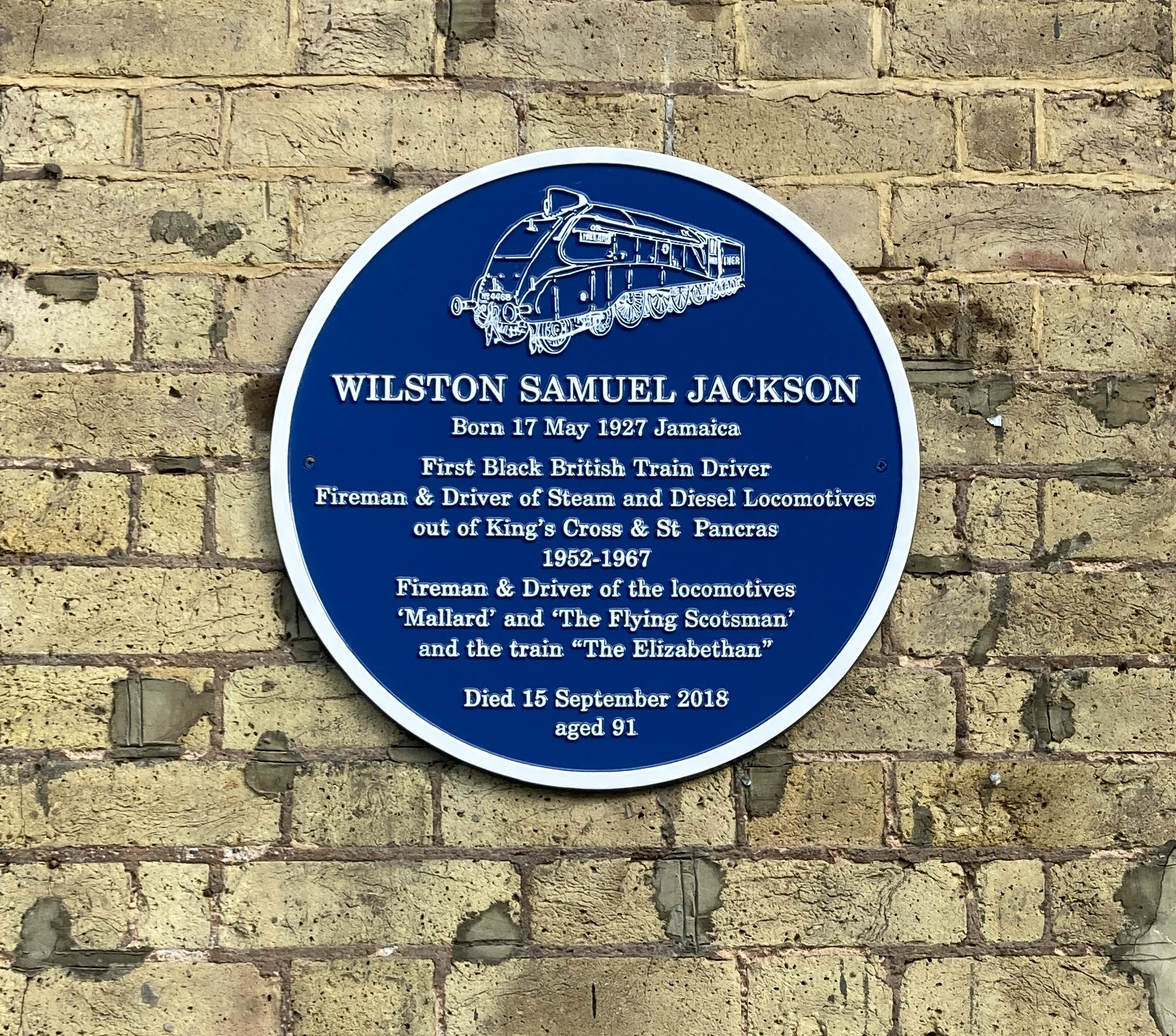
Blue plaque to Wilston Samuel Jackson at King's Cross station

Wilston Samuel Jackson (17 May 1927–15 September 2018) was Britain's first black train driver. Known as 'Bill', he was born in Jamaica in 1927 and moved to the UK as part of the Windrush generation. After working as a fireman, he was appointed train driver in 1962. At one point he drove the Flying Scotsman and Mallard locomotives. He later emigrated to Zambia where he taught people how to drive trains. He is honoured by a blue plaque at London King's Cross station.

He died on 15 September 2018 at the age of 91.
