= Eric Irons =

British magistrate and campaigner (1921–2007)

Eric Irons OBE
- Born: 1921; Spanish Town, Jamaica
- Died: 3 August 2007, aged 86; Nottingham, England

Eric George Irons OBE (1921–2007) was Britain's first black magistrate and a campaigner for equal rights.

== Early life ==
Born in Spanish Town, Jamaica, he was recruited into the RAF in Jamaica in 1944 and in 1945 visited RAF Syerston but was based at Little Rissington, Bedford. From this visit, he decided he wanted to live in Nottingham. He extended his service with the RAF for a further five years, married a local girl from Nottingham, Nellie Kelham, and settled on Pennyfoot Street. Eric and Nellie went on to raise 6 children together. His mum was a cook and his father was a policeman.

== Career ==
His lifelong passion for racial equality inspired him to move into public life. Because of the prejudices shown towards black people in the 1950s, Irons set up the first community group, the Colonial Social and Sports Club, at his own house.

Irons began work at Chilwell Ordnance Depot in the offices in 1952. Only a handful of black workers were employed at the depot. He began to take up the issue of discrimination with the Nottingham and District Trades Council. Through his efforts of negotiation, some of the problems were resolved and more black workers were taken on, both in the depot and in other employment.

In 1955 Irons went on to the Consultative Committee for the welfare of black people, which was set up by a Council of Church/Social Services and the Colonial Social and Sports Club. The idea was to discuss prejudice and local issues. One of the problems lay in the fact that no black people were taking advantage of educational courses, particularly those held by the WEA.

He challenged and helped to lift a city transport embargo on the employment of black workers and also helped the city council to tackle problems highlighted by the 1958 race riots.

He made history in 1962 when he was appointed Britain's first black magistrate; he sat on the Nottingham bench for 29 years until his retirement in 1991.

A champion for social justice, Eric Irons was awarded an OBE in the 1978 New Year Honours list.

In 1999, the University of Nottingham awarded him an honorary Master of Arts degree for improving race relations in the city.

== Commemoration ==
The National Portrait Gallery, London, acquired a portrait of Eric Irons in 2017 as part of their Creative Connections: Nottingham project. The portrait was displayed as part of the exhibition by artist, Katherine Green, at Nottingham Contemporary in 2017, and then at the National Portrait Gallery until February 2017.

In October 2019, a plaque was put up in Iron's memory by Nottingham Civic Society at the National Justice Museum in Nottingham.
