= Caroline Newman =

Jamaican-born British solicitor and entrepreneur

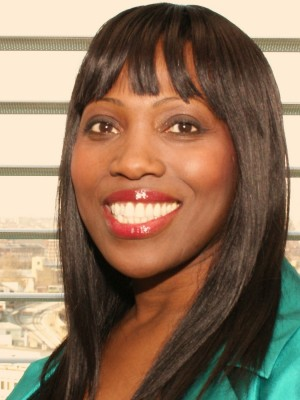
- Born: October 31, 1963 (age 62); Kingston, Jamaica
- Occupations: Solicitor and entrepreneur
- Known for: Founding the African Women Lawyer's Association

Caroline Newman (born 31 October 1963) is a British solicitor, author, entrepreneur and diversity and equality advocate. In 2002, she was the first black solicitor to be elected to the Council of the Law Society of England and Wales. In 2014, Newman founded the African Women Lawyer’s Association (AWLA), which exists to promote the potential of women of African and Caribbean descent in the legal profession.

== Early life and education ==
Newman was born at Kingston Public Hospital in Kingston, Jamaica to Renel and Girlie Newman. Her parents, along with their six children, immigrated to the UK, settling in Newport, Wales.

Newman attended Newport Duffryn High School achieving 10 GCE O Levels and later attended Newport College of Further Education where she obtained a BEC National Diploma in Business Studies and two A levels. She read law part time at the University of Westminster and graduated with a 2:1 in 1992. During her undergraduate years, she also studied criminology and wrote a paper on race and injustice. Here she learnt of the unequal treatment of black people in the criminal justice system and the disparity in incarceration rates. Newman then earned a Masters in law and political science at the London School of Economics in 1995, where she wrote her dissertation on the Police and Criminal Evidence Act under the supervision of Michael Zander. Later she enrolled at the College of Law and became a qualified solicitor.

== Legal career ==
Newman trained at London law firm SJ Berwin. Newman was the first Black woman to be awarded a training contract at the firm and was initially one of only two black trainees and solicitors. In 2004 a senior partner in the firm called her a “black sheep”. Newman raised the matter with the firm’s management and was able to secure their commitment to introduce diversity policies and training.

=== The Law Society of England and Wales ===
Starting in 2002 Newman served seven years on the Council and has chaired several of the Law Society's committees. Starting in 2003 for five years she chaired the Equality and Diversity Committee. In 2014 she was elected as the inaugural chair of the Ethnic Minority Lawyers’ Division Committee. During this time, she also represented the society on the Institute of Chartered Accountants in England and Wales Investigative Committee, ensuring that issues around diversity were central to investigations. In 2019 she was appointed to the board of the Law Society.

=== The African Women Lawyer's Association (AWLA) ===
Founded by Newman in 2014, the AWLA seeks to assist and empower women of African descent who want to enter the legal profession or advance their current legal career. Its ultimate goal is to combat what Newman describes as the ‘double discrimination’ of sexism and racism that black women often face in the legal profession. Some of the AWLA's services include liaison with the Law Societies and Bar Councils, attendance of the Law Society Black and Minority Ethnic and Women’s divisions meetings, research for members, advice, workshops and seminars on a range of issues including legislative change, the ability to network with other BAME lawyers and assistance to members who are victims of injustice. Newman currently serves as a Director of the association.

=== Business Ventures ===
Newman founded her business Lawdacity in 2006, a training and consultancy firm that coaches solicitors, barristers, judges, lawyers and legal executives. This was incorporated in 2010. She has authored a series of books including Legal Gold for Coaches: How to Sell and Deliver Coaching, Training, and Consulting Services to Lawyers, and features in Love Unboxed, an anthology published in 2017.

== Diversity and Equality Advocacy ==
Newman has delivered equality, diversity and bias training to the legal community, police and armed forces. Under her influence the Solicitors Regulation Authority amended their code of conduct for firms, making it a disciplinary offence to discriminate against an employee. For her advocacy, Newman was awarded Diversity Champion at the UK Diversity Legal Awards in 2018, an event co-sponsored by the Law Society, Solicitors Regulation Authority and General Council of the Bar.

Following the murder of George Floyd on 29 May 2020 and the subsequent protests led by the Black Lives Matter movement, Newman co-founded a local group promoting Action for Racial Equality and education of the local community. Also, working with the local parish she co-founded the Diversity, Inclusion, Cohesion and Engagement Committee which is assisting the parochial church council with research into racial inequality and discrimination in the church and making recommendations for change and inclusivity of all members of the congregation and the local community. Newman also used her position in the AWLA to speak out against the mistreatment of Meghan Markle in the British press, calling for the ‘racial discrimination’ to stop and offering her solidarity.

=== The Howard League for Penal Reform ===
Newman served as a trustee for the Howard League for Penal Reform for 15 years, pushing the government to adopt humane prison reform. She was part of the Howard League’s flagship research programme which ensured the release of girls under the age of 18 from British prisons into more suitable accommodation. She also helped to create the Citizenship and Crime Project in schools, which taught pupils of their rights and responsibilities as citizens.

=== The Mental Health Foundation ===
As a policy manager of the Mental Health Foundation she led the policy development into the needs of mentally disordered offenders, which aimed to divert these offenders into health and social care instead of the criminal justice system.

== Personal life ==
She was married to Donald Peter Herbert OBE who is a barrister and founder of the Society of Black Lawyers.
