= Les Ballets Nègres =

Europe's first Black dance company

Les Ballets Nègres was Europe's first Black dance company, founded in 1946 by Jamaican dancers Berto Pasuka and Ritchie Riley, along with brother and sister dancers Tony and Pearl Johnson. Berto Pasuka (1911-1963, original name Wilbert Passerley) was born in Jamaica and trained as a classical ballet dancer in Kingston. He moved to London in 1939 and took further training in choreography at the Astafieva Dance School. Pasuka was asked to dance in and help recruit other dancers for the film Men of Two Worlds in 1946, and this experience prompted him to start his own dance company. Richard "Richie" Riley (1910-1997) first performed with Pasuka while in Jamaica. He migrated to London in 1946.

Other members of the troupe included the dancers John Lagey and Elroy Josephs and the Nigerian musicians Bobby Benson and Ambrose Campbell.

The English composer (of Spanish origin) Leonard Salzedo and his wife, the dancer Pat Clover, were closely involved with the group, and Salzedo wrote four scores for them for piano, tom tom and maracas: De Prophet, They Came, Market Day and Aggrey. Their first performance was at the Twentieth Century Theatre in Westbourne Grove, London, on 30 April 1946. Performances of They Came and Market Day were broadcast by BBC Television on 8 June 1949. A further television broadcast was made on 3 January 1950. The company disbanded in 1953, after several European tours, due to a lack of funding.

After the closure of the company Pasuka continued to dance, and was photographed by Angus McBean. His last stage appearance was in 1959 at the Royal Court Theatre in Sean O'Casey's Cock-a-Doodle Dandy (dancing as the cockerel of the title). In April 1963 he was found ill in his Paris apartment and died at a hospital in Wimbledon. Riley gave up dancing and trained at the Slade School of Fine Art in painting and sculpture. He became involved in the West Indian Standing Conference, established in 1958, and featured in the BBC documentaries Ballet Black in 1982 and Storm in a Teacup (with Quentin Crisp, on the history of gay bars) in 1992. Riley became severely disabled in later life, losing both of his legs.

On 8 August 1999 a tribute to Les Ballets Nègres was staged at the Royal Festival Hall in London's Southbank Centre. In October 2024 an exhibition - Into the Light: Pioneers of Black British Ballet - was funded by the National Lottery Heritage Fund. It was scheduled to tour 25 libraries around the UK until November 2025.
