= Sean Clerkin =

Scottish political activist

Sean Clerkin is a Scottish political activist who frequently appears in UK media, and has been charged multiple times for breach of the peace.

== Early life ==
Clerkin was born about 1961 in Paisley, Renfrewshire, Scotland. His father was a member of the Amalgamated Engineering Union and worked as a machine operator at Rolls-Royce in Hillington, Scotland. Clerkin grew up in Pollok, Glasgow and studied politics at University of Strathclyde.

== Activism ==
Clerkin stood as the Scottish Socialist Party candidate for Paisley South in the 1997 Paisley South by-election, coming last out of the six candidates with 0.4% of the vote. He advocated for higher taxation of the wealthy, proportional representation for councillors and Members of the Scottish Parliament, and opposed privatisation of the NHS.

During the 2011 Scottish Parliament election, Scottish Labour leader Iain Gray was confronted by protestors from "Citizens United Against Public Sector Cuts" led by Clerkin at a Labour campaign event in Glasgow Central station. The event was cut short, and the Labour activists took shelter in a Subway sandwich shop across the street, being followed by the protestors.

Clerkin was charged in July 2014 with breach of the peace for attempting to disrupt the baton relay during the 2014 Commonwealth Games, after running into the road while the relay passed through Barrhead. After being charged he was released on bail but banned from all Commonwealth Games venues. He was cleared of the charge in October the following year.

During the 2015 United Kingdom general election, Clerkin attempted to enter a Labour Party event at Glasgow Royal Concert Hall. He was charged with breach of the peace, found guilty and given a £1000 fine. Clerkin appealed the decision to the High Court but lost the appeal.

In December 2015, Clerkin and two other members of Scottish Resistance attended Rutherglen police station to report Prime Minister of the United Kingdom David Cameron to Police Scotland for war crimes over the bombing of Syria by British planes.

In January 2016, Clerkin and two other "Scottish Resistance" activists held a protest outside the Tunnock's factory in Uddingston. They were protesting against Tunnock's managing director Boyd Tunnock, saying "people like him, who are multi-millionaires, and supporting the Tories as they do, are helping to keep Scots in poverty".

While protesting a Conservative party event at Hamilton Academical F.C.'s New Douglas Park in April 2016, Clerkin fell while being escorted out by the stadium manager, and claimed he had been assaulted. The police investigated the claim and it resulted in Clerkin being charged and found guilty of wasting police time.

After being suspended from the Scottish Resistance group, Clerkin set up a splinter group called Action for Scotland. Coverage of the Action for Scotland launch event mostly focused on the difficulty Clerkin had lighting a Union Flag on fire.

Clerkin was arrested and charged with breach of the peace again after he and a group of Scottish Resistance members briefly occupied the Spanish consulate in Edinburgh to protest in favour of Catalan independence.

After displaying his "England Get Out of Scotland" banner outside the SNP conference in 2019, Clerkin was expelled from the Scottish Resistance group by its founder James Scott.

Clerkin was again arrested in September 2020 after displaying a banner saying "England Get Out of Scotland" at Edinburgh Airport in August 2020. He was charged with breach of the peace and breaching the Criminal Justice and Licensing (Scotland) Act 2010 by displaying an offensive banner. A trial was set to take place in December 2021 but the charges were dropped the morning of the trial.

After questions were raised about money that had been donated to the SNP to campaign during a proposed second independence referendum, Clerkin lodged a complaint with Police Scotland. That, and other similar complaints, led to Operation Branchform being launched, that would see charges filed against SNP Chief Executive Peter Murrell.

In 2022, during the July–September 2022 Conservative Party leadership election, Clerkin was one of the protestors outside the hustings in Perth, standing behind a large banner stating "Tory Scum Out".
