= Second Blair ministry =

2001-2005 Government the United Kingdom

- Cabinet of the United Kingdom
- 2001–2005
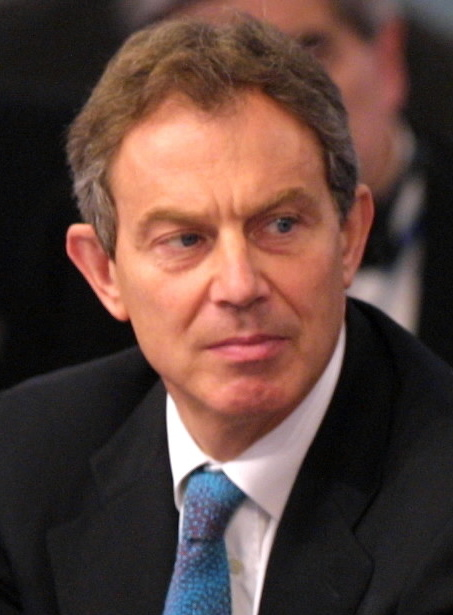
- Blair in 2002
- Date formed: 8 June 2001
- Date dissolved: 6 May 2005

People and organisations
- Monarch: Elizabeth II
- Prime Minister: Tony Blair
- Prime Minister's history: Premiership of Tony Blair
- Deputy Prime Minister: John Prescott
- Member party: Labour Party
- Status in legislature: Majority
- Opposition cabinet: Hague shadow cabinet; Duncan Smith shadow cabinet; Howard Shadow Cabinet
- Opposition party: Conservative Party
- Opposition leader: William Hague (2001); Iain Duncan Smith (2001–2003); Michael Howard (2003–2005)

History
- Election: 2001 general election
- Outgoing election: 2005 general election
- Legislature terms: 53rd UK Parliament
- Budgets: 2002 budget; 2003 budget; 2004 budget; 2005 budget
- Predecessor: First Blair ministry
- Successor: Third Blair ministry

The second Blair ministry lasted from June 2001 to May 2005. Following the financial crisis in Japan at the end of the 1990s, there was a brief recession in other parts of the developed world including Germany, Italy and France in the early-2000s, but the UK avoided recession and continued to maintain a strong economy and low unemployment.

By the time the next general election was on the horizon, Labour were looking well positioned for a record third successive term in government. Unemployment remained low and the economy remained strong with more than a decade of unbroken growth, and education and healthcare had changed for the better as a result of expenditure by Labour.

However, the Labour government had attracted controversy by sending British troops to fight in Afghanistan in the aftermath of the 11 September terrorist attacks on the United States in 2001, and even more so when it joined the American-led invasion of Iraq eighteen months later – particularly when it emerged that the ousted Iraqi leader Saddam Hussein's alleged weapons of mass destruction were never found, and serious questions were raised about the issue of going to war. Although the regimes in both of these countries were swiftly ended by British and American troops, the remaining British forces were not withdrawn from Iraq until 2009 and not from Afghanistan until 2021.

Soon after the controversial invasion of Iraq in 2003, Labour support in the opinion polls fell and the Conservatives drew level with them in at least one poll during 2003. However, this did little to end speculation about the future of their unpopular leader Iain Duncan Smith and in October 2003, he lost a vote of no confidence and was replaced by Michael Howard, who stood unopposed for the leadership role and took control without a leadership contest.

== Cabinet ==
Portfolio	Minister	Term
Cabinet ministers
Prime Minister; First Lord of the Treasury; Minister for the Civil Service	Tony Blair	1997–2007
Deputy Prime Minister; First Secretary of State	John Prescott	1997–2007
Chancellor of the Exchequer; Second Lord of the Treasury	Gordon Brown	1997–2007
Lord High Chancellor of Great Britain	Derry Irvine, Baron Irvine of Lairg	1997–2003
Lord High Chancellor of Great Britain	Charlie Falconer, Baron Falconer of Thoroton	2003–2007
Secretary of State for Constitutional Affairs	Charlie Falconer, Baron Falconer of Thoroton	2003–2007
Leader of the House of Commons	Robin Cook	2001–2003
Leader of the House of Commons	John Reid	2003
Leader of the House of Commons	Peter Hain MP	2003–2005
Lord President of the Council	Robin Cook	2001–2003
Lord President of the Council	John Reid	2003
Lord President of the Council	Gareth Williams, Baron Williams of Mostyn	2003
Lord President of the Council	Valerie Amos, Baroness Amos	2003–2007
Leader of the House of Lords	Gareth Williams, Baron Williams of Mostyn	2001–2003
Leader of the House of Lords	Valerie Amos, Baroness Amos	2003–2007
Lord Keeper of the Privy Seal	Gareth Williams, Baron Williams of Mostyn	2001–2003
Lord Keeper of the Privy Seal	Peter Hain	2003–2005
Chief Secretary to the Treasury	Andrew Smith	1999–2002
Chief Secretary to the Treasury	Paul Boateng	2002–2005
Foreign Secretary	Jack Straw	2001–2006
Home Secretary	David Blunkett	2001–2004
Home Secretary	Charles Clarke	2004–2006
Secretary of State for Environment, Food and Rural Affairs	Margaret Beckett	2001–2006
Secretary of State for Transport, Local Government and the Regions	Stephen Byers	2001–2002
Secretary of State for Transport	Alistair Darling	2002–2006
Secretary of State for Health	Alan Milburn	1999–2003
Secretary of State for Health	John Reid	2003–2005
Secretary of State for Defence	Geoff Hoon	1999–2005
Secretary of State for Work and Pensions	Alistair Darling	2001–2002
Secretary of State for Work and Pensions	Andrew Smith	2002–2004
Secretary of State for Work and Pensions	Alan Johnson	2004–2005
Secretary of State for Education and Skills	Estelle Morris	2001–2002
Secretary of State for Education and Skills	Charles Clarke	2002–2004
Secretary of State for Education and Skills	Ruth Kelly	2004–2006
Secretary of State for Trade and Industry; President of the Board of Trade; Minister for Women	Patricia Hewitt	2001–2005
Secretary of State for Culture, Media and Sport	Tessa Jowell	2001–2007
Secretary of State for International Development	Clare Short	1997–2003
Secretary of State for International Development	Valerie Amos, Baroness Amos	2003
Secretary of State for International Development	Hilary Benn	2003–2007
Secretary of State for Northern Ireland	John Reid	2001–2002
Secretary of State for Northern Ireland	Paul Murphy	2002–2005
Secretary of State for Scotland	Helen Liddell	2001–2003
Secretary of State for Scotland	Alistair Darling	2003–2006
Secretary of State for Wales	Paul Murphy	1999–2002
Secretary of State for Wales	Peter Hain	2002–2008
Minister without Portfolio; Chairman of the Labour Party	Charles Clarke	2001–2002
Minister without Portfolio; Chairman of the Labour Party	John Reid	2002–2003
Minister without Portfolio; Chairman of the Labour Party	Ian McCartney	2003–2006
Also attending cabinet meetings
Chief Whip; Parliamentary Secretary to the Treasury	Hilary Armstrong	2001–2006
Attorney General for England and Wales	Peter Goldsmith, Baron Goldsmith	2001–2007

=== Changes ===
- May 2002 – Stephen Byers resigns and the Department of Transport, Local Government & the Regions is broken up. Alistair Darling becomes Secretary of State for Transport. John Prescott's Office of the Deputy Prime Minister assumes the Local Government & the Regions portfolio. Andrew Smith becomes Work and Pensions Secretary. Paul Boateng becomes Chief Secretary to the Treasury. Complete list of changes
- October 2002 – Estelle Morris resigns. Charles Clarke becomes Education Secretary; John Reid becomes Minister without Portfolio and Labour Party chairman. Paul Murphy becomes Northern Ireland Secretary. Peter Hain becomes Welsh Secretary.
- March 2003 – Robin Cook resigns. John Reid becomes Lord President of the Council & Leader of the House of Commons. Ian McCartney becomes Minister without Portfolio and Labour Party chairman.
- May 2003 – Clare Short resigns and is succeeded by Baroness Amos as International Development Secretary.
- June 2003 – In a reshuffle John Reid becomes Health Secretary. Lord Falconer of Thoroton assumes the new position of Secretary of State for Constitutional Affairs, also becoming Lord Chancellor. Alistair Darling becomes Scottish Secretary remaining also Transport Secretary. Peter Hain becomes Lord Privy Seal & Leader of the House of Commons, remaining also Welsh Secretary. Alan Milburn, Lord Irvine and Helen Liddell leave the Cabinet. Complete list of changes
- October 2003 – Baroness Amos becomes Lord President of the Council & Leader of the House of Lords, following the death of Lord Williams of Mostyn. Hilary Benn becomes International Development Secretary.
- September 2004 – Andrew Smith resigns as Secretary of State for Work and Pensions and is succeeded by Alan Johnson. Alan Milburn returns to government with a seat in the Cabinet as Chancellor of the Duchy of Lancaster mainly at the head of policy co-ordination; he replaces Douglas Alexander, who was not in the Cabinet.
- December 2004 – David Blunkett resigns as Home Secretary and is succeeded by Charles Clarke. Ruth Kelly succeeds Clarke as Secretary of State for Education and Skills.

== List of ministers ==
=== Prime Minister, the Cabinet Office and non-Departmental ministers ===
Cabinet Office
Prime Minister of the United Kingdom; First Lord of the Treasury; Minister for the Civil Service	Tony Blair	June 2001 – May 2005
Deputy Prime Minister; First Secretary of State	John Prescott	June 2001 – May 2005
Minister for the Cabinet Office; Chancellor of the Duchy of Lancaster	Gus Macdonald, Baron Macdonald of Tradeston	June 2001 – June 2003
Minister for the Cabinet Office; Chancellor of the Duchy of Lancaster	Douglas Alexander	June 2003 – September 2004
Minister for the Cabinet Office; Chancellor of the Duchy of Lancaster	Alan Milburn	September 2004 – May 2005
Minister of State for the Cabinet Office	Baroness Morgan of Huyton (also Deputy Minister for Women)	June–November 2001
Minister of State for the Cabinet Office	Barbara Roche (also Deputy Minister for Women)	June 2001 – May 2002
Minister of State for the Cabinet Office	Douglas Alexander	May 2002 – June 2003
Minister of State for the Cabinet Office	Ruth Kelly	September–December 2004
Minister of State for the Cabinet Office	David Miliband	December 2004 – May 2005
Lord High Chancellor of Great Britain	Derry Irvine, Baron Irvine of Lairg	June 2001 – June 2003
Lord High Chancellor of Great Britain	Charlie Falconer, Baron Falconer of Thoroton	June 2003 – May 2005
Lord President of the Council	Robin Cook	June 2001 – March 2003
Lord President of the Council	John Reid	March 2003 – June 2003
Lord President of the Council	Gareth Williams, Baron Williams of Mostyn	June–September 2003
Lord President of the Council	Valerie Amos, Baroness Amos	September 2003 – May 2005
Lord Keeper of the Privy Seal	Gareth Williams, Baron Williams of Mostyn	June 2001 – June 2003
Lord Keeper of the Privy Seal	Peter Hain	June 2003 – May 2005
Minister Without Portfolio; Chairman of the Labour Party	Charles Clarke	June 2001 – October 2002
Minister Without Portfolio; Chairman of the Labour Party	John Reid	October 2002 – April 2003
Minister Without Portfolio; Chairman of the Labour Party	Ian McCartney	April 2003 – May 2005
Parliamentary Under Secretary of State	Chris Leslie	June 2001 – May 2002

=== Departments of state ===
Treasury
Chancellor of the Exchequer	Gordon Brown	June 2001 – May 2005
Chief Secretary to the Treasury	Andrew Smith	June 2001 – May 2002
Chief Secretary to the Treasury	Paul Boateng	May 2002 – May 2005
Paymaster General	Dawn Primarolo	June 2001 – May 2005
Financial Secretary to the Treasury	Paul Boateng	June 2001 – May 2002
Financial Secretary to the Treasury	Ruth Kelly	May 2002 – September 2004
Financial Secretary to the Treasury	Stephen Timms	September 2004 – May 2005
Economic Secretary to the Treasury	Ruth Kelly	June 2001 – May 2002
Economic Secretary to the Treasury	John Healey	May 2002 – May 2005

Foreign and Commonwealth Office
Foreign Secretary	Jack Straw	June 2001 – May 2005
Minister of State for the Middle East	Elizabeth Symons, Baroness Symons of Vernham Dean (also Minister for Trade jointly with Trade and Industry June 2001 – June 2003)	June 2001 – May 2005
Minister of State for Europe	Peter Hain	June 2001 – October 2002
Minister of State for Europe	Denis MacShane	October 2002 – May 2005
Parliamentary Under-Secretary of State for the Balkans and Latin America	Denis MacShane	June 2001 – October 2002
Minister of State for Trade	Mike O'Brien (jointly with Trade and Industry)	June 2003 – September 2004
Minister of State for Trade	Douglas Alexander (jointly with Trade and Industry)	September 2004 – May 2005
Parliamentary Under Secretary of State	Ben Bradshaw	June 2001 – May 2002
Parliamentary Under Secretary of State	Valerie Amos, Baroness Amos	June 2001 – May 2003
Parliamentary Under Secretary of State	Mike 0'Brien	May 2002 – June 2003
Parliamentary Under Secretary of State	Bill Rammell	October 2002 – May 2005
Parliamentary Under Secretary of State	Chris Mullin	June 2003 – May 2005

Home Office
Home Secretary	David Blunkett	June 2001 – December 2004
Home Secretary	Charles Clarke	December 2004 – May 2005
Minister of State for Policing	John Denham	June 2001 – June 2003
Minister of State for Policing	Hazel Blears	June 2003 – May 2005
Minister of State for Prisons	Keith Bradley	June 2001 – May 2002
Minister of State for Prisons	Hilary Benn	May 2002 – May 2003
Minister of State for Prisons	Patricia Scotland, Baroness Scotland of Asthal	June 2003 – May 2005
Minister of State for Immigration, Citizenship and Counterterrorism	Jeff Rooker, Baron Rooker	June 2001 – May 2002
Minister of State for Immigration, Citizenship and Counterterrorism	Beverley Hughes	May 2002 – April 2004
Minister of State for Immigration, Citizenship and Counterterrorism	Des Browne	April 2004 – May 2005
Minister for Criminal Policy	Charlie Falconer, Baron Falconer of Thoroton	May 2002 – June 2003
Parliamentary Under Secretary of State	Beverley Hughes	June 2001 – May 2002
Parliamentary Under Secretary of State	Bob Ainsworth	June 2001 – June 2003
Parliamentary Under Secretary of State	Angela Eagle	June 2001 – May 2002
Parliamentary Under Secretary of State	Geoffrey Filkin, Baron Filkin	May 2002 – June 2003
Parliamentary Under Secretary of State	Michael Wills	May 2002 – July 2003
Parliamentary Under Secretary of State	Paul Goggins	May 2003 – May 2005
Parliamentary Under Secretary of State	Caroline Flint	June 2003 – May 2005
Parliamentary Under Secretary of State	Fiona MacTaggart	June 2003 – May 2005

Department for Environment, Food and Rural Affairs
Secretary of State for Environment, Food and Rural Affairs	Margaret Beckett	June 2001 – May 2005
Minister of State for the Environment	Michael Meacher	June 2001 – June 2003
Minister of State for the Environment	Elliot Morley	June 2003 – May 2005
Minister of State for Rural Affairs	Alun Michael	June 2001 – May 2005
Parliamentary Under Secretary of State	Elliot Morley	June 2001 – June 2003
Parliamentary Under Secretary of State	Larry Whitty, Baron Whitty	June 2001 – May 2005
Parliamentary Under Secretary of State	Ben Bradshaw	June 2003 – May 2005
Parliamentary Under Secretary of State	Catherine Ashton, Baroness Ashton of Upholland (jointly with Constitutional Affairs)	September 2004 – May 2005

Defence
Secretary of State for Defence	Geoff Hoon	June 2001 – May 2005
Minister of State for the Armed Forces	Adam Ingram	June 2001 – May 2005
Minister for Defence Procurement	The Lord Bach	June 2001 – May 2005
Parliamentary Under Secretary of State for Veterans	Lewis Moonie	June 2001 – June 2003
Parliamentary Under Secretary of State for Veterans	Ivor Caplin	June 2003 – May 2005

Education and Skills
Secretary of State for Education and Skills	Estelle Morris	June 2001 – October 2002
Secretary of State for Education and Skills	Charles Clarke	October 2002 – December 2004
Secretary of State for Education and Skills	Ruth Kelly	December 2004 – May 2005
Minister of State for Schools	Stephen Timms	June 2001 – October 2002
Minister of State for Schools	David Miliband	October 2002 – December 2004
Minister of State for Schools	Stephen Twigg	December 2004 – May 2005
Minister for Higher Education	Margaret Hodge	June 2001 – June 2003
Minister for Higher Education	Alan Johnson	June 2003 – September 2004
Minister for Higher Education	Kim Howells	September 2004 – May 2005
Minister for Children	Margaret Hodge	June 2003 – May 2005
Parliamentary Under Secretary of State for Early Years & School Standards (jointly with Work & Pensions from June 2003)	Catherine Ashton, Baroness Ashton of Upholland	June 2001 – September 2004
Parliamentary Under Secretary of State for Early Years & School Standards (jointly with Work & Pensions from June 2003)	Lord Filkin	September 2004 – May 2005
Parliamentary Under Secretary of State for Adult Skills	John Healey	June 2001 – May 2002
Parliamentary Under Secretary of State for Adult Skills	Ivan Lewis	May 2002 – May 2005
Parliamentary Under Secretary of State for Young People & Learning	Ivan Lewis	June 2001 – May 2002
Parliamentary Under Secretary of State for Young People & Learning	Stephen Twigg	May 2002 – December 2004

Health
Secretary of State for Health	Alan Milburn	June 2001 – June 2003
Secretary of State for Health	John Reid	June 2003 – May 2005
Minister of State for Health Services	Jacqui Smith	June 2001 – June 2003
Minister of State for Health Services	Rosie Winterton	June 2003 – May 2005
Minister for Health	John Hutton	June 2001 – May 2005
Minister for Public Health	Yvette Cooper	June 2001 – May 2002
Minister for Public Health	David Lammy	May 2002 – June 2003
Minister for Public Health	Melanie Johnson	June 2003 – May 2005
Parliamentary Under Secretary of State	Philip Hunt, Baron Hunt of Kings Heath	June 2001 – March 2003
Parliamentary Under Secretary of State	Hazel Blears	June 2001 – June 2003
Parliamentary Under Secretary of State	Stephen Ladyman	June 2003 – May 2005
Parliamentary Under Secretary of State	Norman Warner, Baron Warner	June 2003 – May 2005

Work and Pensions
Secretary of State for Work and Pensions	Alistair Darling	June 2001 – May 2002
Secretary of State for Work and Pensions	Andrew Smith	May 2002 – September 2004
Secretary of State for Work and Pensions	Alan Johnson	September 2004 – May 2005
Minister of State for Pensions	Ian McCartney	June 2001 – April 2003
Minister of State for Pensions	Malcolm Wicks	June 2003 – May 2005
Minister of State for Work	Nick Brown	June 2001 – June 2003
Minister of State for Work	Des Browne	June 2003 – April 2004
Minister of State for Work	Jane Kennedy	April 2004 – May 2005
Parliamentary Under Secretary of State	Patricia Hollis, Baroness Hollis of Heigham	June 2001 – May 2005
Parliamentary Under Secretary of State for Disabled People	Maria Eagle	June 2001 – May 2005
Parliamentary Under Secretary of State for Work	Malcolm Wicks	June 2001 – June 2003
Parliamentary Under Secretary of State for Work	Chris Pond	June 2003 – May 2005
Parliamentary Under Secretary of State for Sure Start (jointly with Education)	Catherine Ashton, Baroness Ashton of Upholland	June 2003 – September 2004

Culture, Media and Sport
Secretary of State for Culture, Media and Sport	Tessa Jowell	June 2001 – May 2005
Minister for the Arts	Tessa Blackstone, Baroness Blackstone	June 2001 – June 2003
Minister for the Arts	Estelle Morris	June 2003 – May 2005
Minister for Sport	Richard Caborn	June 2001 – May 2005
Parliamentary Under Secretary of State	Kim Howells	June 2001 – June 2003
Parliamentary Under Secretary of State	Andrew McIntosh, Baron McIntosh of Haringey	June 2003 – May 2005

Department for Transport, Local Government and the Regions
Secretary of State for Transport, Local Government and the Regions	Stephen Byers	June 2001 – May 2002
Secretary of State for Transport	Alistair Darling	May 2002 – May 2005
Minister of State for Transport	John Spellar	June 2001 – June 2003
Minister of State for Transport	Kim Howells	June 2003 – September 2004
Minister of State for Transport	Tony McNulty	September 2004 – May 2005
Minister for Local Government	Nick Raynsford (also Minister for London)	June 2001 – May 2002
Minister for Housing and Planning	Charlie Falconer, Baron Falconer of Thoroton	June 2001 – May 2002
Parliamentary Under Secretary of State	Sally Keeble	June 2001 – May 2002
Parliamentary Under Secretary of State	Alan Whitehead	June 2001 – May 2002
Parliamentary Under Secretary of State	David Jamieson	June 2001 – May 2005
Parliamentary Under Secretary of State	Tony McNulty	June 2003 – September 2004
Parliamentary Under Secretary of State	Charlotte Atkins	September 2004 – May 2005

Department for Constitutional Affairs
Secretary of State for Constitutional Affairs	Charlie Falconer, Baron Falconer of Thoroton	June 2003 – May 2005
Parliamentary Under Secretary of State	Chris Leslie	June 2003 – May 2005
Parliamentary Under Secretary of State	David Lammy	June 2003 – May 2005
Parliamentary Under Secretary of State	Geoffrey Filkin, Baron Filkin	June 2003 – September 2004
Parliamentary Under Secretary of State	Anne McGuire (Scotland)	June 2003 – May 2005
Parliamentary Under Secretary of State	Don Touhig (Wales)	June 2003 – May 2005
Parliamentary Under Secretary of State	Catherine Ashton, Baroness Ashton of Upholland (jointly with Environment)	September 2004 – May 2005

Department of Trade and Industry
Secretary of State for Trade and Industry; President of the Board of Trade; Minister for Women	Patricia Hewitt	June 2001 – May 2005
Minister of State for E-Commerce & Competitiveness	Douglas Alexander	June 2001 – May 2002
Minister of State for E-Commerce & Competitiveness	Stephen Timms	May 2002 – September 2004
Minister of State for Energy & E-Commerce	Mike O'Brien	September 2004 – May 2005
Minister of State for Trade & Investment	Elizabeth Symons, Baroness Symons of Vernham Dean (jointly with Foreign Office)	June 2001 – June 2003
Minister of State for Trade & Investment	Mike O'Brien (jointly with Foreign Office)	June 2003 – September 2004
Minister of State for Trade & Investment	Douglas Alexander (jointly with Foreign Office)	September 2004 – May 2005
Minister of State for Industry & Energy	Brian Wilson	June 2001 – June 2003
Minister of State for Industry & Energy	Jacqui Smith (also Deputy Minister for Women)	June 2003 – May 2005
Minister of State for Employment Relations & the Regions	Alan Johnson	June 2001 – June 2003
Parliamentary Under Secretary of State for Science & Innovation	David Sainsbury, Baron Sainsbury of Turville	June 2001 – May 2005
Parliamentary Under Secretary of State for Competition, Consumers & Markets	Melanie Johnson	June 2001 – June 2003
Parliamentary Under Secretary of State for Small Business	Nigel Griffiths	June 2001 – May 2005
Parliamentary Under Secretary of State for Employment Relations & Consumer Affairs	Gerry Sutcliffe	June 2003 – May 2005

International Development
Secretary of State for International Development	Clare Short	June 2001 – May 2003
Secretary of State for International Development	Valerie Amos, Baroness Amos	May 2003 – October 2003
Secretary of State for International Development	Hilary Benn	October 2003 – May 2005
Minister of State	Hilary Benn	May 2003 – October 2003
Parliamentary Under Secretary of State	Hilary Benn	June 2001 – May 2002
Parliamentary Under Secretary of State	Sally Keeble	May 2002 – June 2003
Parliamentary Under Secretary of State	Gareth Thomas	June 2003 – May 2005

Northern Ireland Office
Secretary of State for Northern Ireland	John Reid	June 2001 – October 2002
Secretary of State for Northern Ireland	Paul Murphy	October 2002 – May 2005
Minister of State	Jane Kennedy	June 2001 – April 2004
Minister of State	John Spellar	June 2003 – May 2005
Minister of State	Ian Pearson	April 2004 – May 2005
Parliamentary Under Secretary of State	Des Browne	June 2001 – June 2003
Parliamentary Under Secretary of State	Angela Smith, Baroness Smith of Basildon	October 2002 – May 2005
Parliamentary Under Secretary of State	Ian Pearson	October 2002 – April 2004
Parliamentary Under Secretary of State	Barry Gardiner	April 2004 – May 2005

Scotland Office
Secretary of State for Scotland	Helen Liddell	June 2001 – June 2003
Secretary of State for Scotland	Alistair Darling	June 2003 – May 2005
Minister of State	George Foulkes, Baron Foulkes of Cumnock	June 2001 – May 2002
Parliamentary Under Secretary of State	Anne McGuire	May 2002 – May 2005

Wales Office
Secretary of State for Wales	Paul Murphy	June 2001 – October 2002
Secretary of State for Wales	Peter Hain	October 2002 – May 2005
Parliamentary Under Secretary of State	Don Touhig	June 2001 – May 2005

Office of the Deputy Prime Minister
Office of the Deputy Prime Minister, Secretary of State for Local Government and the Regions	John Prescott	May 2002 – May 2005
Minister of State for Local Government and the Regions	Nick Raynsford (also Minister for London May 2002 – March 2003)	May 2002 – May 2005
Minister of State for Housing and Planning	Jeff Rooker, Baron Rooker	May 2002 – June 2003
Minister of State for Housing and Planning	Keith Hill (also Minister for London)	June 2003 – May 2005
Minister for Social Exclusion, Regional Co-ordination (also Deputy Minister for Women)	Barbara Roche	May 2002 – June 2003
Minister of State for Regeneration & Regional Development	Jeff Rooker, Baron Rooker	June 2003 – May 2005
Parliamentary Under Secretary of State for Housing, Planning and Regeneration	Tony McNulty (also Minister for London March 2003 – June 2003)	May 2002 – June 2003
Parliamentary Under Secretary of State for Housing, Planning and Regeneration	Phil Hope	June 2003 – May 2005
Parliamentary Under Secretary of State for Local Government & the Regions	Chris Leslie	May 2002 – June 2003
Parliamentary Under Secretary of State for Local Government & the Regions	Yvette Cooper	June 2003 – May 2005

Lord Chancellors Department
Lord Chancellor	Derry Irvine, Baron Irvine of Lairg	June 2001 – June 2003
Parliamentary Under Secretary of State	Patricia Scotland, Baroness Scotland of Asthal	June 2001 – June 2003
Parliamentary Under Secretary of State	Michael Wills	June 2001 – May 2002
Parliamentary Under Secretary of State	Rosie Winterton	June 2001 – June 2003
Parliamentary Under Secretary of State	Yvette Cooper	May 2002 – June 2003

=== Law officers ===
Law Officers
Attorney General for England and Wales	Peter Goldsmith	June 2001 – May 2005
Solicitor General for England and Wales	Harriet Harman	June 2001 – May 2005
Advocate General for Scotland	Lynda Clark, Baroness Clark of Calton	June 2001 – May 2005
Lord Advocate	Colin Boyd, Baron Boyd of Duncansby	June 2001 – May 2005
Solicitor General for Scotland	Neil Davidson, Baron Davidson of Glen Clova	June 2001 – November 2001
Solicitor General for Scotland	Elish Angiolini	November 2001 – May 2005

=== Parliament ===
Parliament
Leader of the House of Commons	Robin Cook	June 2001 – March 2003
Leader of the House of Commons	John Reid	March 2003 – June 2003
Leader of the House of Commons	Peter Hain	June 2003 – May 2005
Deputy Leader of the House of Commons	Stephen Twigg	June 2001 – May 2002
Deputy Leader of the House of Commons	Ben Bradshaw	May 2002 – June 2003
Deputy Leader of the House of Commons	Phil Woolas	June 2003 – May 2005
Leader of the House of Lords	Gareth Williams, Baron Williams of Mostyn	June 2001 – September 2003
Leader of the House of Lords	Valerie Amos, Baroness Amos	September 2003 – May 2005
Deputy Leader of the House of Lords	Elizabeth Symons, Baroness Symons of Vernham Dean	June 2001 – May 2005

=== Whips ===
Whips
Government Chief Whip; Parliamentary Secretary to the Treasury	Hilary Armstrong	June 2001 – May 2005
Treasurer of HM Household (Deputy Chief Whip)	Keith Hill	June 2001 – June 2003
Treasurer of HM Household (Deputy Chief Whip)	Bob Ainsworth	June 2003 – May 2005
Comptroller of HM Household	Thomas McAvoy	June 2001 – May 2005
Vice-Chamberlain of the Household	Gerry Sutcliffe	June 2001 – June 2003
Vice-Chamberlain of the Household	Jim Fitzpatrick	June 2003 – May 2005
Junior Lords of the Treasury; Whips	Anne McGuire	June 2001 – May 2002
Junior Lords of the Treasury; Whips	John Heppell	June 2001 – May 2005
Junior Lords of the Treasury; Whips	Tony McNulty	June 2001 – May 2002
Junior Lords of the Treasury; Whips	Nick Ainger	June 2001 – May 2005
Junior Lords of the Treasury; Whips	Graham Stringer	June 2001 – May 2002
Junior Lords of the Treasury; Whips	Ian Pearson	May 2002 – June 2003
Junior Lords of the Treasury; Whips	Jim Fitzpatrick	May 2002 – June 2003
Junior Lords of the Treasury; Whips	Phil Woolas	May 2002 – June 2003
Junior Lords of the Treasury; Whips	Bill Rammell	Oct 2002
Junior Lords of the Treasury; Whips	Jim Murphy	June 2003 – May 2005
Junior Lords of the Treasury; Whips	Joan Ryan	June 2003 – May 2005
Junior Lords of the Treasury; Whips	Derek Twigg	June 2003 – December 2004
Junior Lords of the Treasury; Whips	Gillian Merron	December 2004 – May 2005
Assistant Whips	Ian Pearson	June 2001 – May 2002
Assistant Whips	Fraser Kemp	June 2001 – May 2005
Assistant Whips	Angela Smith, Baroness Smith of Basildon	June 2001 – October 2002
Assistant Whips	Ivor Caplin	June 2001 – June 2003
Assistant Whips	JIm Fitzpatrick	June 2001 – May 2002
Assistant Whips	Phil Woolas	June 2001 – May 2002
Assistant Whips	Dan Norris	June 2001 – June 2003
Assistant Whips	Charlotte Atkins	October 2002 – May 2005
Assistant Whips	Gillian Merron	October 2002 – December 2004
Assistant Whips	Vernon Coaker	June 2003 – May 2005
Assistant Whips	Paul Clark	June 2003 – May 2005
Assistant Whips	Margaret Moran	June 2003 – May 2005
Assistant Whips	Bridget Prentice	June 2003 – May 2005
Assistant Whips	Tom Watson	September 2004 – May 2005
Captain of the Honourable Corps of Gentlemen-at-Arms; Chief Whip	Stephen Carter, Baron Carter of Barnes	June 2001 – May 2002
Captain of the Honourable Corps of Gentlemen-at-Arms; Chief Whip	Bruce Grocott, Baron Grocott	May 2002 – May 2005
Captain of the Yeomen of the Guard; Deputy Chief Whip	Andrew McIntosh, Baron McIntosh of Haringey	June 2001 – June 2003
Captain of the Yeomen of the Guard; Deputy Chief Whip	Bryan Davies, Baron Davies of Oldham	June 2003 – May 2005
Lord and Baronesses-in-Waiting; Whips	Josie Farrington, Baroness Farrington of Ribbleton	June 2001 – May 2005
Lord and Baronesses-in-Waiting; Whips	Bryan Davies, Baron Davies of Oldham	June 2001 – June 2003
Lord and Baronesses-in-Waiting; Whips	Bruce Grocott, Baron Grocott	June 2001 – May 2002
Lord and Baronesses-in-Waiting; Whips	Geoffrey Filkin, Baron Filkin	June 2001 – May 2002
Lord and Baronesses-in-Waiting; Whips	Steve Bassam, Baron Bassam of Brighton	June 2001 – May 2005
Lord and Baronesses-in-Waiting; Whips	Christine Crawley, Baroness Crawley	January 2002 – May 2005
Lord and Baronesses-in-Waiting; Whips	Kay Andrews, Baroness Andrews	January 2002 – May 2005
Lord and Baronesses-in-Waiting; Whips	Matthew Evans, Baron Evans of Temple Guiting	June 2003 – May 2005
Lord and Baronesses-in-Waiting; Whips	David Triesman, Baron Triesman	December 2003 – May 2005

Preceded by First Blair ministry	Government of the United Kingdom; 2001–2005	Succeeded by Third Blair ministry
