= 1990 Paisley South by-election =

UK parliamentary by-election

← 1987	29 November 1990	1992 →

Constituency of Paisley South
- Turnout: 55.0% ▼20.3%
	First party	Second party
Candidate	Gordon McMaster	Iain Lawson
Party	Labour	SNP
Popular vote	12,485	7,455
Percentage	46.1%	27.5%
Swing	▼10.0%	▲13.5%
	Third party	Fourth party
Candidate	John Workman	Alan Reid
Party	Conservative	Liberal Democrats
Popular vote	3,627	2,660
Percentage	13.4%	9.8%
Swing	▼1.3%	▼5.3%
MP before election
Norman Buchan
Labour
Subsequent MP
Gordon McMaster
Labour

The 1990 Paisley South by-election was a parliamentary by-election held on 29 November 1990 for the UK House of Commons constituency of Paisley South, in the town of Paisley, Scotland.

It was caused by the death of the previous Labour Member of Parliament, Norman Buchan.

As in the by-election in the neighbouring seat of Paisley North held on the same day, the SNP saw a healthy increase in their share of the vote, but not enough to win, and the Labour Party retained the seat, with Gordon McMaster emerging as the victor.

The by-election was the first parliamentary election to take place under the premiership of John Major, who had succeeded Margaret Thatcher as Prime Minister just two days earlier. Although the change of party leader sparked an almost instant upswing in Conservative support (which had been declining for the previous 18 months largely due to the poll tax) and ultimately saw them win the 1992 general election with their highest number of votes on record, the Tories failed to take advantage of this by-election; polling at a mere 13.4% and failing to alter the political climate in a traditional Labour stronghold.

== Result ==
Paisley South by-election, 1990
Party	Candidate	Votes	%	±%
Labour	Gordon McMaster	12,485	46.1	−10.0
SNP	Iain Lawson	7,455	27.5	+13.5
Conservative	John Workman	3,627	13.4	−1.3
Liberal Democrats	Alan Reid	2,660	9.8	−5.3
Scottish Green	Lizbeth Collie	835	3.1	New
Majority		5,030	18.6	−22.5
Turnout		27,062	55.0	−20.3
Labour hold		Swing	-11.8	

== See also ==
- Paisley South (UK Parliament constituency)
- 1997 Paisley South by-election
- 1990 Paisley North by-election
- Elections in Scotland
- Lists of United Kingdom by-elections
