= Minister of State for Competitiveness =

UK government office

- Royal Arms as used by Her Majesty's Government
- Department of Trade and Industry (1997–2007); Department for Business, Enterprise and Regulatory Reform (2007–2009)
- Style: The Honourable
- Appointer: Elizabeth II
- Inaugural holder: Ian McCartney
- Formation: 12 July 2007
- Final holder: Shriti Vadera, Baroness Vadera
- Abolished: 11 May 2010

The Minister of State for Competitiveness was an office held by a member of the United Kingdom government and appointed by the prime minister of the United Kingdom.

The position was created within the Department of Trade and Industry following Tony Blair's victory in the 1997 general election and was initially held by Ian McCartney. The office was vacant between 1999 and 2001. From 2001 to 2002, it was held by Douglas Alexander and, from 2002 to 2004, by Stephen Timms; both having additional responsibility for e-Commerce.

Following Gordon Brown's election as Labour leader and Prime Minister in July 2007, the Department for Business, Enterprise and Regulatory Reform was created and the position was re-established and held again by Timms until January 2008. He was succeeded by Baroness Vadera, who served in the more junior role of Parliamentary Under-Secretary of State with additional responsibilities for small business, deregulation, the British Business Council and the Cabinet Office. She left the post in June 2009, when the Department for Business, Enterprise and Regulatory Reform was merged with the Department for Innovation, Universities and Skills.

== Ministers of State for Competitiveness 1997–2010 ==
Portrait	Name	Term of office		Political party	Government
Minister of State for Competitiveness
	Ian McCartney; MP for Makerfield	5 May 1997	28 July 1999	Labour	Blair I
Minister of State for e-Commerce and Competitiveness
	Douglas Alexander; MP for Paisley South	11 June 2001	29 May 2002	Labour	Blair II
	Stephen Timms; MP for East Ham	29 May 2002	9 September 2004	Labour	Blair II
Minister of State for Competitiveness
	Stephen Timms; MP for East Ham	12 July 2007	25 January 2008	Labour	Brown
Parliamentary Under-Secretary of State for Competitiveness, Deregulation and British Business Council (until 2009) Parliamentary Under-Secretary of State for Competitiveness and Small Business
Shriti Vadera, Baroness Vadera	Shriti Vadera, Baroness Vadera	25 January 2008	9 June 2009	Labour	Brown
