= 2022 SNP Westminster leadership election =

- 6 December 2022
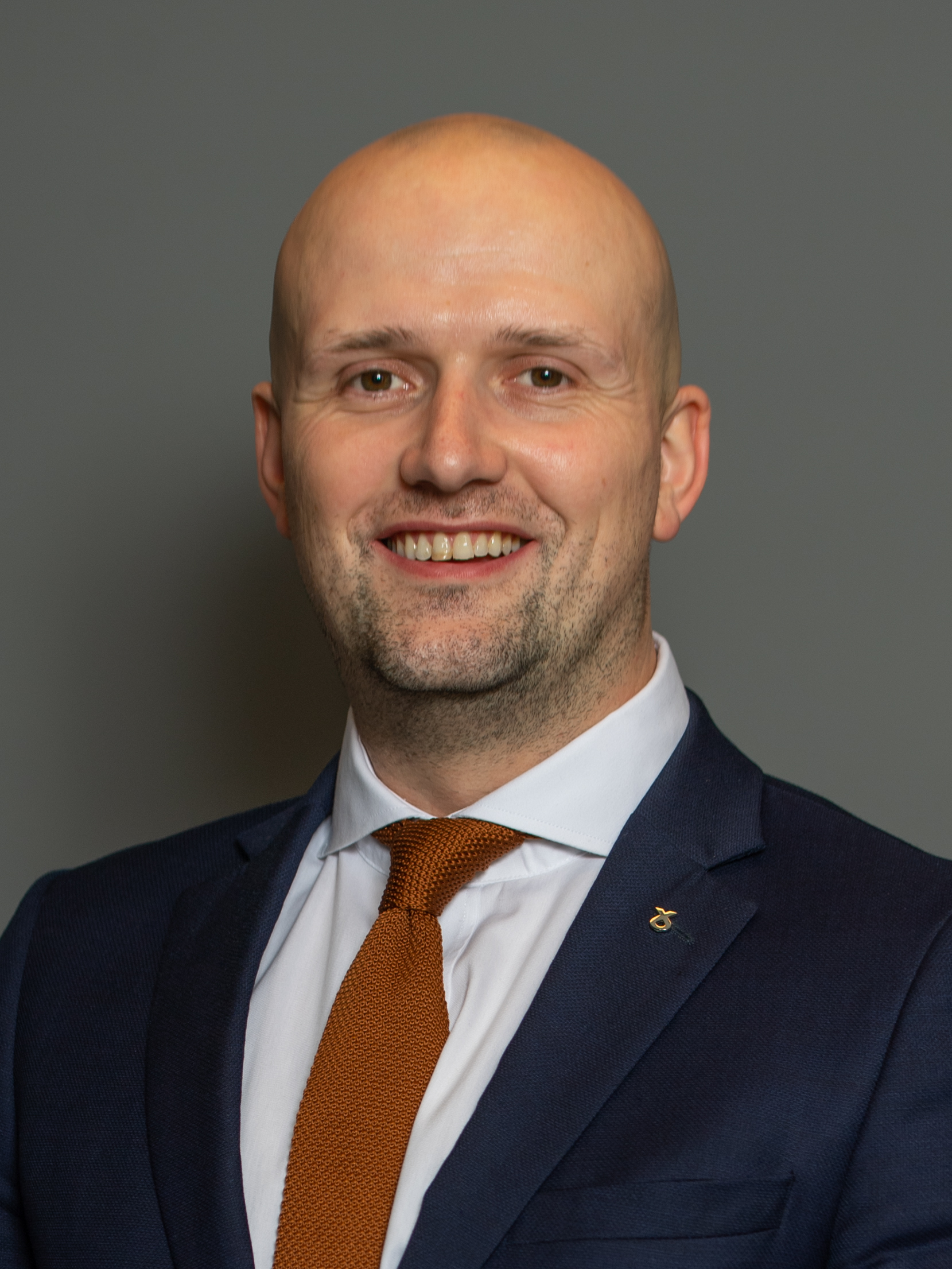

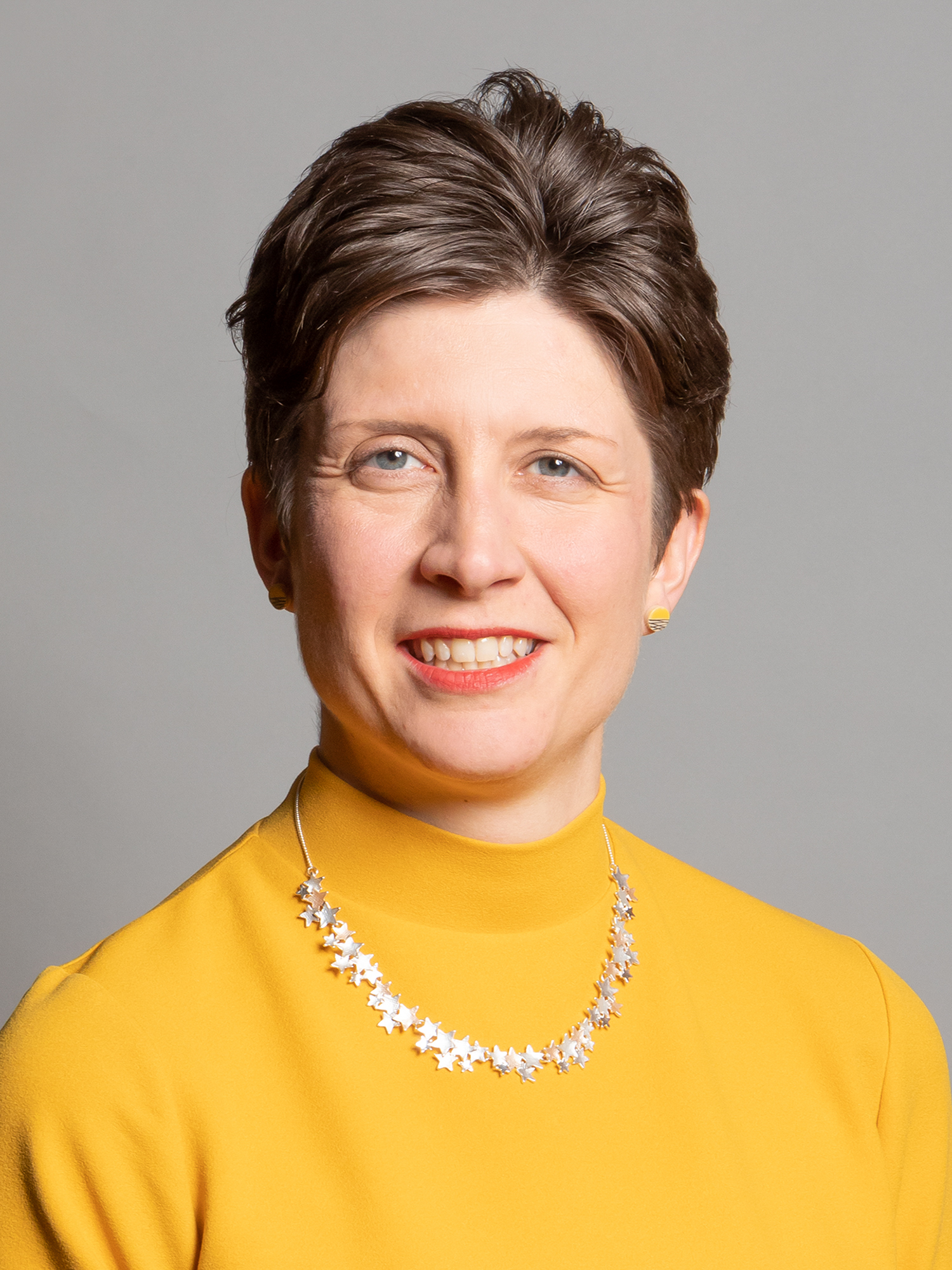
Candidate	Stephen Flynn	Alison Thewliss
Running mate	Mhairi Black	Stuart McDonald
Popular vote	26	17
Leader before election
Ian Blackford
Elected Leader
Stephen Flynn

The 2022 Scottish National Party (SNP) Westminster leadership election was held to choose the leader of the SNP in the House of Commons, following the resignation of Ian Blackford on 1 December 2022. Stephen Flynn and Alison Thewliss were the two MPs who ran in the election. Flynn was elected by 26 votes to 17.

== Background ==
In June 2017, following the 2017 General Election, where the SNP went from 56 MPs to 35, Blackford was elected as leader of the SNP Westminster Group, succeeding Angus Robertson who had lost his seat. He retained that position after the 2019 election where they regained ground, returning 48 MPs.

In February 2021, following significant public controversy, Joanna Cherry, seen as an ally of Alex Salmond, was removed from Blackford's frontbench team due to unspecified "unacceptable behaviour, which did not meet the standards expected of a front bench spokesperson".

In April 2021, a party staff member complained about Blackford's response to a sexual harassment allegation regarding SNP MP Patrick Grady. In June 2022, a recording emerged of Blackford encouraging SNP MPs to support Grady who had apologised and been suspended from the House of Commons for two days for his unwanted sexual advance to a junior SNP colleague in 2016. This comment was met with backlash from across the political spectrum and Blackford faced public calls to resign.

On 17 November 2022, it was reported that Flynn was to challenge Blackford for the leadership, which is determined annually at the AGM of the Westminster Group: Flynn denied any leadership ambition. On 23 November, the UK Supreme Court ruled that the Scottish Parliament does not have the power to legislate for an independence referendum.

Blackford announced his intention to stand down from the role on 1 December 2022. He denied being forced out by SNP MPs.

== Candidates ==
Candidate	Political office and constituency	Date declared	Ref.
Stephen Flynn	SNP Spokesperson for Business, Energy and Industrial Strategy (2021–present); MP for Aberdeen South (2019–present)	5 December 2022	
Alison Thewliss	SNP Treasury Spokesperson (2020–present); MP for Glasgow Central (2015–present)	4 December 2022	

=== Declined ===
The following SNP politicians were speculated as potential candidates for the leadership but declined to stand:

- Mhairi Black, MP for Paisley and Renfrewshire South (running for deputy leader)
- Alyn Smith, MP for Stirling

== Endorsements ==
=== Thewliss ===
- Stuart McDonald, MP for Cumbernauld, Kilsyth and Kirkintilloch East (running for deputy leader)
- Pete Wishart, MP for Perth and North Perthshire

=== Flynn ===
David Linden, MP for Glasgow East
