= Glasgow Central =

Glasgow Central can mean:

- Glasgow Central (UK Parliament constituency), a constituency of the House of Commons of the Parliament of the United Kingdom, from 1885 to 1997 and from 2005 to present
- Glasgow Central (Scottish Parliament constituency)
- Glasgow Central Railway, a railway from Maryhill to Glasgow, Scotland
- Glasgow Central station, a railway station in Glasgow, Scotland
