= Norman Buchan =

British politician (1922–1990)

Norman Findlay Buchan (27 October 1922 – 23 October 1990) was a Labour Party politician, who was on the left-wing of the party, and represented the West Renfrewshire seat from 1964 until 1983 and the Paisley South seat from 1983 until his death in 1990.

== Early life ==
A schoolteacher based in Rutherglen, he was interested in folk music, compiling a book entitled 101 Scottish Songs, often referred to as The Wee Red Book.

== Political career ==
At the 1964 Rutherglen by-election, he only lost the Labour selection meeting fairly narrowly to Gregor Mackenzie, and he went on to take West Renfrewshire from the Conservatives at the general election later that year. Whilst a Member of Parliament, he served as Joint Under Secretary of State for Scotland from 1966 to 1970, and as Minister of State for Agriculture from 1974 to 1979. He later became Shadow Minister for the Arts in opposition.

Buchan opposed an early day motion to block the televised version of Tony Harrison's poem "V" on Channel 4, saying that members who opposed the broadcast had either not read or understood the poem.

Buchan was also influential in changing the voting system for the referendum on Scottish Home Rule in the late 1970s.

During Labour's 1981 deputy leadership election, he supported John Silkin, who stood representing the political centre of the party, on the first ballot and abstained on the second ballot after Silkin was eliminated and the contest came to Tony Benn on the left and Denis Healey on the right. Buchan said: "My brain turned against Benn, but my stomach turned against Healey."

He died in 1990 (coincidentally, the MP for neighbouring Paisley North, Allen Adams, also died that year, resulting in by-elections being held on the same day for the two seats). He was succeeded as MP for Paisley South by Gordon McMaster, also of the Labour Party.

== Family ==
He was married for 44 years (1946–1990) to Janey Buchan (née Kent), Labour Member of the European Parliament for Glasgow from 1979 to 1994. She died in Brighton on 14 January 2012. His only son, Alasdair Buchan, has been a journalist since 1968.

Parliament of the United Kingdom
Preceded by John Scott Maclay	Member of Parliament for West Renfrewshire; 1964–1983	Constituency abolished
New constituency	Member of Parliament for Paisley South; 1983–1990	Succeeded by Gordon McMaster
