= Paisley South (UK Parliament constituency) =

UK Parliament constituency (1983–2005)

- Former burgh constituency for the House of Commons
- Boundary of Paisley South in Scotland for the 2001 general election
- Subdivisions of Scotland: Renfrewshire
- Major settlements: Paisley

1983–2005
- Seats: One
- Created from: Paisley, West Renfrewshire and East Renfrewshire
- Replaced by: Paisley & Renfrewshire South; Paisley & Renfrewshire North

Paisley South was a parliamentary constituency centred on the town of Paisley in Renfrewshire, Scotland. It returned one Member of Parliament (MP) to the House of Commons of the Parliament of the United Kingdom, elected by the first past the post system.

== History ==
The constituency was created when the former Paisley constituency was divided for the 1983 general election. It was abolished for the 2005 general election, when Paisley was represented by the new constituencies of Paisley & Renfrewshire South and Paisley & Renfrewshire North.

== Boundaries ==
The Renfrew District electoral divisions of Johnstone, Paisley Central, and Paisley Gleniffer.

== Members of Parliament ==
Election	Member	Party
1983	Norman Buchan	Labour
1990 by-election	Gordon McMaster	Labour Co-operative
1997 by-election	Douglas Alexander	Labour
2005	constituency abolished: see Paisley & Renfrewshire South and Paisley & Renfrewshire North	

== Election results ==
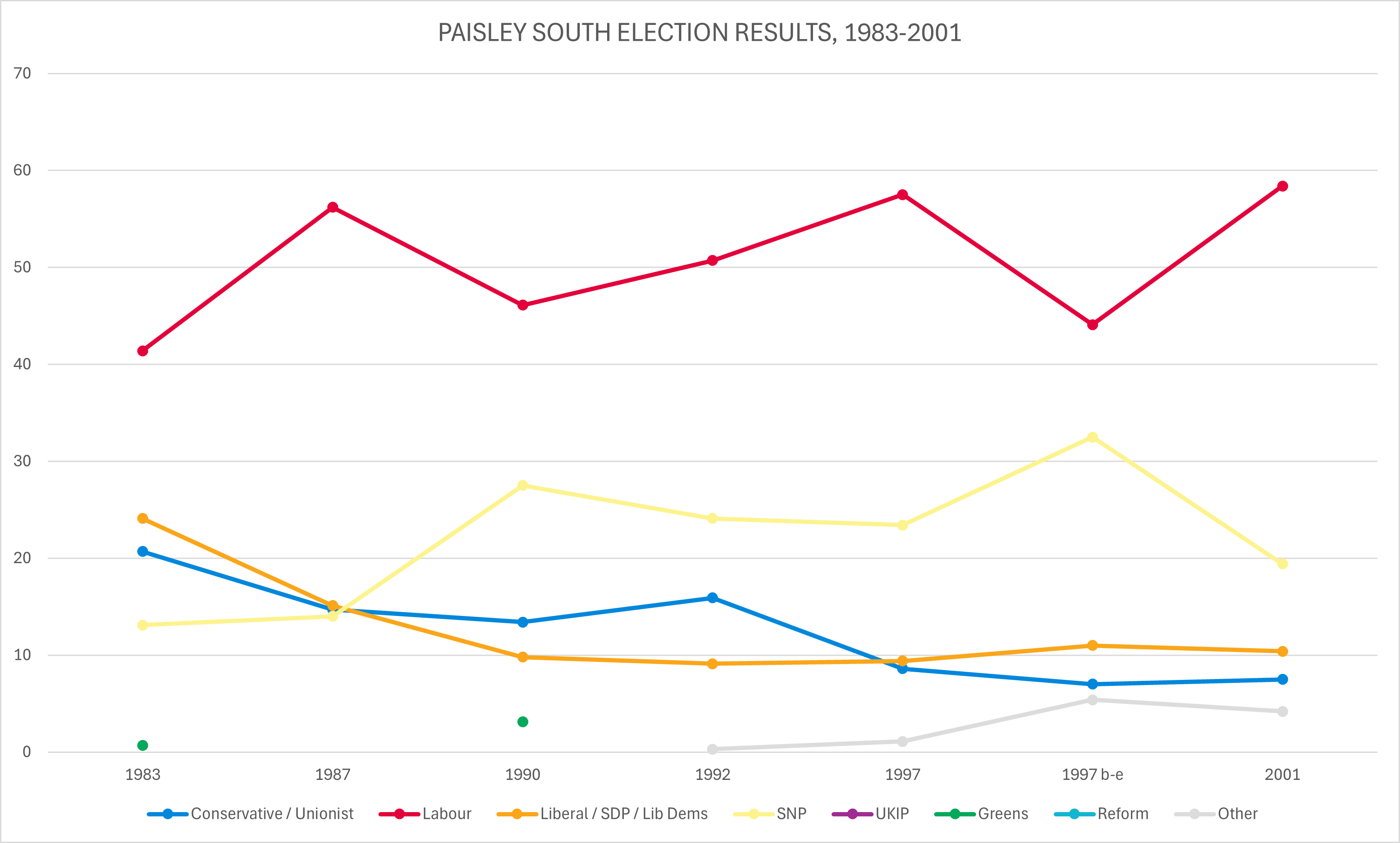
Election results 1983-2001

=== Elections of the 1980s ===
General election 1983: Paisley South
Party	Candidate	Votes	%	±%
Labour	Norman Buchan	15,633	41.4	−9.6
Liberal	Elspeth M. Buchanan	9,104	24.1	
Conservative	Joseph Knox	7,819	20.7	−9.7
SNP	James Mitchell	4,918	13.1	−4.3
Ecology	David Mellor	271	0.7	New
Majority		6,529	17.3	
Turnout		37,745	72.5	
Labour win (new seat)				

General election 1987: Paisley South
Party	Candidate	Votes	%	±%
Labour	Norman Buchan	21,611	56.2	+14.8
Liberal	Alistair Carmichael	5,826	15.1	−9.0
Conservative	Dorothy Williamson	5,644	14.7	−6.0
SNP	James Mitchell	5,398	14.0	+0.9
Majority		15,785	41.1	+23.8
Turnout		38,479	75.3	+2.8
Labour hold		Swing		

=== Elections of the 1990s ===
By-election 1990: Paisley South
Party	Candidate	Votes	%	±%
Labour Co-op	Gordon McMaster	12,485	46.1	−10.1
SNP	Iain Lawson	7,455	27.5	+13.5
Conservative	John Workman	3,627	13.4	−1.3
Liberal Democrats	Alan Reid	2,660	9.8	−5.3
Green	Elizabeth Collie	835	3.1	New
Majority		5,030	18.6	−22.5
Turnout		27,062	55.0	−20.3
Labour hold		Swing	−11.8	

General election 1992: Paisley South
Party	Candidate	Votes	%	±%
Labour Co-op	Gordon McMaster	18,202	50.7	−5.5
SNP	Iain Lawson	8,653	24.1	+10.1
Conservative	Sheila Laidlaw	5,703	15.9	+1.2
Liberal Democrats	Alan Reid	3,271	9.1	−6.0
Natural Law	Stephen Porter	93	0.3	New
Majority		9,549	26.6	−14.5
Turnout		35,922	75.0	−0.3
Labour hold		Swing		

General election 1997: Paisley South
Party	Candidate	Votes	%	±%
Labour Co-op	Gordon McMaster	21,482	57.5	+6.8
SNP	William Martin	8,732	23.4	−0.7
Liberal Democrats	Eileen McCartin	3,500	9.4	+0.3
Conservative	Robin Reid	3,237	8.6	−7.3
Referendum	James Lardner	254	0.7	New
Scottish Socialist	Sean Clerkin	146	0.4	New
Majority		12,750	34.1	+7.5
Turnout		37,351	69.1	−5.9
Labour hold		Swing		

By-Election 1997: Paisley South
Party	Candidate	Votes	%	±%
Labour	Douglas Alexander	10,346	44.1	−13.4
SNP	Ian Blackford	7,615	32.5	+9.1
Liberal Democrats	Eileen McCartin	2,582	11.0	+1.6
Conservative	Sheila Laidlaw	1,643	7.0	−1.6
ProLife Alliance	John A. Deighan	578	2.5	New
Scottish Socialist	Frances Curran	306	1.3	+0.9
Independent	Charles W. McLauchlan	155	0.7	New
Socialist Labour	Christopher Herriot	153	0.7	New
Natural Law	Kenneth R. Blair	57	0.2	New
Majority		2,731	11.6	−22.5
Turnout		23,435	42.9	−26.2
Labour hold		Swing	−11.3	

=== Elections of the 2000s ===
General election 2001: Paisley South
Party	Candidate	Votes	%	±%
Labour	Douglas Alexander	17,830	58.4	+0.9
SNP	Brian Lawson	5,920	19.4	−4.0
Liberal Democrats	Brian O’Malley	3,178	10.4	+1.0
Conservative	Andrew Cossar	2,301	7.5	−1.1
Scottish Socialist	Frances Curran	835	2.7	+2.3
ProLife Alliance	Patricia Graham	346	1.1	N/A
Independent	Terence O'Donnell	126	0.4	N/A
Majority		11,910	39.0	+4.9
Turnout		30,536	57.2	−11.9
Labour hold		Swing		

== See also ==
- Paisley South (Scottish Parliament constituency)
