= Gordon McMaster =

Scottish politician (1960–1997)

Gordon McMaster MP

Member of Parliament for Paisley South
- In office 29 November 1990 – 28 July 1997
- Preceded by: Norman Buchan
- Succeeded by: Douglas Alexander

Personal details
- Born: 13 February 1960 Johnstone, Renfrewshire, Scotland
- Died: 28 July 1997 (aged 37) Johnstone, Renfrewshire, Scotland
- Party: Labour

Gordon James McMaster (13 February 1960 – 28 July 1997) was a Scottish politician and horticulturist.

== Life and career ==
McMaster was born in Johnstone. A horticulturist by training, he was also a lecturer at his alma mater, the Woodburn House Horticultural College. McMaster was very well-liked by his students for his knowledge and charm.

In 1980, McMaster was elected to the Johnstone Community Council, and became its chair in 1982, at the age of 22, making him the youngest chair of any Scottish council. He was elected to the Renfrew District Council in 1984 and became its leader in 1987. He was elected to the House of Commons for Paisley South in a 1990 by-election, triggered by the death of Norman Buchan. In parliament, he campaigned for the rights of disabled people and against recreational drug use. He served as an opposition whip.

== Death ==
McMaster committed suicide in the garage of his home in Johnstone on 28 July 1997, at the age of 37. He had been robbed in London shortly before his death. His suicide note named neighbouring MP Tommy Graham as being responsible for smearing him over an alleged homosexual relationship with Graham's employee, 17 year old Scott Anderson. As the legal age of consent was 18 at that time, McMaster would have been accused of statutory rape. McMaster took his own life on the eve of Anderson’s 18th birthday. Graham denied being behind the leak, however was subsequently expelled from the Labour Party.

Parliament of the United Kingdom
Preceded by Norman Buchan	Member of Parliament for Paisley South; 1990–1997	Succeeded by Douglas Alexander
