= 1997 Paisley South by-election =

1997 UK Parliamentary by-election

- 6 November 1997
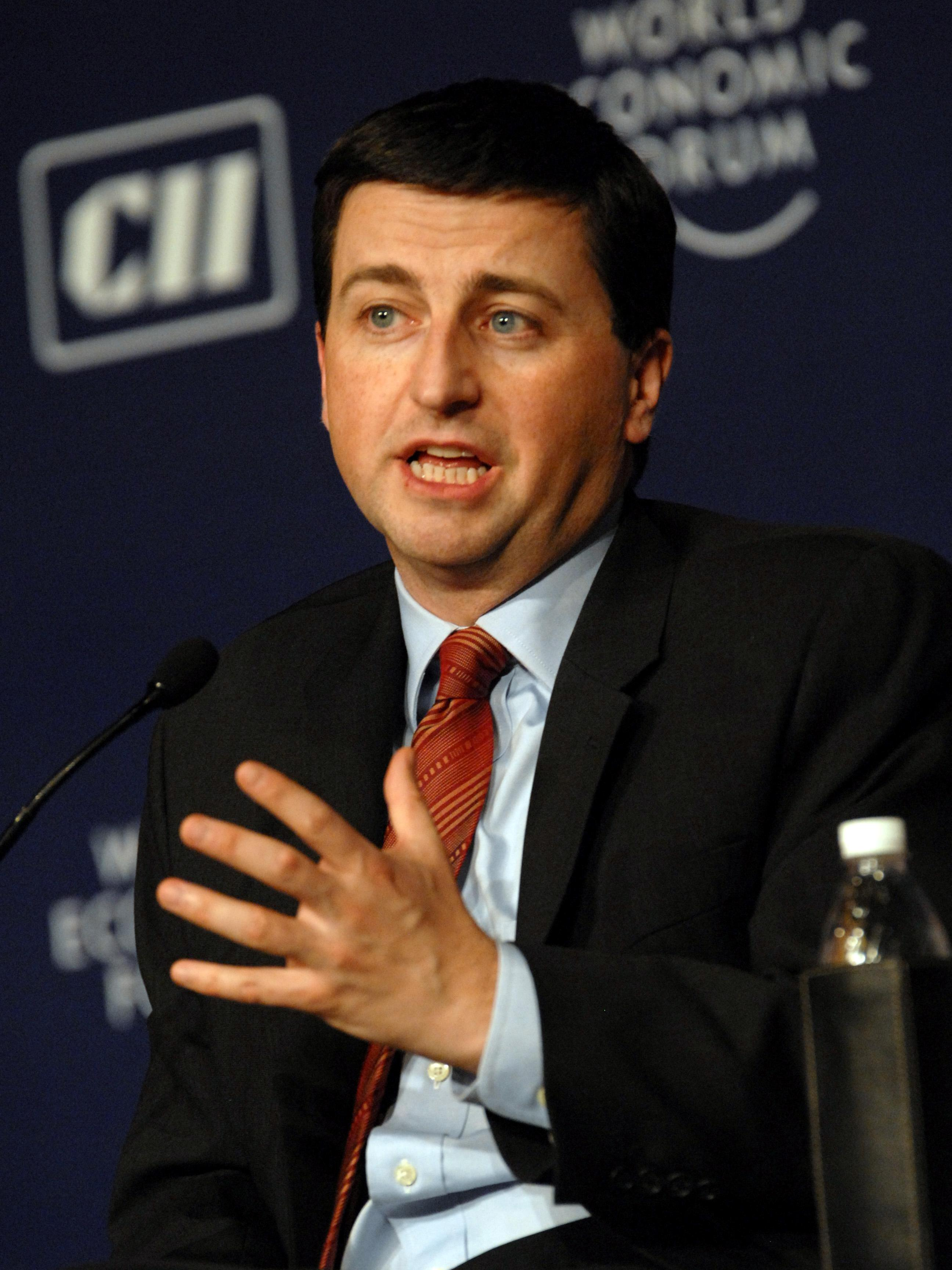

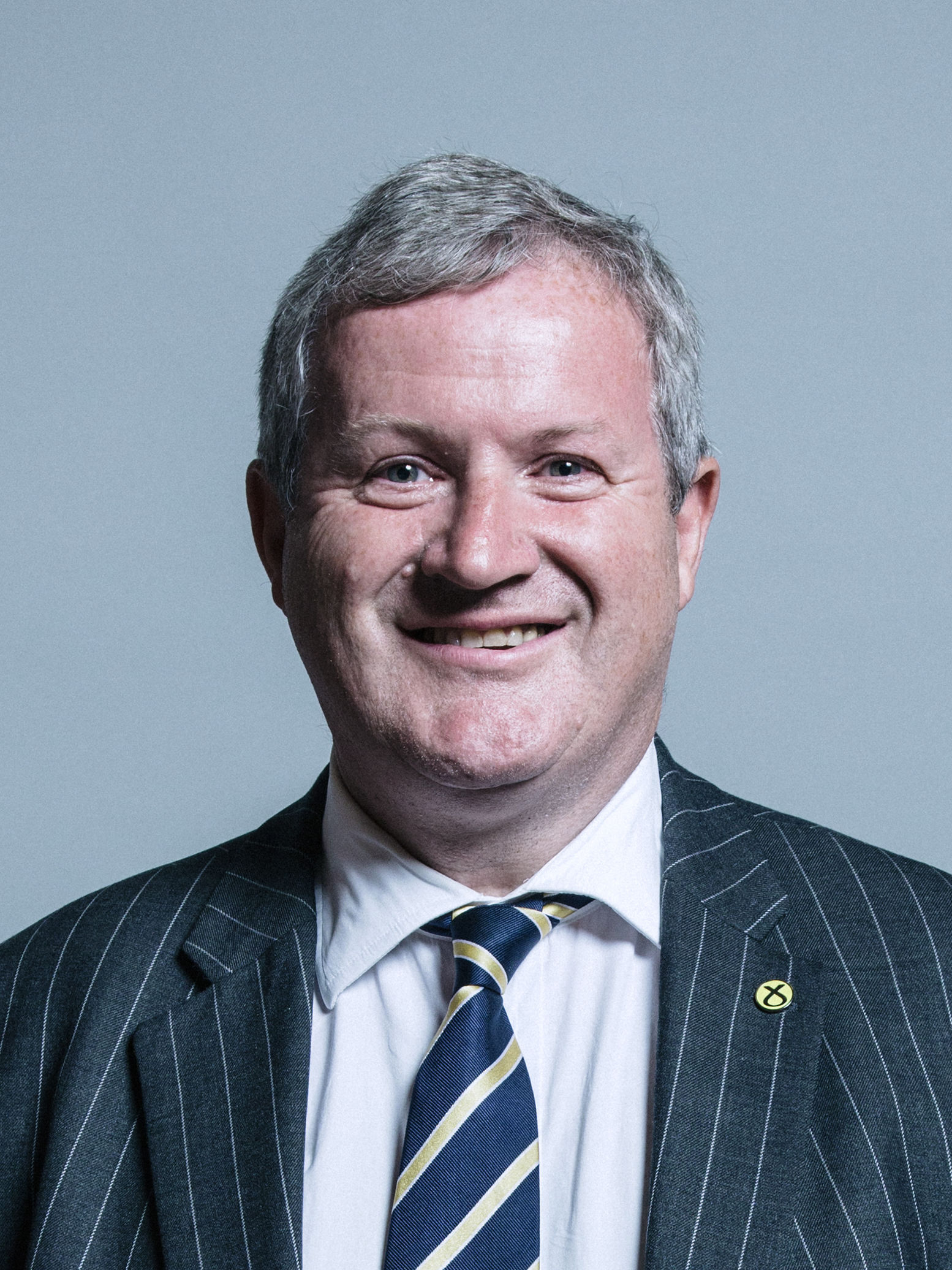
	First party	Second party
Candidate	Douglas Alexander	Ian Blackford
Party	Labour	SNP
Popular vote	10,346	7,615
Percentage	44.1%	32.5%
Swing	▼13.4%	▲9.1%
	Third party	Fourth party
Candidate	Eileen McCartin	Sheila Laidlaw
Party	Liberal Democrats	Conservative
Popular vote	2,582	1,643
Percentage	11.0%	7.0%
Swing	▲1.6%	▼1.6%
MP before election
Gordon McMaster
Labour
Elected MP
Douglas Alexander
Labour

A by-election for the United Kingdom parliamentary constituency of Paisley South was held on 6 November 1997 following the death of incumbent Member of Parliament (MP) Gordon McMaster of the Labour Party. It was won by Douglas Alexander, who retained the seat for Labour despite a swing of 11% to the Scottish National Party.

== Background ==
Gordon McMaster, the incumbent MP for the constituency, committed suicide in the garage of his home in Johnstone on 28 July 1997, at the age of 37. He had been robbed in London shortly before his death. His suicide note named neighbouring MP Tommy Graham as being responsible for smearing him over an alleged homosexual relationship with Graham's employee, 17-year-old Scott Anderson. As the legal age of consent was 18 at that time, McMaster would have been accused of statutory rape. Graham denied being behind the leak, however was subsequently expelled from the Labour Party.

== Result ==
1997 Paisley South by-election
Party	Candidate	Votes	%	±%
Labour	Douglas Alexander	10,346	44.1	−13.4
SNP	Ian Blackford	7,615	32.5	+9.1
Liberal Democrats	Eileen McCartin	2,582	11.0	+1.6
Conservative	Sheila Laidlaw	1,643	7.0	−1.6
ProLife Alliance	John Deighan	578	2.5	New
Scottish Socialist	Frances Curran	306	1.3	+0.9
Independent	C. McLauchlan	155	0.7	New
Socialist Labour	Christopher Herriot	153	0.7	New
Natural Law	Kenneth Blair	57	0.2	New
Majority		2,731	11.7	−22.4
Turnout		23,435	42.9	−26.2
Labour hold		Swing	-11.3	

== 1997 general election result ==
General Election 1997: Paisley South
Party	Candidate	Votes	%	±%
Labour	Gordon McMaster	21,482	57.5	+6.8
SNP	William Martin	8,732	23.4	−0.7
Liberal Democrats	Eileen McCartin	3,500	9.4	+0.3
Conservative	Robin Reid	3,237	8.6	−7.3
Referendum	James Lardner	254	0.7	New
Scottish Socialist	Sean Clerkin	146	0.4	New
Majority		12,750	34.1	+7.5
Turnout		37,351	69.1	−5.9
Labour hold		Swing		

== See also ==
- Elections in Scotland
- Lists of United Kingdom by-elections
