= Ian Blackford =

Scottish politician (born 1961)

The Right Honourable Ian Blackford
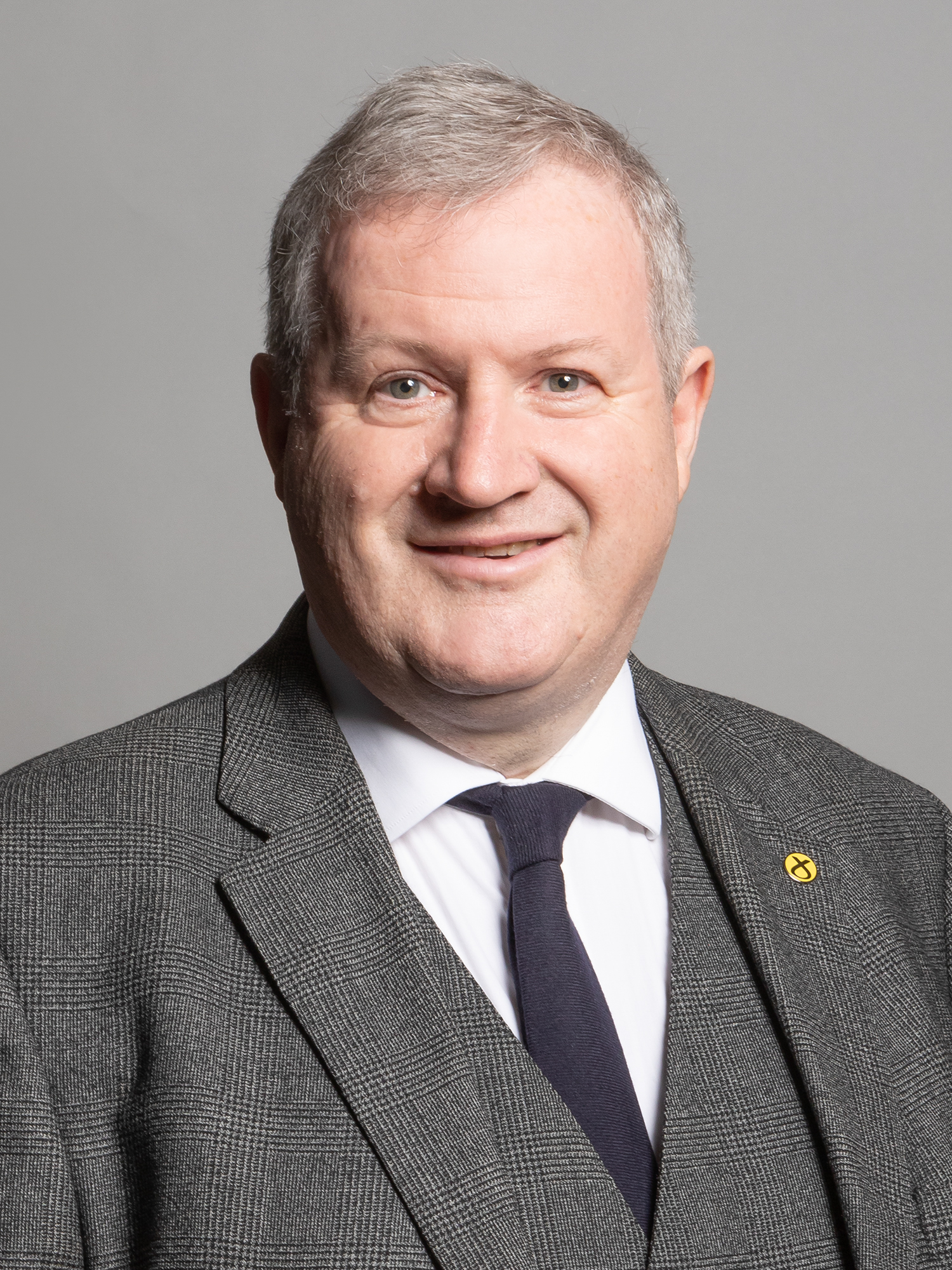
- Official portrait, 2020

Leader of the Scottish National Party in the House of Commons
- In office 14 June 2017 – 6 December 2022
- Deputy: Kirsty Blackman; Kirsten Oswald
- Leader: Nicola Sturgeon
- Preceded by: Angus Robertson
- Succeeded by: Stephen Flynn

Member of Parliament for Ross, Skye and Lochaber
- In office 7 May 2015 – 30 May 2024
- Preceded by: Charles Kennedy
- Succeeded by: Constituency abolished

Personal details
- Born: 14 May 1961 (age 65) Edinburgh, Scotland
- Party: Scottish National Party
- Spouse: Ann Yeoman (m. 2002)

Ian Blackford (born 14 May 1961) is a Scottish politician and investment banker who served as leader of the Scottish National Party (SNP) in the House of Commons from 2017 to 2022. He served as the Member of Parliament (MP) for Ross, Skye and Lochaber from 2015 to 2024.

Originally from Edinburgh, he previously worked as an investment banker and has been involved in various business ventures since. He was the national treasurer of the SNP from 1999 to 2000. Blackford became the SNP Westminster leader after Angus Robertson lost his seat at the 2017 snap general election. He stepped down from the role in December 2022 and was replaced by Stephen Flynn.

== Early life and career ==
=== Early life ===
Blackford was born in Edinburgh and educated at the Royal High School, Edinburgh.

=== Banking and business ===
Blackford worked as an analyst with NatWest Securities, before moving to a managerial role. The company was bought by BT Alex. Brown, and Blackford was a managing director. After further integration into Deutsche Bank AG in 1999, Blackford ran Deutsche Bank's equity operations in Scotland and the Netherlands. Following 20 years in the financial industry, he left to do independent consultancy work, forming an investor relations company called First Seer in 2002.

In 2005, Blackford joined the Dutch food and biochemicals company CSM as an investor relations manager. He was appointed non-executive chairman of the Edinburgh-based telecommunications firm Commsworld in 2006, having joined the board as a non-executive director in 2005. He is a trustee at the Golden Charter Trust. In 2013, he helped explain the business case for not closing a primary school in Milngavie when East Dunbartonshire Council had proposed closure. Blackford was the chairman of Commsworld plc, a telecoms company, until 2019. The sale of the business to Lloyds Development Capital at this time is reported to have made Blackford a seven-figure sum.

=== Glendale Trust ===
He was previously the chairman of the Glendale Trust, an organisation responsible for a community-owned estate on Skye, which made an approach to Highland Council to bring a historic pier under community control. Under his chairmanship, support was secured for establishing a heritage centre in 2010. He had also been a member of the FlySkye group, campaigning to bring commercial air services back to Skye.

== Early political career ==
Blackford stood as the SNP candidate for the Ayr constituency at the 1997 general election, but finished in third place behind Sandra Osborne of the Labour Party.

Later during the same year, he stood as the Scottish National Party (SNP) candidate in the Paisley 1997 by-election but again he was unsuccessful; the contest had the lowest turnout at a by-election in Scotland for thirty years.

Blackford had been treasurer of the SNP and during this time he began to be viewed as a critic of the party leader, Alex Salmond. Blackford was removed from the post in 2000 via a vote of no confidence, after he had tried to impose financial controls to tackle the party's overdraft. However, the limits for expenditure which he set were not adhered to. Blackford's reputedly hard line over financial matters had led to a breakdown of trust between him and the national executive and at one point he even threatened to sue party leader, Alex Salmond, for defamation. A profile in Holyrood magazine opined that, "Blackford's mistake was firstly, in underestimating the popularity of Salmond and the size of his power base and secondly, in committing the cardinal sin of washing the party's dirty washing in public and not keeping it 'within the family'." His opinion of Salmond mellowed after his election to Westminster and in August 2018 he said: "I don't hate Alex. He has been instrumental in getting us to where we are today... So we owe a tremendous debt of gratitude to Alex."

Blackford has argued for better telecommunication infrastructure for rural areas, noting that video-conferencing is one way of overcoming travel time and in the absence of air links. Following the 2008 financial crisis, he made calls for Scotland to have its own financial regulator, to protect society from irresponsible practices. Blackford has also suggested that a zero rate of capital gains tax could help Scotland to attract investment.

Following the electorate's decision to reject independence at the referendum on 18 September 2014, Blackford argued that Scotland should consider the constitutional change offered by the main unionist parties. He was the author of a report which had explored options for the banking sector in Scotland, had the country voted to become independent.

== Member of Parliament ==
=== Election ===
In January 2015, it was announced that Blackford would be the SNP candidate for Ross, Skye and Lochaber at the 2015 general election. The campaign attracted national attention because of its acrimony; Blackford objected to being called a "well-funded banker" and confronted incumbent MP Charles Kennedy in his office. Liberal Democrats accused Blackford of dog whistling about Kennedy's struggles with alcoholism. Leaflets were distributed telling voters "Why bottle it? Make a Change!", but the SNP denied responsibility for their distribution and condemned them. Former Liberal Democrat leader Menzies Campbell labelled the campaign, "far and away the most despicable I encountered in all my years in UK politics." However, Blackford said he was "proud" of the campaign and claimed there was "absolutely no issue" between himself and Kennedy before his death in June 2015. He received 20,119 votes and 48.1% of the vote, defeating Kennedy by 5,124 votes.

Blackford was re-elected in 2017 with a smaller share of the vote but an increased majority.

=== SNP Westminster leader ===
He was re-elected at the 2017 general election. On 14 June 2017, he was elected as leader of the SNP Westminster Group, succeeding Angus Robertson who had lost his seat. Upon election, he chose not to take a £33,000 increase to his salary Robertson had taken, instead sending that money to staff wages. On 19 July he was appointed a member of the Privy Council. Additionally, he has served as a member of the secret Intelligence and Security Committee, which scrutinises the work of Britain's intelligence agencies. On 25 April 2019 it was reported that he had "stood down" from this role, to be "replaced by Stewart Hosie".

Blackford announced his revised frontbench team on 7 January 2020, following the 2019 general election.

In November 2020 during the COVID-19 pandemic, Blackford was accused of making an Anglophobic attack against an English-born photographer living in Scotland: Blackford falsely accused Ollie Taylor of breaching pandemic travel restrictions after he posted a photograph of the Northern Lights at Caithness on his Twitter profile, claiming that he lived in the south of England. Taylor had in fact moved to Caithness earlier in 2020. Other Twitter users accused Blackford of trying to organise a "pile on". Scottish Liberal Democrats leader Willie Rennie accused Blackford of bullying a private citizen and stoking anti-English sentiment in Scotland. Blackford apologised for his claims but insisted that he would "continue to stand up for my constituents" who "feel very strongly about the breaking of travel restrictions that we see across the Highlands and islands" (Blackford's constituency did not include Caithness). When questioned on Blackford's actions in the Scottish Parliament, First Minister and SNP leader Nicola Sturgeon said Blackford had "acted with grace and dignity".

In April 2021, an SNP staff member complained about Blackford's handling of a sexual harassment allegation regarding SNP MP Patrick Grady. The man alleged that after reporting the incident, Blackford invited him to an "ambush" meeting at which Grady was present, and where he claims he felt obliged to accept an apology from Grady. Blackford denies the meeting occurred as described. The SNP stated it would be investigated.

In June 2022, Grady apologised for the behaviour in parliament after a full independent investigation and was suspended from the House of Commons for two-days over his unwanted sexual advance to a junior SNP colleague in 2016. Following this, a video emerged of Blackford encouraging SNP MPs to provide Grady with "full support" This comment was met with backlash from across the political spectrum and Blackford faced calls to resign. On 25 June 2022, Grady left the SNP whip; it was restored six months later by Blackford's successor.

Blackford announced his intention to stand down from leadership of the SNP Westminster group on 1 December 2022, ahead of the group's AGM. He denied being forced out by SNP MPs. His successor, Stephen Flynn, was elected on 6 December. On 6 June 2023, Blackford announced that he would not seek re-election as an MP at the next general election, which subsequently took place in July 2024.

==== PMQs ====
On 13 June 2018, Blackford was ejected from the House of Commons by the then-Speaker John Bercow. Blackford had raised a question to Prime Minister Theresa May regarding the issues of no Scottish MP being given time to debate the Scotland-related areas of the EU Withdrawal Bill the previous night and also wanting the chamber to immediately have a vote on the motion to sit in private. Blackford was irate in asking the question and was instructed numerous times by Bercow to resume his seat so the Prime Minister could answer his question. Blackford refused to do this, claiming that "Scotland's voice [was] not being heard". Eventually, Bercow used Standing Order 43 (issued for grossly disorderly conduct) to eject Blackford from the chamber, which Blackford complied with, followed by almost every SNP MP. This was the first time that any such incident as this had ever occurred during Prime Minister's Questions. The incident was broadcast on live television on the BBC and Sky News.

On 31 January 2022, Blackford was ordered to withdraw from the House of Commons for the remainder of the sitting day, by the Speaker Lindsay Hoyle, also under Standing Order 43, after he repeatedly stated that Boris Johnson had misled the House in a debate on Partygate, a violation of rules which prohibit MPs from accusing each other of lying within the House of Commons. He also refused to qualify his remarks to state that the misleading was "inadvertent".

=== Other interests ===
Blackford, an investment banker, described himself as "just a simple crofter with 10 acres" in the 2018 Westminster Budget debate. He was mocked by other MPs, with Anna Soubry remarking that the house belonging to the "simple crofter" was valued at somewhere in the region of £500,000.

In addition to his work as an MP, Blackford has also worked part-time for funeral planners Golden Charter Trust Limited. Between April 2020 and March 2021 he was paid £38,967 by the company; from December 2015 to April 2020, he was paid £3,000 per month by Golden Charter Trust. In September 2020 Blackford announced that his association with the company would end in a "timely manner" in March 2021. He previously earned an additional £1,000 a month serving as chairman of Commsworld - a telecoms business in which he owned circa £70,000 worth of shares.

He employs his stepson as a Senior Caseworker. After his stepson was awarded a £7,500 pay rise, the issue of MPs hiring their relatives was the subject of a leader comment in The Scotsman: "[T]he issue here is the inference of nepotism. While Ian Blackford may be within his rights to raise his relative's wages, the practice of hiring relations has to come to an end because it does nothing to dissuade a distrusting public that MPs - post expenses scandal - only ever look out for themselves."

== Personal life ==
Blackford was married to Ann Yeoman. Blackford and Yeoman separated in 2023 after Blackford began a relationship with Kim Lyons, a married woman who he has known since childhood. He is a supporter of Hibernian F.C.

Blackford is a member of the Free Church of Scotland, but has had some disagreements with them by voting for abortion rights and same-sex marriage.

Party political offices
Preceded by Kenny MacAskill	Treasurer of the Scottish National Party; 1999–2000	Succeeded by Jim Mather
Preceded by Angus Robertson	Leader of the Scottish National Party in the House of Commons; 2017–2022	Succeeded by Stephen Flynn
Parliament of the United Kingdom
Preceded by Charles Kennedy	Member of Parliament for Ross, Skye and Lochaber; 2015–2024	Constituency abolished
