= Douglas Alexander =

British politician (born 1967)

The Right Honourable Douglas Alexander MP
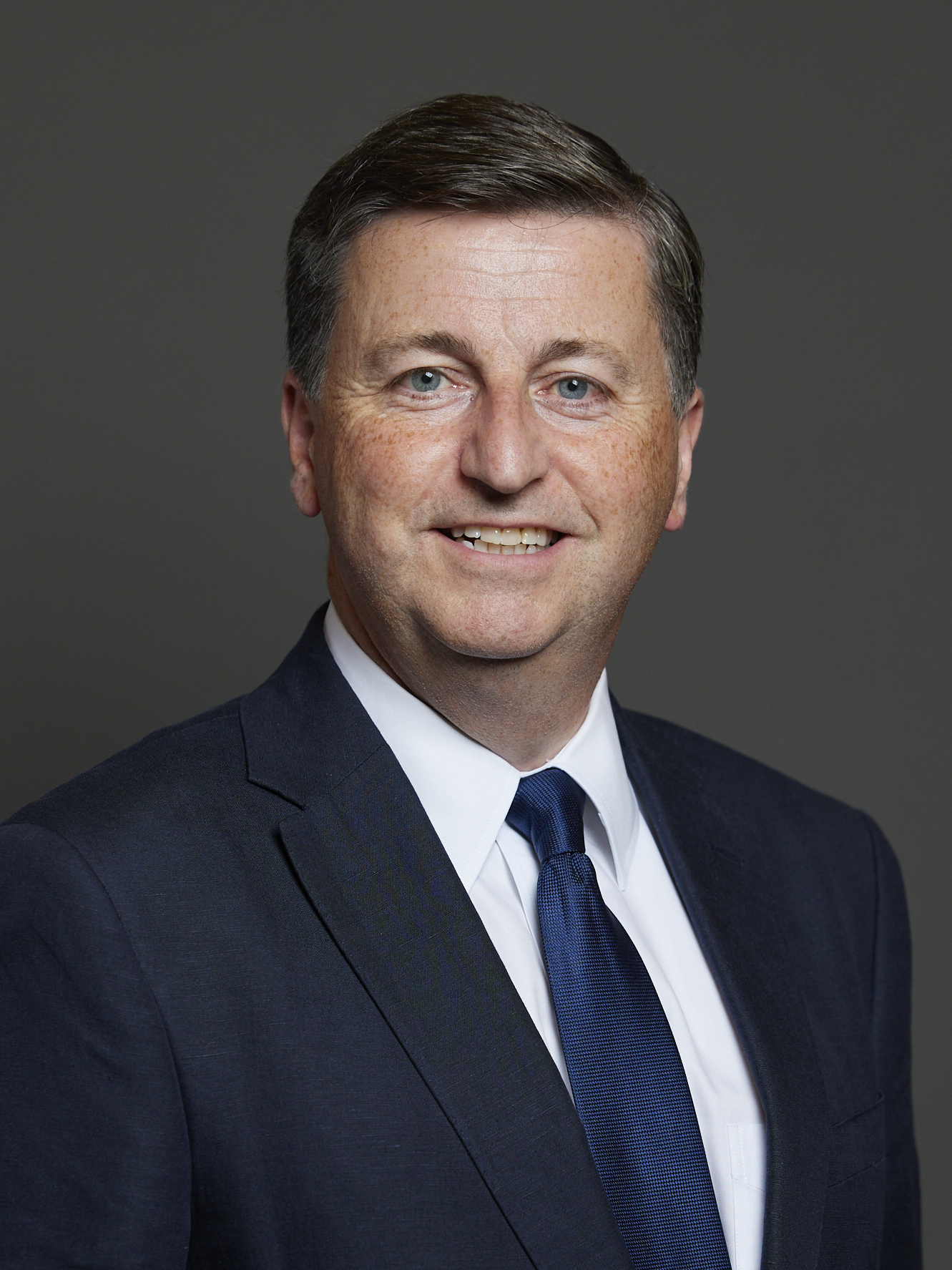
- Official portrait, 2024

Secretary of State for Scotland
- Incumbent
- Assumed office 5 September 2025
- Prime Minister: Keir Starmer; Andy Burnham
- Preceded by: Ian Murray
- In office 6 May 2006 – 28 June 2007
- Prime Minister: Tony Blair
- Preceded by: Alistair Darling
- Succeeded by: Des Browne
Ministerial offices 2001‍–‍2010, 2024‍–‍2025
Minister of State at the Cabinet Office
In office 10 February 2025 – 5 September 2025
| Prime Minister | Keir Starmer |
| Preceded by | The Baroness Neville-Rolfe (2024) |
| Succeeded by | Dan Jarvis |
Minister of State for Trade Policy and Economic Security (Note: As Minister of State for Trade (2004–2005))
In office 6 July 2024 – 5 September 2025
| Prime Minister | Keir Starmer |
| Preceded by | Greg Hands |
| Succeeded by | Chris Bryant |
In office 8 September 2004 – 5 May 2005
| Prime Minister | Tony Blair |
| Preceded by | Mike O'Brien |
| Succeeded by | Ian Pearson |
Secretary of State for International Development
In office 28 June 2007 – 11 May 2010
| Prime Minister | Gordon Brown |
| Preceded by | Hilary Benn |
| Succeeded by | Andrew Mitchell |
Secretary of State for Transport
In office 6 May 2006 – 28 June 2007
| Prime Minister | Tony Blair |
| Preceded by | Alistair Darling |
| Succeeded by | Ruth Kelly |
Minister of State for Europe
In office 5 May 2005 – 6 May 2006
| Prime Minister | Tony Blair |
| Preceded by | Denis MacShane |
| Succeeded by | Geoff Hoon |
Minister for the Cabinet Office Chancellor of the Duchy of Lancaster
In office 13 June 2003 – 8 September 2004
| Prime Minister | Tony Blair |
| Preceded by | The Lord Macdonald of Tradeston |
| Succeeded by | Alan Milburn |
Minister of State for the Cabinet Office
In office 29 May 2002 – 13 June 2003
| Prime Minister | Tony Blair |
| Preceded by | Barbara Roche |
| Succeeded by | David Miliband (2004) |
Minister of State for e-Commerce and Competitiveness
In office 11 June 2001 – 29 May 2002
| Prime Minister | Tony Blair |
| Preceded by | Ian McCartney (1999) |
| Succeeded by | Stephen Timms |
Shadow cabinet portfolios
| 2011–2015 | Shadow Foreign Secretary |
| 2010–2011 | Work and Pensions Secretary |
| 2010–2010 | International Development Secretary |

Member of Parliament
- Incumbent
- Assumed office 4 July 2024
- Preceded by: Kenny MacAskill
- Constituency: Lothian East
- Majority: 13,265 (27.7%)
- In office 6 November 1997 – 30 March 2015
- Preceded by: Gordon McMaster
- Succeeded by: Mhairi Black
- Constituency: Paisley South (1997–2005); Paisley and Renfrewshire South (2005–2015)

Personal details
- Born: Douglas Garven Alexander; 26 October 1967 (age 59) Glasgow, Scotland
- Party: Labour Co-op
- Spouse: Jacqueline Christian (m. 2000)
- Relations: Wendy Alexander (sister)
- Children: 2
- Education: University of Edinburgh (MA, LLB)

Douglas Garven Alexander (born 26 October 1967) is a Scottish politician who has served as Secretary of State for Scotland since 2025, having previously held the position from 2006 to 2007. A member of the Labour Party, he has been Member of Parliament (MP) for Lothian East since 2024. He was previously MP for Paisley and Renfrewshire South, formerly Paisley South, from 1997 to 2015 and served in the cabinets of Tony Blair and Gordon Brown, lastly as International Development Secretary from 2007 to 2010.

Born in Glasgow, Alexander attended Park Mains High School and then won a scholarship for Lester B. Pearson United World College of the Pacific in Canada. He studied at the University of Edinburgh and spent a year at the University of Pennsylvania where he worked for Michael Dukakis on his 1988 presidential campaign. He returned to the University of Edinburgh to study for an LLB, before working shadow trade secretary Gordon Brown in 1990. Alexander then qualified and worked as a solicitor. He was first elected to Parliament at the 1997 Paisley South by-election. In 2001, he was appointed by Tony Blair as Minister of State for e-Commerce and Competitiveness in the Department of Trade and Industry. He was Minister of State for the Cabinet Office from 2002 to 2003. In 2003, he was promoted to Minister for the Cabinet Office and Chancellor of the Duchy of Lancaster. In 2004, he was appointed Minister of State for Trade. Following the 2005 general election, he was appointed Minister of State for Europe and made a member of the Privy Council. During this period, he started attending cabinet. In 2006, he was appointed to serve jointly as both Secretary of State for Scotland and Secretary of State for Transport. In 2007, when Gordon Brown became Prime Minister, he appointed Alexander as Secretary of State for International Development.

After Labour lost the 2010 general election Alexander co-chaired David Miliband's leadership campaign. When Ed Miliband became the party's leader, Alexander was elected to the Shadow cabinet and was made the Shadow Secretary of State for Work and Pensions. He held this position until a 2011 reshuffle, when he was appointed Shadow Foreign Secretary. In October 2013, he was appointed by Miliband as the party's chair of general election strategy. In 2015, he lost his seat to 20 year-old Mhairi Black of the Scottish National Party, in what was one of the worst results for Labour; with forty seats lost to the SNP nationwide. After leaving Parliament, Alexander worked as a professor for various universities, as a Council Member on the European Council on Foreign Relations, in broadcasting, and as chair of the board of trustees for UNICEF UK from 2018 to 2020.

In December 2022, Alexander sought out a return to Parliament by applying to be Labour's parliamentary candidate for East Lothian, held by the Alba Party's Kenny MacAskill. He won the selection to stand for the Labour and Co-operative parties in the constituency in February 2023 and was elected as the MP for the redrawn Lothian East constituency in July 2024. He returned to government as minister of state for trade policy and was additionally appointed Minister of State at the Cabinet Office in February 2025. He was promoted to Scotland Secretary in the 2025 cabinet reshuffle and reappointed by Andy Burnham in July 2026.

== Early life and career ==
Alexander was born in Glasgow, the son of Joyce Oliver Alexander (née Garven), a doctor, and Douglas Niven Alexander, a Church of Scotland minister. Much of his childhood was spent in Bishopton in Renfrewshire. Alexander attended his local comprehensive school Park Mains High School in Erskine, also in Renfrewshire, from where he joined the Labour Party as a schoolboy in 1982.

In 1984 he won a Scottish scholarship to attend Lester B. Pearson United World College of the Pacific in Canada, where he gained the International Baccalaureate Diploma, returning to Scotland to study politics and modern history at the University of Edinburgh. He spent 1988/89, the third of his four undergraduate years, at the University of Pennsylvania as part of the exchange scheme between the two universities. When studying in America, he worked for Michael Dukakis during the 1988 American presidential election campaign, and also worked for a Democratic senator in Washington DC. He graduated from the University of Edinburgh with a first-class degree in 1990.

In 1990, Alexander worked as a speech writer and parliamentary researcher for Shadow Trade and Industry Secretary Gordon Brown. He returned to Edinburgh to study for an LLB at the University of Edinburgh, where he won the Novice Moot Trophy and graduated with distinction in 1993. He then qualified as a Scottish solicitor. On qualifying as a solicitor, he worked for a firm of solicitors in Edinburgh that provided legal services to Trade Union members and specialised in industrial injury cases.

== Political career ==
=== Perth and Kinross ===
Whilst still studying in 1995 and with friends in the local Constituency Labour Party and the backing of his mentor shadow chancellor Gordon Brown, he was selected to be The Labour Party in Scotland candidate at the Perth and Kinross by-election caused by the death of the Conservative MP Nicholas Fairbairn. The by-election in the highly volatile Tory seat of Perth and Kinross came in the middle of the John Major government and was won by Roseanna Cunningham of the Scottish National Party, but Alexander received enough votes to push the Conservative candidate into third place. It was a seat where Labour had never previously done particularly well, and the result, which saw Labour overtake the Conservatives and move up to second place, broke several post war election records. This brought him to the attention of party leader Tony Blair, and shortly after his defeat by the SNP he was welcomed at The Labour Party in Scotland Conference in the Eden Court Theatre in Inverness where he spoke immediately before Blair in the critical debate on abolition of Clause IV of the Labour Party Constitution.

When the Perth and Kinross constituency was abolished, Alexander was chosen to be the Labour candidate in the newly drawn Perth constituency at the 1997 general election. Once again, Labour achieved a further swing with Alexander securing 24.8% share of the vote compared to 22.9% achieved during the 1995 by-election, though pushed into third place.

=== Member of Parliament ===
On 28 July 1997, Gordon McMaster, the Labour Member of Parliament for Paisley South, committed suicide. Alexander, who grew up in Renfrewshire, was chosen to contest the by-election and he was elected to serve as the Member of Parliament for Paisley South on 6 November 1997. In June 2001 he was returned to Westminster with an increased majority. Following the general election in May 2005 Alexander was re-elected, becoming MP for the new constituency of Paisley and Renfrewshire South, as well as promoted to Minister of State for Europe attending Cabinet at the Foreign Office. At the 2010 General Election Alexander was re-elected for Paisley and Renfrewshire South with a majority of 13,232 votes. He lost his seat to 20-year-old Mhairi Black of the Scottish National Party at the general election on 8 May 2015 with a swing against him of 26.9%.

=== Minister of state ===
Alexander took a successful co-ordinating role in his party's campaign for the 2001 general election. He was rewarded by Tony Blair and was appointed Minister of State for e-Commerce and Competitiveness at the Department of Trade and Industry in June 2001. In May 2002, Alexander was transferred to the Cabinet Office as Minister of State. As Minister of State for the Cabinet Office, Alexander oversaw the work of the government's Strategy Unit, the Central Office of Information, and the Civil Service.

In June 2003 Alexander was promoted to Minister for the Cabinet Office and Chancellor of the Duchy of Lancaster, and in September 2004 was moved to Minister of State for Trade at both the Department of Trade and Industry and the Foreign and Commonwealth Office.

=== Cabinet minister ===
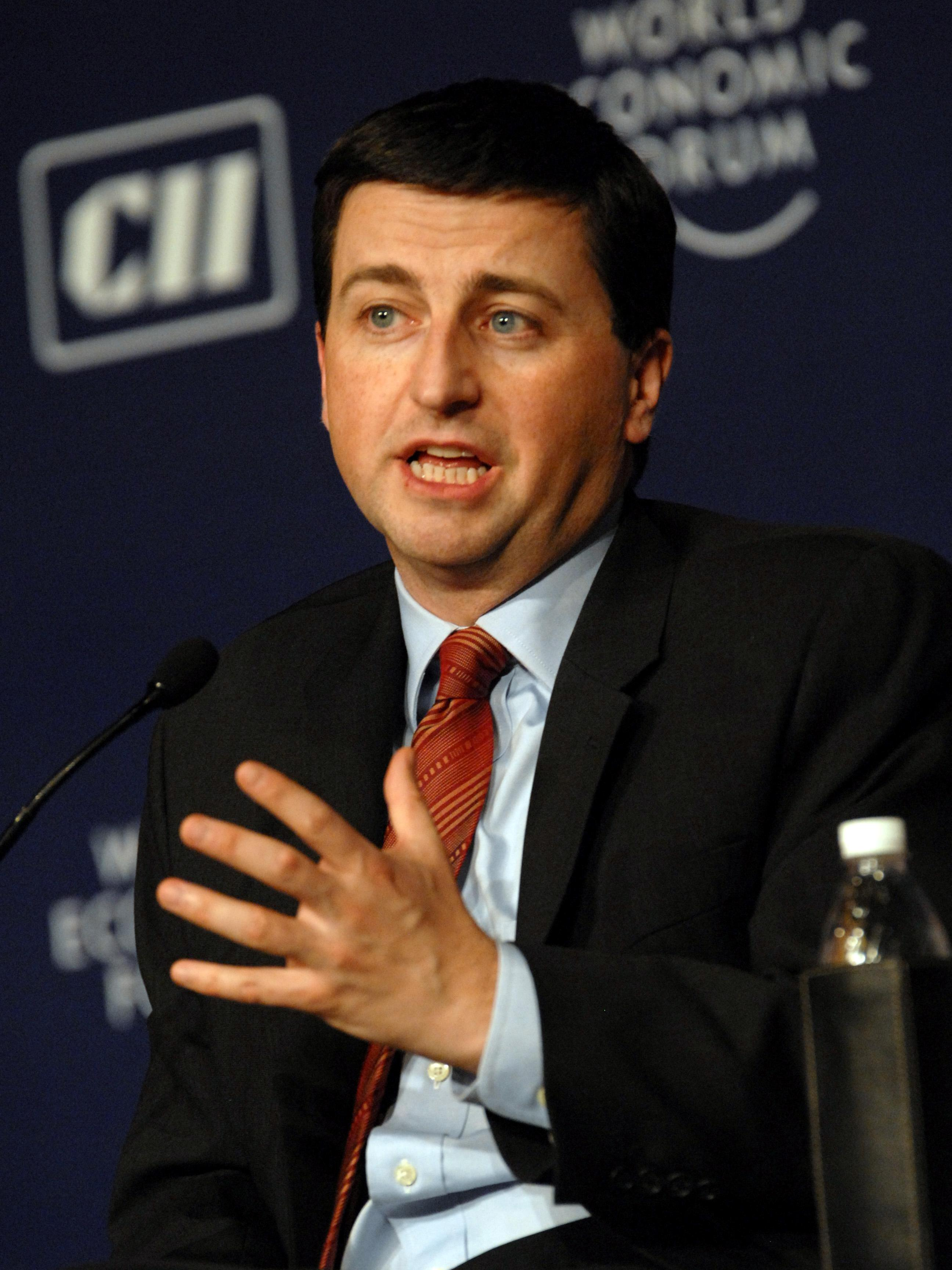
Alexander at the India Economic Summit, 2008

Following the 2005 general election, he was given the role of Minister of State for Europe, part of the Foreign Office, with special provision to attend Cabinet. During the United Kingdom's Presidency of the Council of the European Union, he contributed directly to successful negotiations on agreement of the Multiannual Financial Framework. On 7 June 2005, he was made a Member of the Privy Council.

On 5 May 2006, he was appointed Secretary of State for Transport and, simultaneously, Secretary of State for Scotland, replacing Alistair Darling. On 10 August 2006, Alexander was helicoptered by the Royal Air Force from Scotland to London to join Home Secretary John Reid, in leading the UK Government's response to the 2006 transatlantic aircraft plot and attend meetings of COBRA, the government emergencies committee. He worked with police, Intelligence Agencies, the Airlines and the US Department of Homeland Security.

During his time as Scottish Secretary, Alexander oversaw the running of the 2007 Scottish Parliament election. Following Gordon Brown's appointment as Prime Minister on 27 June 2007, he appointed Douglas Alexander as Secretary of State for International Development. During this time Alexander served as a governor of the World Bank, the African Development Bank, the Inter-American Development Bank the Caribbean Development Bank, and the Asian Development Bank.

=== Election campaign roles ===
Alexander took a central role in the first Scottish Parliament elections in 1999 which saw Donald Dewar elected as the first First Minister of Scotland. Alexander is credited with devising the strategy for the campaign, including the successful 'Divorce is an Expensive Business' messaging unveiled at the Labour Party in Scotland Conference in Glasgow (March 1999). Labour secured 56 seats under the Proportional Representation system, nine short of an overall majority, and agreed to enter a coalition with the 17-strong Liberal Democrats to form the first Government in the newly established Scottish Parliament. Alexander also coordinated Labour's successful 2001 General Election Campaign which resulted in another Labour landslide and the Party winning 413 of the 659 seats available: securing a 167-seat majority in the House of Commons. Alexander was appointed by Tony Blair to Labour's National Executive Committee in 2003 and was appointed by Gordon Brown to be Labour's General Election Coordinator for the 2010 general election campaign. This campaign saw the first televised Leaders' debates, and Alexander was part of the core team preparing Gordon Brown for each debate, as well as devising the strategy and messaging for the campaign across the UK which would ultimately deny David Cameron's Conservatives a Majority in May 2010. Later in that year Alexander accepted the role as co-chair of David Miliband's campaign for the leadership of the Labour party. He subsequently was Ed Miliband's chair of general election strategy for the Labour 2015 general election campaign.

=== Opposition to antisemitism ===
In September 2012 Alexander gave an interview to the Evening Standard newspaper criticising Ken Livingstone's election campaign and calling out anti-Semitic comments made by the former London Mayor. He said Livingstone paid the "deserved price" when he lost the London mayoral election. Alexander said: "Ken's campaign too often looked like the past rather than the future and when I saw his remarks about the Jewish community in London in particular, I didn't just think it was ill-advised, I thought it was wrong". Livingstone hit back on Twitter, saying the Shadow Foreign Secretary "represents a failed New Labour project that lost millions of votes". He also invited him to discuss the issue on his radio show.

Alexander has been a vocal critic of anti-Semitism within the Labour Party and is a supporting member of one of the oldest socialist societies affiliated to the Party: the Jewish Labour Movement. In 2011, Alexander was among the first to publicly condemn Paul Flynn, the Labour MP for Newport West for his comments regarding the religion of Britain's first Jewish ambassador to Israel. Alexander, who at the time was serving as Labour's Shadow Foreign Secretary, said in response to Flynn's comments about Ambassador Matthew Gould that: "The faith of any British diplomat is irrelevant to their capability to their job. To make suggestions otherwise is wrong and offensive".

=== Public speeches ===
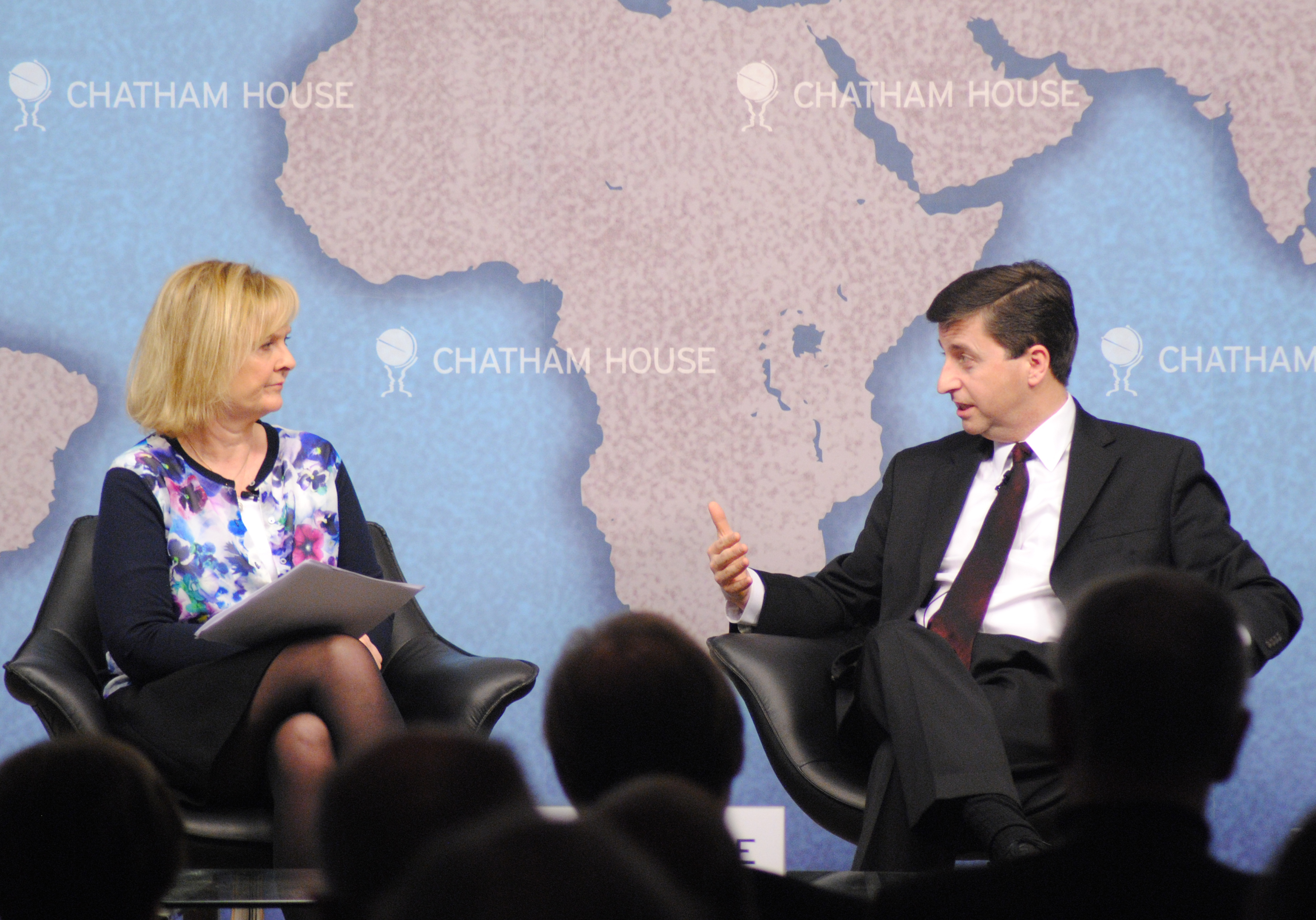
Alexander (right) in January 2014

On 29 June 2010, five years after the Make Poverty History March in Edinburgh, Alexander gave a speech to the Labour Campaign for International Development about the progress made towards achieving the Gleneagles Summit Goals and on the future of International Development.

On 12 October 2011, Alexander delivered the Andrew John Williamson Memorial Lecture, at Stirling University. In his lecture entitled: "A Better Nation?" A Personal Reflection on Scotland's Future. Alexander explored the difference between the political ideologies of nationalism and socialism and outlined a strategy for Scottish Labour to reclaim the mantel of devolution and successfully defeat the campaign for Scottish separation.

On 17 January 2013, in a speech to the foreign policy think-tank Chatham House, Alexander outlined his support for the UK to remain a full member state of the European Union but would not support a federal United States of Europe.

On 3 May 2013, Alexander delivered the 4th Judith Hart Memorial Lecture for which he received a lot of media attention for addressing the issue of Scottish Independence ahead of the referendum to be held the following year. Alexander paid tribute to Judith Hart's "strong sense of solidarity" advocating for Scotland to vote to remain part of the United Kingdom, saying: "Walking away from others has never been our way – walking with others has been our heritage and to my mind should be our future".

=== Expenses controversy ===
During the 2009 MP expenses scandal, Alexander was one of three Labour ministers who "quietly repaid more than £50,000 in expenses". It emerged he had repaid more than £12,000 that he had previously claimed in expenses on his taxpayer-funded second home while also receiving income from a tenant at the same home. This represented double-funding for his second home and was against the expenses rules.

== Career outside Parliament ==
After leaving public office, Alexander became a Fisher Family Fellow at Harvard University where he served as a Senior Fellow at the Belfer Center for Science and International Affairs (2016–2022). He has served as a Fellow in the Institute of Politics at the University of Chicago (2016), and as a visiting professor at New York University (Abu Dhabi) (2020-2024). He also served as a visiting professor at King's College London's Policy Institute (2015-2024). In November 2015 Alexander started working as a senior advisor to Bono, helping secure investment to tackle global poverty. In March 2016 Alexander joined the Pinsent Masons law firm as a "strategic advisor".

He served as a Council Member on the European Council on Foreign Relations, a Trustee of the Royal United Services Institute, and Chair of the Programme Committee at The Ditchley Foundation (2024).

=== Broadcasting ===
Alexander has written and presented programmes for BBC Radio 4 including: the documentary: "A Culture of Encounter" (2017), in which Alexander brought together experts and community organisations to explore the cultural, economic, and political polarising forces in society. He also authored and presented the three part "Belonging" series (2018) comprising these episodes: 'Old Ties', 'New Bonds', and 'Tomorrow's Stories'. This series, in which Alexander explored the erosion of class, religion and security in society to explain why the ties that previously gave so many a shared sense of belonging have weakened, was nominated by BBC Radio 4 for the International URTI Radio Grand Prix (31st edition) Prize for Public Service Media and Social Networks.

At the end of 2019 Alexander authored and presented a programme called: A Guide to Disagreeing Better. This programme was broadcast in January 2020 and explores why public discourse has become so ill-tempered and lacking in respect. Alexander interviews a range of contributors with personal tales about how to disagree better. The programme received widespread news coverage.

Ahead of COP26 in 2021, Alexander authored and presented a further BBC Radio 4 programme called 'Glasgow: Our Last Best Hope', an essential guide to COP26, its hope of success and what the transition to net zero could mean for Glaswegians and all of us, with contributions from John Kerry, Christian Figueres, Mark Carney and Alok Sharma.

In May 2022, Alexander authored and presented Connections which examined whether recent crises, including the COVID-19 pandemic and Russo-Ukrainian War, have helped bring people together or driven them apart.

=== Bullying claims while chair of UNICEF UK ===
Douglas Alexander served as chair of the board of trustees for UNICEF UK from June 2018 to September 2020. Alexander stepped down as chair in September 2020 following accusations of bullying by then-executive director Sasha Deshmukh, although he had the support of the board. A review by Morgan, Lewis & Bockius which reported in January 2021 described the bullying allegations made by Deshmukh as "unsubstantiated", and in respect of complaints made by three other employees, said that although Alexander's manner "did cause some discomfort and upset to the three employees", that "when viewed objectively, it did not amount to bullying".

=== University of Edinburgh ===
In August 2021, Alexander was a General Court Assessor at the University of Edinburgh Court, his alma mater (2021-2024). Alexander was a member of the University of Edinburgh Court, the university's highest governing body, and the General Council Business Committee and the Policy and Resources Committee.

== Return to Parliament ==
=== Ministry appointment ===
In December 2022, Alexander sought out a return to Parliament by applying to be Labour's parliamentary candidate for East Lothian which at the time was the party's #1 target seat in Scotland, held by the Alba Party's Kenny MacAskill. He won the selection to stand for Labour in the constituency in February 2023. He won the seat and was re-elected to Parliament for the first time as a Labour Co-op MP in July 2024. He was subsequently appointed Minister of State for Trade Policy and Economic Security on 6 July and appointed Minister of State in the Cabinet Office on 10 February 2025.

=== Secretary of State for Scotland (2025–) ===
During the 2025 British cabinet reshuffle, he was appointed to succeed Ian Murray as Secretary of State for Scotland on 5 September 2025. On 20 July 2026, Alexander was reappointed by Prime Minister Andy Burnham.

== Publications ==
Alexander has written numerous pieces for publication in national newspapers in the UK and the USA including The New York Times, the Los Angeles Times, The Guardian, and The Boston Globe.

He has contributed to, authored and edited several books: "New Scotland New Britain" (1999), "Europe in a Global Age" (2005), "Serving a Cause, Serving a Community" (2006), "Renewing our offer not retracing our steps", The Purple Book (2011), "Influencing Tomorrow: Future Challenges for British Foreign Policy (2013), and "Britain in a complex world", Why Vote Labour 2015: The Essential Guide (2014) and "Rethink: How We Can Make A Better World" (2021), a collection of essays focused on a global 'reset moment' with leading international figures giving glimpses of a better future after the pandemic including contributions from Pope Francis, Niall Ferguson, Samantha Power and Paul Krugman.

== Personal life ==
Douglas married Jacqueline Christian in 2000, and together they have a daughter and a son. His sister, Wendy Alexander, was also involved in politics as an MSP until 2011 and briefly as the Leader of the Labour Party in the Scottish Parliament until she resigned in 2008. His father, a Church of Scotland minister, conducted the funeral of the inaugural First Minister of Scotland, Donald Dewar at Glasgow Cathedral in 2000. He is the great-nephew of Cecil Frances Alexander.

He is a member of the Fabian Society.

== Bibliography ==
- Torrance, David, The Scottish Secretaries (Birlinn 2006)

Parliament of the United Kingdom
| Preceded by Gordon McMaster | Member of Parliament for Paisley South; 1997–2005 | Constituency abolished |
| New constituency | Member of Parliament for Paisley and Renfrewshire South; 2005–2015 | Succeeded by Mhairi Black |
| Preceded by Kenny MacAskill | Member of Parliament for Lothian East; 2024–Present | Incumbent |
Political offices
| Preceded by The Lord Macdonald of Tradeston | Minister for the Cabinet Office; 2003–2004 | Succeeded by Alan Milburn |
| Preceded by The Lord Macdonald of Tradeston | Chancellor of the Duchy of Lancaster; 2003–2004 | Succeeded by Alan Milburn |
| Preceded by Mike O'Brien | Minister of State for Trade; 2004–2005 | Succeeded by Ian Pearson |
| Preceded by Denis MacShane | Minister of State for Europe; 2005–2006 | Succeeded by Geoff Hoon |
| Preceded by Alistair Darling | Secretary of State for Transport; 2006–2007 | Succeeded by Ruth Kelly |
| Preceded by Alistair Darling | Secretary of State for Scotland; 2006–2007 | Succeeded by Des Browne |
| Preceded by Hilary Benn | Secretary of State for International Development; 2007–2010 | Succeeded by Andrew Mitchell |
| Preceded by Andrew Mitchell | Shadow Secretary of State for International Development; 2010 | Succeeded by Harriet Harman |
| Preceded by Yvette Cooper | Shadow Secretary of State for Work and Pensions; 2010–2011 | Succeeded by Liam Byrne |
| Preceded by Yvette Cooper | Shadow Foreign Secretary; 2011–2015 | Succeeded by Hilary Benn |
