= Tunnock's =

Scottish confectionery company

Thomas Tunnock Limited
- Type: Private limited company
- Industry: Food and drink (bakery)
- Founded: December 1890; 135 years ago in Uddingston, Lanarkshire, Scotland
- Founder: Thomas Tunnock
- Headquarters: Uddingston, Scotland
- Products: Cakes, biscuits
- Owner: Tunnock family
- Number of employees: 550
- Website: www.tunnock.co.uk

Thomas Tunnock Limited, branded as Tunnock's, is a Scottish confectionery company based in Uddingston, Scotland. It is headed by Boyd Tunnock, grandson of founder Thomas Tunnock. In 2013, it was the 20th oldest family firm in Scotland.

In the 2019 and 2020 seasons, Tunnock's sponsored the Scottish Challenge Cup in Scottish football.

== History ==
Tunnock's was formed by Thomas Tunnock (b. 1865) as Tunnock's in 1890, when he purchased a baker's shop in Lorne Place, Uddingston. The company expanded in the 1950s, and it was at this time that the core products were introduced to the lines, when sugar and fat rationing meant that products with longer shelf-lives than cakes had to be produced.

The face of Tunnock's boy

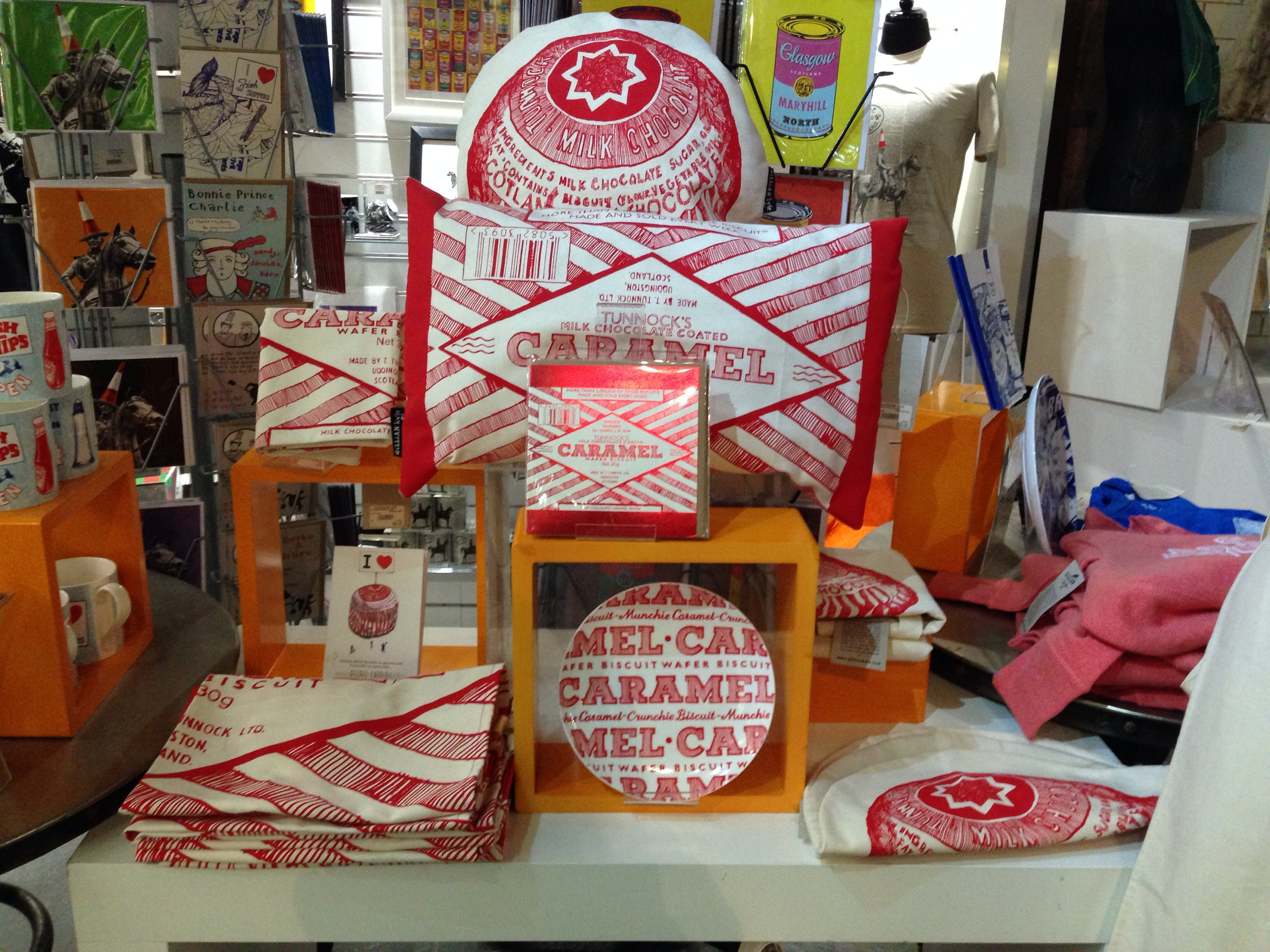
Gifts and art works inspired by Tunnock's distinctive design

From 2005 until 2015, Tunnock's sponsored the Tour of Mull, an annual car rally held on the Isle of Mull.

In September 2010, Tunnock's workers in Uddingston, conducted two 24-hour strikes during contract negotiations. At main issue were salaries, with management having originally offered an increase of 1%, followed by a second offer of 2%. The dispute was resolved in October 2010 with agreement on a 2.5% increase backdated to the start of July 2010, followed by a 2.5% increase in July 2011.

In November 2015, Tunnock's made a donation of £250,000 to an appeal for an independent lifeboat station at St Abbs.

=== Scottish identity ===
Tunnocks has been described as an iconic Scottish brand and its packaging features the Scottish lion rampant. Having been a Scottish, family-owned company since it was formed, this remains a feature of its identity.

In an April 2012 interview with The Herald, managing director Boyd Tunnock described himself as "Nationalist British" on the question of Scottish independence, stating: "I'm not frightened to say that I'm a Unionist."

In the 2014 Commonwealth Games opening ceremony in Glasgow, dancers dressed as Tunnock's teacakes danced around the main performers near the start of the Scottish-themed show. Sales of Tunnock's tea cakes were 62% higher at Waitrose the day after the ceremony.

In 2016 this association with Scottish identity raised concerns about the company playing down its origins, when an advertising campaign on London Underground chose to omit the Lion Rampant and label their teacakes as "Tunnock’s Great British Teacake". Boyd Tunnock explained "Down south, people wouldn’t know it as Scottish."

In July 2017 Tunnock's announced it would be branding their wafer creams sold in Japan, as "Made in Great Britain". The company did not have high hopes of success in the Japanese market. "The Japanese don't like caramel wafers. It's a cultural thing – they say they are too chewy."

== Products ==
=== Teacakes ===
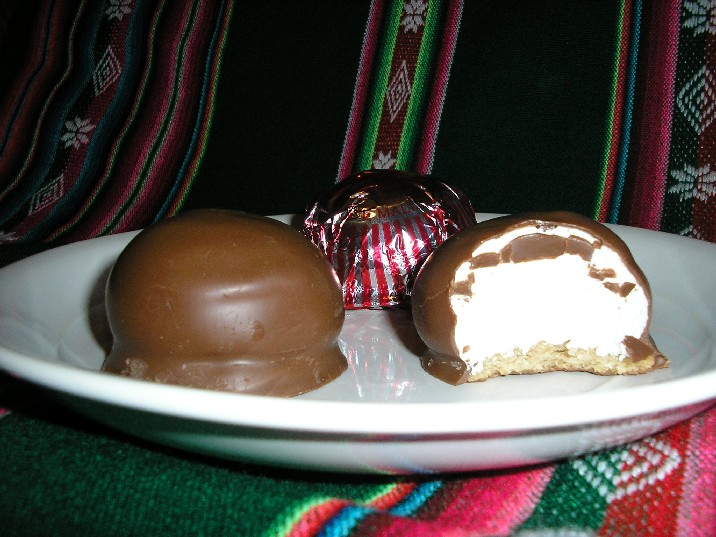
Two-and-a-half Tunnock's Teacakes

The Tunnock's Teacake was developed by Boyd Tunnock in 1956. The product consists of a small round shortbread biscuit covered with a dome of Italian meringue, a whipped egg white concoction similar to marshmallow, although somewhat lighter in texture. This is then encased in a thin layer of milk or dark chocolate and wrapped in a red and silver foil paper for the more popular milk chocolate variety, with blue, black, and gold wrapping for the dark.

Retired RAF bomber pilot Tony Cunnane told of how Tunnock's Teacakes became a favourite ration snack of the V bomber nuclear deterrent flight crews based at RAF Gaydon, especially after discovering that they expanded at high altitude. In 1965 this ended after one was left unwrapped and exploded on the instrument panel and led to a ban by the RAF.

In April 2025 the RAF Centre of Aerospace Medicine gave the all-clear for the teacakes to be used in flights again, after tests in an altitude chamber found the teacakes did not explode.

=== Caramel wafers ===
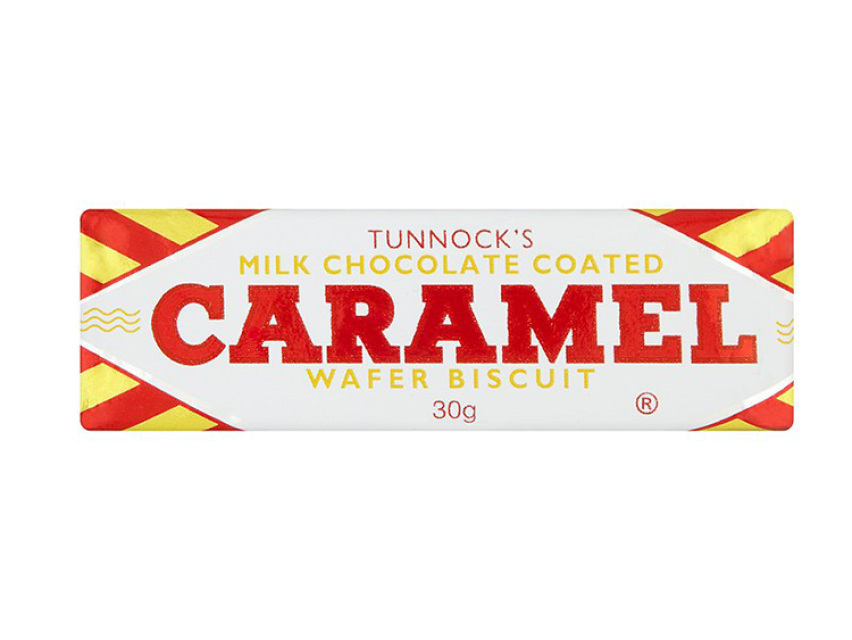
A milk chocolate Tunnock's Caramel Wafer

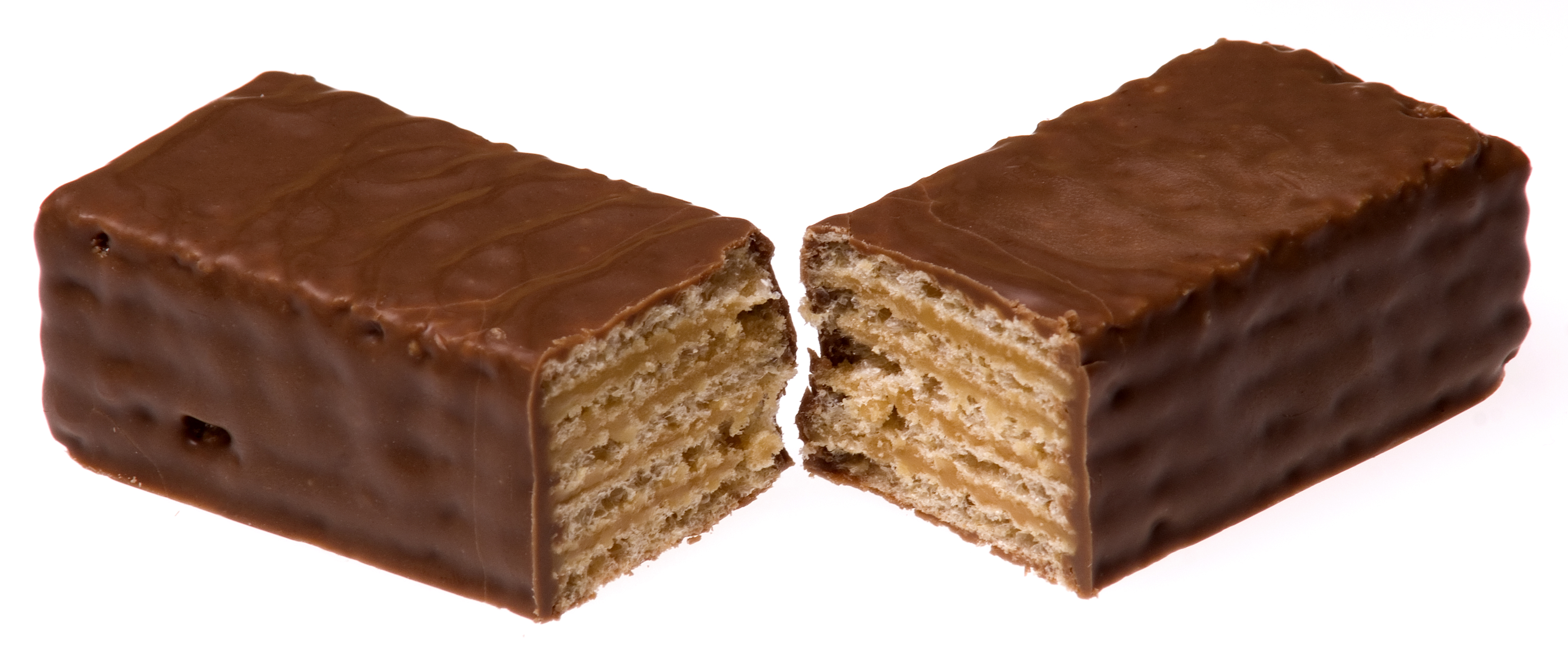
A Caramel Wafer split

The Tunnock's Caramel Wafer, officially the Tunnock's Milk Chocolate Coated Caramel Wafer Biscuit, is a bar consisting of five layers of wafer, separated by four layers of caramel. The bar is coated in chocolate, made from cocoa and milk solids. The wafers are wrapped in red and gold coloured foil. Dark chocolate wafers, wrapped blue and gold, are also available.

The University of St Andrews had a Tunnock's Caramel Wafer Appreciation Society, founded in 1982, disbanded in 2016.

In 2022, Tunnock's were the pitch sponsor at Uddingston Rugby Club, turning their padded posts into wrapped Caramel Wafer bars. They are also commonly handed out on Loganair flights as an in-flight snack. As of 2025, the airline estimated that it had served around six million wafers on its routes.

=== Other products ===
Tunnock's Snowballs and Caramel Logs

The Caramel Log is similar to the Caramel Wafer, but with the addition of roasted coconut to the outside of the bar. Wafer Creams and Florida Orange have chocolate and orange flavoured cream in place of the caramel.

The Snowball is similar to the Tea Cake, with the addition of grated coconut to the exterior of a soft chocolate shell but with no biscuit base.

Despite pressure to do so, Tunnock's does not make any own brand biscuits for supermarkets.

In 2013, Tunnocks's entered into an agreement with Tesco to sell a range of branded items produced by Glasgow-based promotional materials firm Orb. Fergus Loudon, sales manager for Tunnock's stated: "As well as teacake tea towels, aprons and china mugs, there will be the ideal gift for the many caramel wafer fans – a 'yard of caramel wafers'." As of 2015, the products continue to be sold both through Tesco and directly from Orb.
