= Boyd Tunnock =

Scottish businessman

Sir Boyd Tunnock CBE
- Born: 25 January 1933 (age 93)
- Occupation: Confectioner
- Organization: Tunnock's
- Known for: Creation of the company's teacake
- Children: Guy McCafferty Tunnock Magnus Kermack Tunnock

Sir Archibald Boyd Tunnock CBE (born 25 January 1933) is a Scottish businessman, the owner of Tunnock's, a confectionery business based in Uddingston, Scotland. He is the grandson of the firm's founder, Thomas Tunnock, and created the company's famous teacake, which was first produced in 1956.

Tunnock was appointed an MBE in the 1987 Birthday Honours and promoted to CBE in the 2004 Birthday Honours. He was knighted in the 2019 Birthday Honours for services to business and charity.

Tunnock was educated at Allan Glen's School in Glasgow, starting there in 1945. He has been an Elder at Uddingston Old Parish Church of the Church of Scotland ('the Kirk') for over 50 years and has involvement in various charities. He is a Freemason and is a member of Lodge St. Bryde No 579 in Uddingston. He was presented with his diamond jubilee certificate for 60 years' membership of the lodge on 23 March 2016.

In 2019, Tunnock donated a Rolls-Royce to Glasgow city council, to transport the lord provost to official engagements and "maintain civic pride". The vehicle was auctioned off in 2022.

== Personal life ==
In an April 2012 interview with The Herald, Tunnock described himself as a unionist on the question of Scottish independence.
