= Geoffrey Filkin, Baron Filkin =

British Labour politician

The Right Honourable The Lord Filkin CBE
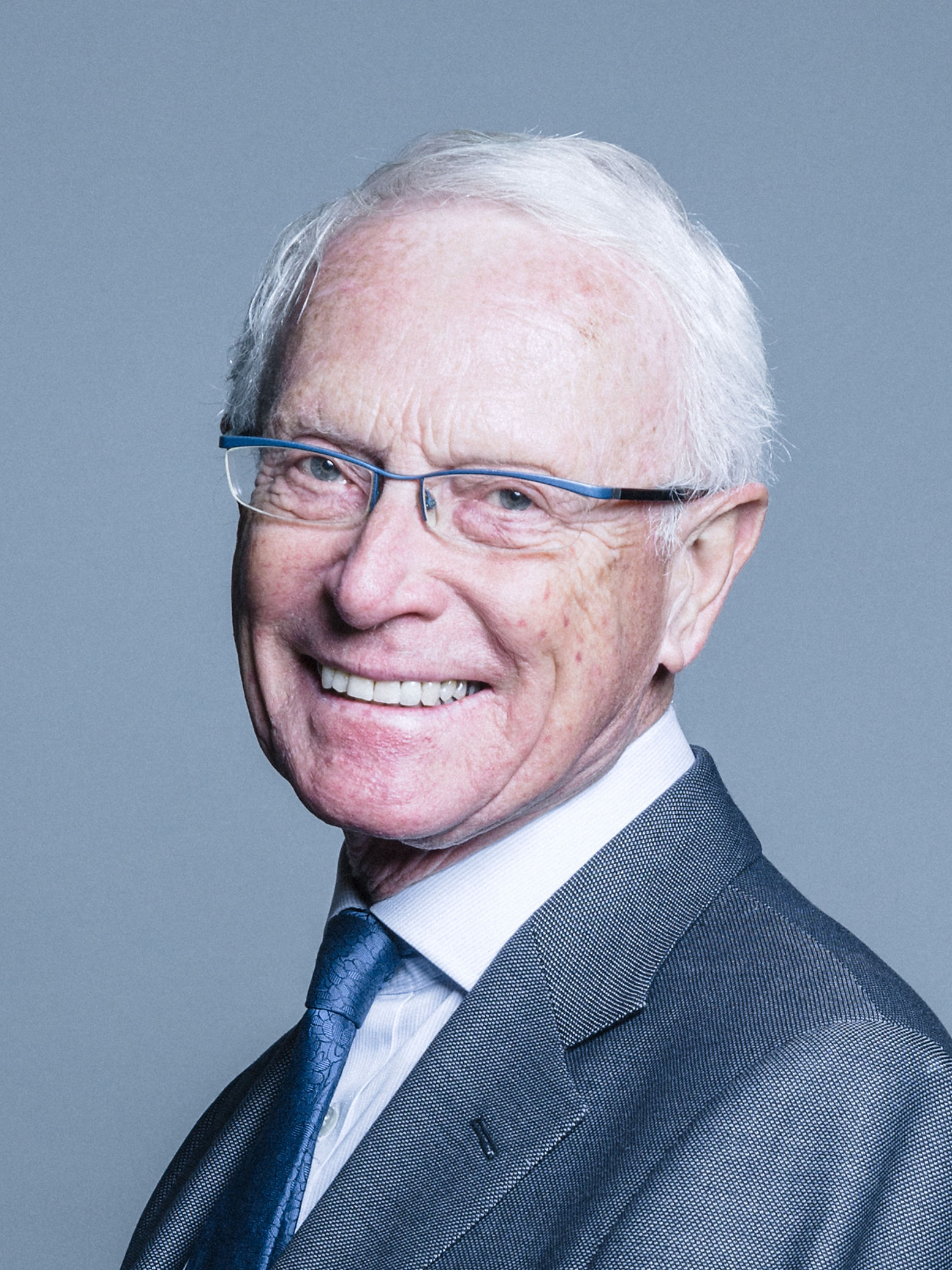
- Official portrait, 2018

Parliamentary Under-Secretary of State for Education
- In office 9 September 2004 – 10 May 2005
- Prime Minister: Tony Blair
- Preceded by: The Baroness Ashton of Upholland
- Succeeded by: The Lord Adonis

Parliamentary Under-Secretary of State for Constitutional Affairs
- In office 13 June 2003 – 9 September 2004
- Prime Minister: Tony Blair
- Preceded by: The Baroness Scotland of Asthal
- Succeeded by: The Baroness Ashton of Upholland

Parliamentary Under-Secretary of State for Home Affairs
- In office 29 May 2002 – 13 June 2003
- Prime Minister: Tony Blair
- Preceded by: Beverley Hughes
- Succeeded by: Fiona Mactaggart

Lord-in-Waiting Government Whip
- In office 11 June 2001 – 29 May 2002
- Prime Minister: Tony Blair
- Preceded by: The Baroness Ramsay of Cartvale
- Succeeded by: no appointment

Member of the House of Lords
- Lord Temporal
- Life peerage 29 July 1999

Personal details
- Born: David Geoffrey Nigel Filkin; 1 July 1944 (age 82) Birmingham
- Party: Labour
- Occupation: Chair, Centre for Ageing Better (2013−2018)

David Geoffrey Nigel Filkin, Baron Filkin, CBE (born 1 July 1944) is a British Labour politician.

== Career ==
Filkin was educated at King Edward VI Five Ways School, Birmingham, and Clare College, Cambridge, where he read history. His early career was as a Director of Housing and then Chief Executive in Local Government. He was Chief Executive of the Association of District Councils, representing local authorities to government, promoting the foundation of the Local Government Association and creating Best Value, the policy for sourcing in local government. Later he was a policy analyst and writer, contributing to the development of Labour's policies for local and regional government.

In 1999 he was made a life peer and in 2000 he led the Prime Minister's Review of local government and subsequently was a government minister for four years. In 2000 he founded the Parliament Choir with Simon Over.

He has worked since then to promote more action by government to help people live healthier lives, first as Chair of the Centre for Ageing Better and then to influence government and party manifestos for action to prevent ill health,

== Public and Parliamentary career ==
Filkin, having been appointed a Commander of the Order of the British Empire in the 1997 New Year Honours, was created a life peer as Baron Filkin, of Pimlico in the City of Westminster, on 29 July 1999. In 2000, with Simon Over, he founded the Parliament Choir, which gathers members of both Houses of Parliament and Parliamentary Staff.

He has held a number of Government offices, first as Lord in Waiting (junior Whip) from June 2001 to May 2002, then as Under-Secretary of State for the Home Department from May 2002 until June 2003, and then as Parliamentary Under-Secretary of State in the Departments for Constitutional Affairs (June 2003 to September 2004) and Education and Skills (September 2004 to May 2005).

He founded the Public Services Research Group which published Public Matters, a critical review of Labour's public service reforms and in 2008 he founded and chaired the charity, 2020 Public Services Trust. Its Commission into Public Services in 2020 reported in 2010. He led the report, Commissioning for Outcomes, proposing and explaining the policy of paying for results. He was made an Honorary Fellow of the Chartered Institute for Purchasing and Supply. He founded the Parliament Choir in 2000, chaired the Committee on Statutory Instruments from 2005 to 2010.

In 2012 he proposed and then chaired the Lords Select Committee on Public Services and Demographic Change. Its highly influential report, report on "Ready for Ageing?"was published in March 2013.

He was appointed chair of the Big Lottery Fund's Centre for Ageing Better in November 2013, Filkin set aside the Labour whip, choosing to sit as a non-affiliated peer. Upon his resignation from the charity's chairmanship in 2018, Filkin returned to the Labour whip in January 2019.

He has worked since then to promote more action by government to help people live healthier lives. First he was the lead author for the APPG for Longevity's project on the Health of the Nation, 2020 launched by Matt Hancock, Secretary of State for Health and then Levelling Up Health, April 2021 after the pandemic.

In 2023 he formed a group of experts to influence the Party Manifestos for the next election. He was the lead author of Covenant for Health 2023; Health is Wealth, 2024 and Action Plan for Better Health 2024 and the Labour Manifesto for 2024 adopted many of the recomnedations.

In 2026 he was appointed to the Board of Active Travel England.

Orders of precedence in the United Kingdom
Preceded by The Lord Goldsmith	Gentlemen; Baron Filkin	Followed by The Lord Sharman
