= Third Blair ministry =

Government of the United Kingdom from 2005 to 2007

- Cabinet of the United Kingdom
- 2005–2007
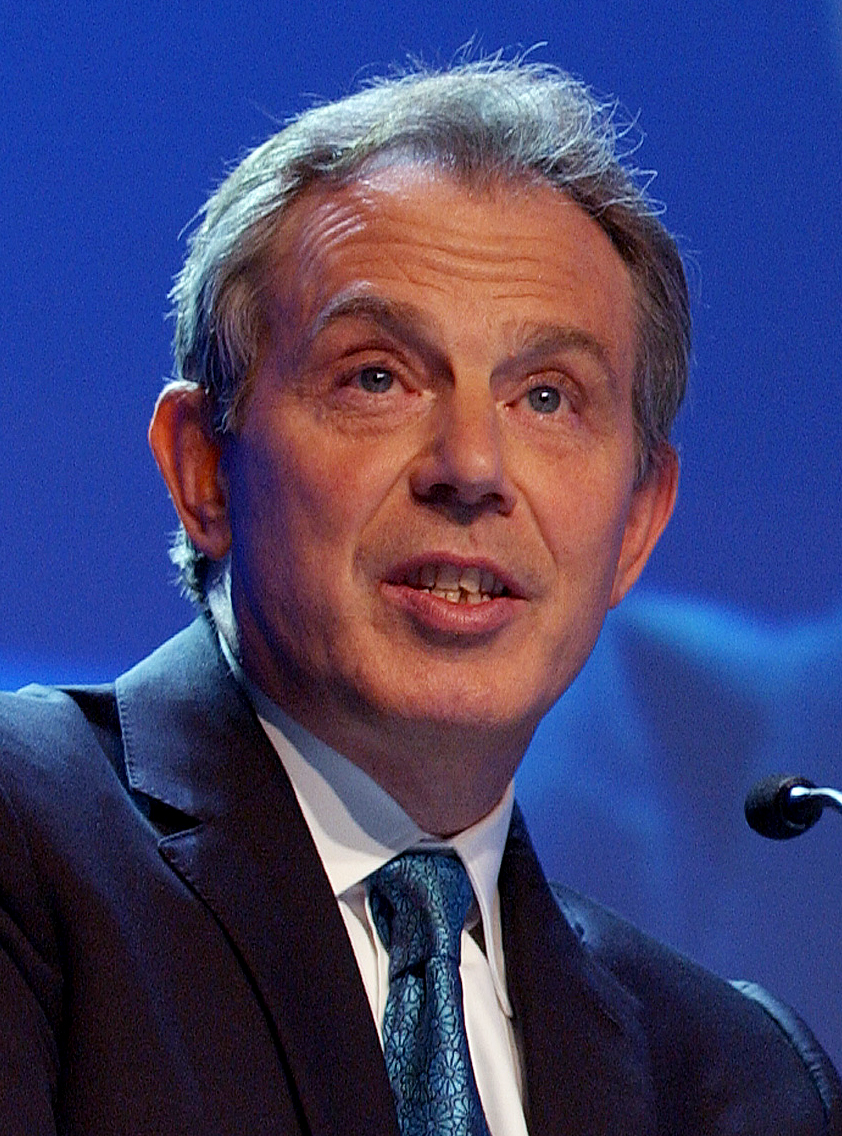
- Blair in 2005
- Date formed: 6 May 2005
- Date dissolved: 27 June 2007

People and organisations
- Monarch: Elizabeth II
- Prime Minister: Tony Blair
- Prime Minister's history: 1997–2007
- Deputy Prime Minister: John Prescott
- Member party: Labour Party
- Status in legislature: Majority
- Opposition cabinet: Howard shadow cabinet; Cameron shadow cabinet
- Opposition party: Conservative Party
- Opposition leader: Michael Howard (2005); David Cameron (2005–2007)

History
- Outgoing formation: 2007 leadership election
- Election: 2005 general election
- Legislature term: 2005–2010
- Budgets: 2006 budget; 2007 budget
- Predecessor: Second Blair ministry
- Successor: Brown ministry

The third Blair ministry was the government of the United Kingdom from 2005 to 2007. The 2005 general election saw the Labour Party win a historic third successive term in power, though their majority now stood at 66 seats—compared to 167 four years earlier—and they failed to gain any new seats. Blair had already declared that the new term in Parliament would be his last.

The War in Afghanistan and the Iraq War continued during his last ministry, and the 7/7 bombings also took place. Blair's government responded by introducing a range of anti-terror legislation, including the passing of the contentious Identity Cards Act 2006 legislation (repealed in 2011). Blair announced in 2006 that he would resign as prime minister and Labour leader within a year. He resigned on 27 June 2007 and was succeeded by Gordon Brown, his chancellor since 1997.

== Cabinet ==
Portfolio	Portrait	Minister	Term
Cabinet ministers
Prime Minister; First Lord of the Treasury; Minister for the Civil Service		Tony Blair	1997–2007
Deputy Prime Minister; First Secretary of State; Secretary of State for Local Government and the Regions 2002–May 2006		John Prescott	1997–2007
Chancellor of the Exchequer; Second Lord of the Treasury		Gordon Brown	1997–2007
Lord High Chancellor of Great Britain; Secretary of State for Constitutional Affairs 2003–May 2007; Secretary of State for Justice May–June 2007		Charlie Falconer, Baron Falconer of Thoroton	2003–2007
Home Secretary		Charles Clarke	2004–2006
Home Secretary		John Reid	2006–2007
Foreign Secretary		Jack Straw	2001–2006
Foreign Secretary		Margaret Beckett	2006–2007
Leader of the House of Commons; Lord Keeper of the Privy Seal		Geoff Hoon	2005–2006
Leader of the House of Commons; Lord Keeper of the Privy Seal		Jack Straw	2006–2007
Leader of the House of Lords; Lord President of the Council		Valerie Amos, Baroness Amos	2003–2007
Secretary of State for Culture, Media and Sport; Minister for the Olympics		Tessa Jowell	2001–2007
Secretary of State for Defence		John Reid	2005–2006
Secretary of State for Defence		Des Browne	2006–2008
Secretary of State for Education and Skills		Ruth Kelly	2004–2006
Secretary of State for Education and Skills		Alan Johnson	2006–2007
Secretary of State for Environment, Food and Rural Affairs		Margaret Beckett	2001–2006
Secretary of State for Environment, Food and Rural Affairs		David Miliband	2006–2007
Secretary of State for Health		Patricia Hewitt	2005–2007
Secretary of State for International Development		Hilary Benn	2003–2007
Secretary of State for Northern Ireland		Peter Hain	2002–2008
Secretary of State for Wales		Peter Hain	2005–2007
Secretary of State for Trade and Industry; President of the Board of Trade		Alan Johnson	2005–2006
Secretary of State for Trade and Industry; President of the Board of Trade		Alistair Darling	2006–2007
Secretary of State for Transport; Secretary of State for Scotland		Alistair Darling	2003–2006
Secretary of State for Transport; Secretary of State for Scotland		Douglas Alexander	2006–2007
Secretary of State for Communities and Local Government		Ruth Kelly	2006–2007
Secretary of State for Work and Pensions		David Blunkett	2005
Secretary of State for Work and Pensions		John Hutton	2005–2007
Minister for the Cabinet Office; Chancellor of the Duchy of Lancaster		John Hutton	2005
Minister for the Cabinet Office; Chancellor of the Duchy of Lancaster		Jim Murphy (Acting)	2005–2006
Minister for the Cabinet Office; Chancellor of the Duchy of Lancaster		Hilary Armstrong	2006–2007
Chief Secretary to the Treasury		Des Browne	2005–2006
Chief Secretary to the Treasury		Stephen Timms	2006–2007
Minister Without Portfolio; Chairman of the Labour Party		Ian McCartney	2003–2006
Minister Without Portfolio; Chairman of the Labour Party		Hazel Blears	2006–2007
Also attending cabinet meetings
Chief Whip; Parliamentary Secretary to the Treasury		Hilary Armstrong	2001–2006
Chief Whip; Parliamentary Secretary to the Treasury		Jacqui Smith	2006–2007

=== Changes ===
- November 2005 – David Blunkett resigns his post as Secretary of State for Work and Pensions. He is replaced by John Hutton, leaving the post of Chancellor of the Duchy of Lancaster vacant for six months.
- May 2006 – Following a poor showing in the local council elections, Blair reshuffles his cabinet. Charles Clarke, Geoff Hoon and Ian McCartney leave the Cabinet. Jack Straw becomes Leader of the House of Commons and Lord Keeper of the Privy Seal. Margaret Beckett is promoted to Foreign Secretary, John Reid to Home Secretary, David Miliband to Secretary of State for the Environment, Food and Rural Affairs and Des Browne to Secretary of State for Defence. Ruth Kelly takes a new post of Secretary of State for Communities and Local Government, which replaces the post held by David Miliband and takes a number of responsibilities previously held by the Office of the Deputy Prime Minister; Kelly will also serve as Minister for Women and Equality. Alan Johnson becomes Secretary of State for Education and Skills. Alistair Darling becomes Secretary of State for Trade and Industry. Hilary Armstrong becomes Chancellor of the Duchy of Lancaster, Minister for the Cabinet Office and Minister for Social Exclusion. Douglas Alexander enters the Cabinet as Secretary of State for Transport and Secretary of State for Scotland. Hazel Blears enters the Cabinet as Minister Without Portfolio and Party Chair, Stephen Timms as Chief Secretary to the Treasury and Jacqui Smith as Parliamentary Secretary to the Treasury and Chief Whip.
- May 2007 – The Home Office loses responsibility for criminal justice, prisons & probation and legal affairs which merges into the Department for Constitutional Affairs with Falconer becoming Secretary of State for Justice.
- June 2007 – On 27 June, Tony Blair officially tenders his resignation as Prime Minister to Queen Elizabeth II, with Deputy Prime Minister and First Secretary of State, John Prescott leaving office at the same time.

== List of ministers ==
=== Prime Minister, the Cabinet Office and non-Departmental ministers ===
Cabinet Office
Prime Minister of the United Kingdom; First Lord of the Treasury; Minister for the Civil Service	Tony Blair	May 2005 – June 2007
Deputy Prime Minister; First Secretary of State	John Prescott	May 2005 – June 2007
Minister for the Cabinet Office; Chancellor of the Duchy of Lancaster	John Hutton	May 2005 – November 2005
Minister for the Cabinet Office; Chancellor of the Duchy of Lancaster	Jim Murphy (acting)	November 2005 – May 2006
Minister for the Cabinet Office; Chancellor of the Duchy of Lancaster	Hilary Armstrong	May 2006 – June 2007
Minister without Portfolio, Chairman of the Labour Party	Ian McCartney	May 2005 - May 2006
Minister without Portfolio, Chairman of the Labour Party	Hazel Blears	May 2006 - June 2007
Lord Chancellor; Secretary of State for Constitutional Affairs (until 9 May 2007); Secretary of State for Justice (from 9 May 2007)	Charlie Falconer, Baron Falconer of Thoroton	May 2005 – June 2007
Parliamentary Secretary	Jim Murphy	May 2005 - May 2006
Parliamentary Secretary	Pat McFadden	May 2006 - June 2007
Parliamentary Secretary	Ed Miliband	May 2006 - June 2007

=== Departments of state ===
Treasury
Chancellor of the Exchequer	Gordon Brown	May 2005 – June 2007
Chief Secretary to the Treasury	Des Browne	May 2005 – May 2006
Chief Secretary to the Treasury	Stephen Timms	May 2006 – June 2007
Paymaster General	Dawn Primarolo	May 2005 – June 2007
Financial Secretary to the Treasury	John Healey	May 2005 – June 2007
Economic Secretary to the Treasury	Ivan Lewis	May 2005 – May 2006
Economic Secretary to the Treasury	Ed Balls	May 2006 – June 2007

Foreign Office
Foreign Secretary	Jack Straw	May 2005 – May 2006
Foreign Secretary	Margaret Beckett	May 2006 – June 2007
Minister of State for the Middle East	Kim Howells	May 2005 – June 2007
Minister of State for Europe	Douglas Alexander	May 2005 – May 2006
Minister of State for Europe	Geoff Hoon	May 2006 – June 2007
Minister for Trade	Ian Pearson (jointly with Trade & Industry)	May 2005 - May 2006
Minister for Trade	Ian McCartney (jointly with Trade & Industry)	May 2006 - June 2007
Parliamentary Under Secretary	David Triesman, Baron Triesman	May 2005 - June 2007

Home Office
Home Secretary	Charles Clarke	May 2005 – May 2006
Home Secretary	John Reid	May 2006 – June 2007
Minister of State for Home Affairs; Minister of State for Security, Policing and Community Safety	Hazel Blears	May 2005 – May 2006
Minister of State for Home Affairs; Minister of State for Security, Policing and Community Safety	Tony McNulty	May 2006 – June 2007
Minister of State for Immigration	Tony McNulty	May 2005 – May 2006
Minister of State for Immigration	Liam Byrne	May 2006 – June 2007
Minister for Criminal Justice & Offender Management	Patricia Scotland, Baroness Scotland of Asthal	May 2005 - June 2007
Parliamentary Under Secretary of State for Correctional Services and Reducing Re-offending	Paul Goggins	May 2005 - May 2006
Parliamentary Under Secretary of State for Race Equality, Community Policy and Civil Renewal	Fiona MacTaggart	May 2005 - May 2006
Parliamentary Under Secretary of State for Anti-Drugs Co-ordination and Organised and International Crime	Andy Burnham	May 2005 - May 2006
Parliamentary Under Secretary of State for Nationality, Citizenship and Immigration	Joan Ryan	May 2006 - June 2007
Parliamentary Under Secretary of State (Minister for Drugs and Crime Reduction)	Vernon Coaker	May 2006 - June 2007
Parliamentary Under Secretary of State for Prisons and Probation Services	Gerry Sutcliffe	May 2006 - June 2007

Department for Environment, Food and Rural Affairs
Secretary of State for Environment, Food and Rural Affairs	Margaret Beckett	May 2005 – May 2006
Secretary of State for Environment, Food and Rural Affairs	David Miliband	May 2006 – June 2007
Minister of State for Climate Change and Environment	Elliot Morley	May 2005 – May 2006
Minister of State for Climate Change and Environment	Ian Pearson	June 2006 – June 2007
Minister of State for Local Environment, Marine and Animal Welfare	Ben Bradshaw	November 2006 - June 2007
Parliamentary Under Secretary of State for Local Environment, Marine and Animal Welfare	Ben Bradshaw	May 2005 - November 2006
Parliamentary Under Secretary of State for Rural Affairs, Landscape and Biodiversity	Jim Knight	May 2005 - May 2006
Parliamentary Under Secretary of State for Rural Affairs, Landscape and Biodiversity	Barry Gardiner	May 2006 - June 2007
Parliamentary Under Secretary of State for Sustainable Farming and Food	Willy Bach, Baron Bach	May 2005 - May 2006
Parliamentary Under Secretary of State for Sustainable Farming and Food	Jeff Rooker, Baron Rooker	May 2006 - June 2007
Parliamentary Under Secretary of State (jointly with Constitutional Affairs)	Catherine Ashton, Baroness Ashton of Upholland	May 2006 - June 2007

Defence
Secretary of State for Defence	John Reid	May 2005 – May 2006
Secretary of State for Defence	Des Browne	May 2006 – June 2007
Minister of State for the Armed Forces	Adam Ingram	May 2005 – June 2007
Minister for Defence Procurement	Paul Drayson, Baron Drayson	May 2005 – June 2007
Minister for Veterans	Don Touhig	May 2005 - May 2006
Minister for Veterans	Tom Watson	May 2006 - September 2006
Minister for Veterans	Derek Twigg	September 2006 - June 2007

Education and Skills
Secretary of State for Education and Skills	Ruth Kelly	May 2005 – May 2006
Secretary of State for Education and Skills	Alan Johnson	May 2006 – June 2007
Minister of State for Schools and Learners	Jacqui Smith	May 2005 – May 2006
Minister of State for Schools and Learners	Jim Knight	May 2006 – June 2007
Minister of State for Higher Education	Bill Rammell	May 2005 – June 2007
Parliamentary Under Secretary of State for Children and Families	Maria Eagle	May 2005 – May 2006
Parliamentary Under Secretary of State for Children and Families	Parmjit Dhanda	May 2006 - June 2007
Minister for Children (United Kingdom)	Beverley Hughes	May 2005 - June 2007
Parliamentary Under Secretary of State for Skills	Phil Hope	May 2005 - June 2007
Parliamentary Under Secretary of State for Schools	Andrew Adonis, Baron Adonis	May 2005 - June 2007

Health
Secretary of State for Health	Patricia Hewitt	May 2005 – June 2007
Minister of State for Health	Jane Kennedy	May 2005 – May 2006
Minister of State for Health	Andy Burnham	May 2006 – June 2007
Minister of State for Health Services	Rosie Winterton	May 2005- June 2007
Minister for Public Health	Caroline Flint	May 2005 – June 2007
Minister of State for NHS Delivery	Norman Warner, Baron Warner	May 2005 - January 2007
Minister of State for NHS Delivery	Philip Hunt, Baron Hunt of Kings Heath	January 2007 - June 2007
Parliamentary Under Secretary of State for Care Services	Liam Byrne	May 2005 - May 2006
Parliamentary Under Secretary of State for Care Services	Ivan Lewis	May 2006 - June 2007

Work and Pensions
Secretary of State for Work and Pensions	David Blunkett	May 2005 – November 2005
Secretary of State for Work and Pensions	John Hutton	November 2005 – June 2007
Minister of State for Pensions	Stephen Timms	May 2005 – May 2006
Minister of State for Pensions	James Purnell	May 2006 – June 2007
Minister of State for Employment & Welfare Reform	Margaret Hodge	May 2005 - May 2006
Minister of State for Employment & Welfare Reform	Jim Murphy	May 2006 - June 2007
Parliamentary Under Secretary of State for Disabled People	Anne McGuire	May 2005 - June 2007
Parliamentary Under Secretary of State	James Plaskitt	May 2005 - June 2007
Parliamentary Under Secretary of State	Philip Hunt, Baron Hunt of Kings Heath	May 2005 - January 2007
Parliamentary Under Secretary of State	Bill McKenzie, Baron McKenzie of Luton	January 2007 - June 2007

Culture, Media and Sport
Secretary of State for Culture, Media and Sport	Tessa Jowell (also Minister for Women May 2005 -May 2006)	May 2005 – 28 June 2007
Minister of State for Culture (Arts & Heritage)	David Lammy	May 2005 – June 2007
Minister for Sport and Olympics	Richard Caborn	May 2005 - June 2007
Parliamentary Under Secretary of State for Creative Industries & Tourism	James Purnell	May 2005 - May 2006
Parliamentary Under Secretary of State for Creative Industries & Tourism	Shaun Woodward	May 2006 - June 2007

Transport
Secretary of State for Transport	Alistair Darling	May 2005 – May 2006
Secretary of State for Transport	Douglas Alexander	May 2006 – June 2007
Minister of State for Transport	Stephen Ladyman	May 2005 – June 2007
Parliamentary Under Secretary of State	Karen Buck	May 2005 - March 2006
Parliamentary Under Secretary of State	Gillian Merron	May 2006 - June 2007
Parliamentary Under Secretary of State	Derek Twigg	May 2005 - September 2006
Parliamentary Under Secretary of State	Tom Harris	September 2006 - June 2007

International Development
Secretary of State for International Development	Hilary Benn	May 2005 - June 2007
Parliamentary Under Secretary of State	Gareth Thomas	May 2005 - June 2007

Communities and Local Government (from May 2006)
Secretary of State for Communities and Local Government	Ruth Kelly (also Minister for Women)	May 2006 - June 2007
Minister of State for Housing and Planning	Yvette Cooper	May 2006 - June 2007
Minister of State for Local Government	Phil Woolas	May 2006 - June 2007
Parliamentary Under Secretary of State for the Fire Services	Angela Smith	May 2006 - June 2007
Parliamentary Under Secretary of State for Women & Equalities	Meg Munn	May 2006 - June 2007
Parliamentary Under Secretary of State	Kay Andrews, Baroness Andrews	May 2006 - June 2007

Department for Constitutional Affairs
Secretary of State for Constitutional Affairs	Charlie Falconer, Baron Falconer of Thoroton	May 2005 - May 2007
Minister of State	Harriet Harman	May 2005 - May 2007
Parliamentary Under Secretary of State	Bridget Prentice	May 2005 - May 2007
Parliamentary Under Secretary of State	Catherine Ashton, Baroness Ashton of Upholland (jointly with DEFRA from May 2006)	May 2005 - May 2007
Parliamentary Under Secretary of State	Vera Baird	May 2006 - May 2007

Justice
Secretary of State for Justice	Charles Falconer, Baron Falconer of Thoroton	May 2007 - June 2007
Minister of State	Harriet Harman	May 2007 - June 2007
Minister of State	David Hanson	May 2007 - June 2007
Parliamentary Under Secretary of State	Catherine Ashton, Baroness Ashton of Upholland	May 2007 - June 2007
Parliamentary Under Secretary of State	Gerry Sutcliffe	May 2007 - June 2007
Parliamentary Under Secretary of State	Bridget Prentice	May 2007 - June 2007
Parliamentary Under Secretary of State	Vera Baird	May 2007 - June 2007

Department for Trade and Industry
Secretary of State for Trade and Industry President of the Board of Trade	Alan Johnson	May 2005 - May 2006
Secretary of State for Trade and Industry President of the Board of Trade	Alistair Darling	May 2006 - June 2007
Minister of State for Energy	Malcolm Wicks	May 2005 - November 2006
Minister of State for Science & Innovation	Malcolm Wicks	November 2006 - June 2007
Minister of State for Industry & the Regions	Alun Michael	May 2005 - May 2006
Minister of State for Industry & the Regions	Margaret Hodge	May 2006 - June 2007
Minister of State for Trade	Ian Pearson (jointly with FCO)	May 2005 - May 2006
Minister of State for Trade	Ian McCartney (jointly with FCO)	May 2006 - June 2007
Parliamentary Under Secretary of State for Science & Innovation	David Sainsbury, Baron Sainsbury of Turville	May 2005 - November 2006
Parliamentary Under Secretary of State for Energy	Peter Truscott, Baron Truscott	November 2006 - June 2007
Parliamentary Under Secretary of State for Competitiveness	Barry Gardiner	May 2005 - May 2006
Parliamentary Under Secretary of State for Women & Equality	Meg Munn	May 2005 - May 2006
Parliamentary Under Secretary of State for Employment Relations & Consumer Affairs	Gerry Sutcliffe	May 2005 - May 2006
Parliamentary Under-Secretary of State for Employment Relations & Postal Services	Jim Fitzpatrick	May 2006 - June 2007
Minister for London	Jim Fitzpatrick	May 2006 - June 2007

Northern Ireland Office
Secretary of State for Northern Ireland	Peter Hain	May 2005 - June 2007
Minister of State	David Hanson	May 2005 - May 2007
Minister of State	Paul Goggins	May 2007 - June 2007
Minister of State	Jeff Rooker, Baron Rooker	May 2005 - May 2006
Parliamentary Under Secretary of State	Shaun Woodward	May 2005 - May 2006
Parliamentary Under Secretary of State	Angela Smith	May 2005 - May 2006
Parliamentary Under Secretary of State	Maria Eagle	May 2006 - June 2007
Parliamentary Under Secretary of State	Paul Goggins	May 2006 - May 2007
Parliamentary Under Secretary of State	David Cairns (jointly with Scotland Office)	May 2006 - May 2007

Scotland Office
Secretary of State for Scotland	Alistair Darling	May 2005 - May 2006
Secretary of State for Scotland	Douglas Alexander	May 2006 - June 2007
Parliamentary Under Secretary of State	David Cairns (jointly with Northern Ireland Office May 2006 - May 2007)	May 2005 - June 2007

Wales Office
Secretary of State for Wales	Peter Hain	May 2005 - June 2007
Parliamentary Under Secretary of State	Nick Ainger	May 2005 - June 2007

Office of the Deputy Prime Minister
Deputy Prime Minister, Secretary of State for Local Government and the Regions, First Secretary of State	John Prescott	May 2005 - May 2006
Minister for Housing and Planning	Yvette Cooper	May 2005 - May 2006
Minister of State for Local Government	Phil Woolas	May 2005 - May 2006
Minister of State for Communities and Local Government	David Miliband	May 2005 - May 2006
Parliamentary Under Secretary of State	Kay Andrews, Baroness Andrews	May 2005 - May 2006
Parliamentary Under Secretary of State Minister for London	Jim Fitzpatrick	May 2005 - May 2006

=== Law officers ===
Law Officers
Attorney General for England and Wales	Peter Goldsmith, Baron Goldsmith	May 2005 – June 2007
Solicitor General for England and Wales	Mike O'Brien	May 2005 – June 2007
Advocate General for Scotland	Lynda Clark, Baroness Clark of Calton	May 2005 - January 2006
Advocate General for Scotland	Neil Davidson, Baron Davidson of Glen Cova	March 2006 - June 2007

=== Parliament ===
Parliament
Leader of the House of Commons; Lord Keeper of the Privy Seal	Geoff Hoon	May 2005 – May 2006
Leader of the House of Commons; Lord Keeper of the Privy Seal	Jack Straw	May 2006 – June 2007
Deputy Leader of the House of Commons	Nigel Griffiths	May 2005 - March 2007
Deputy Leader of the House of Commons	Paddy Tipping	March 2007 - June 2007
Leader of the House of Lords; Lord President of the Council	Valerie Amos, Baroness Amos	May 2005 – June 2007
Deputy Leader of the House of Lords	Elizabeth Symons, Baroness Symons of Vernham Dean	May 2005 - June 2005
Deputy Leader of the House of Lords	Jeff Rooker, Baron Rooker	June 2005 - June 2007

=== Whips ===
Whips
Government Chief Whip; Parliamentary Secretary to the Treasury	Hilary Armstrong	May 2005 – May 2006
Government Chief Whip; Parliamentary Secretary to the Treasury	Jacqui Smith	May 2006 – June 2007
Treasurer of HM Household; Deputy chief Whip	Bob Ainsworth	May 2005 - June 2007
Comptroller of HM Household; Whip	Thomas McAvoy	May 2005 - June 2007
Vice-Chamberlain of the Household; Whip	John Heppell	May 2005 - June 2007
Junior Lords of the Treasury; Whips	Joan Ryan	May 2005 - May 2006
Junior Lords of the Treasury; Whips	Gillian Merron	May 2005 - May 2006
Junior Lords of the Treasury; Whips	Vernon Coaker	May 2005 - May 2006
Junior Lords of the Treasury; Whips	Tom Watson	May 2005 - May 2006
Junior Lords of the Treasury; Whips	David Watts	May 2005 - June 2007
Junior Lords of the Treasury; Whips	Alan Campbell	May 2006 - June 2007
Junior Lords of the Treasury; Whips	Kevin Brennan	May 2006 - June 2007
Junior Lords of the Treasury; Whips	Claire Ward	May 2006 - June 2007
Junior Lords of the Treasury; Whips	Frank Roy	May 2006 - June 2007
Assistant Whips	Frank Roy	May 2005 - May 2006
Assistant Whips	Ian Cawsey	May 2005 - June 2007
Assistant Whips	Alan Campbell	May 2005 - May 2006
Assistant Whips	Claire Ward	May 2005 - May 2006
Assistant Whips	Parmjit Dhanda	May 2005 - May 2006
Assistant Whips	Tony Cunningham	May 2005 - June 2007
Assistant Whips	Kevin Brennan	May 2005 - May 2006
Assistant Whips	Steve McCabe	May 2006 - June 2007
Assistant Whips	Liz Blackman	May 2006 - June 2007
Assistant Whips	Huw Irranca-Davies	May 2006 - June 2007
Assistant Whips	Jonathan Shaw	May 2006 - June 2007
Assistant Whips	Michael Foster (Worcester MP)	May 2006 - June 2007
Captain of the Honourable Corps of Gentlemen-at-Arms; Chief Whip	Bruce Grocott, Baron Grocott	May 2005 - June 2007
Captain of the Yeomen of the Guard; Deputy Chief Whip	Bryan Davies, Baron Davies of Oldham	May 2005 - June 2007
Lords and Baronesses-in-waiting; Whips	Josephine Farrington, Baroness Farrington of Ribbleton	May 2005 - June 2007
Lords and Baronesses-in-waiting; Whips	Steve Bassam, Baron Bassam of Brighton	May 2005 - June 2007
Lords and Baronesses-in-waiting; Whips	Christine Crawley, Baroness Crawley	May 2005 - June 2007
Lords and Baronesses-in-waiting; Whips	Matthew Evans, Baron Evans of Temple Guiting	May 2005 - June 2007
Lords and Baronesses-in-waiting; Whips	Bill McKenzie, Baron McKenzie of Luton	May 2005 - January 2007
Lords and Baronesses-in-waiting; Whips	Delyth Morgan, Baroness Morgan of Drefelin	January 2007 - June 2007
Lords and Baronesses-in-waiting; Whips	Janet Royall, Baroness Royall of Blaisdon	May 2005 - June 2007

Preceded by Second Blair ministry	Government of the United Kingdom; 2005–2007	Succeeded by Brown ministry
