= Brown ministry =

British government from 2007 to 2010

- Cabinet of the United Kingdom
- 2007–2010
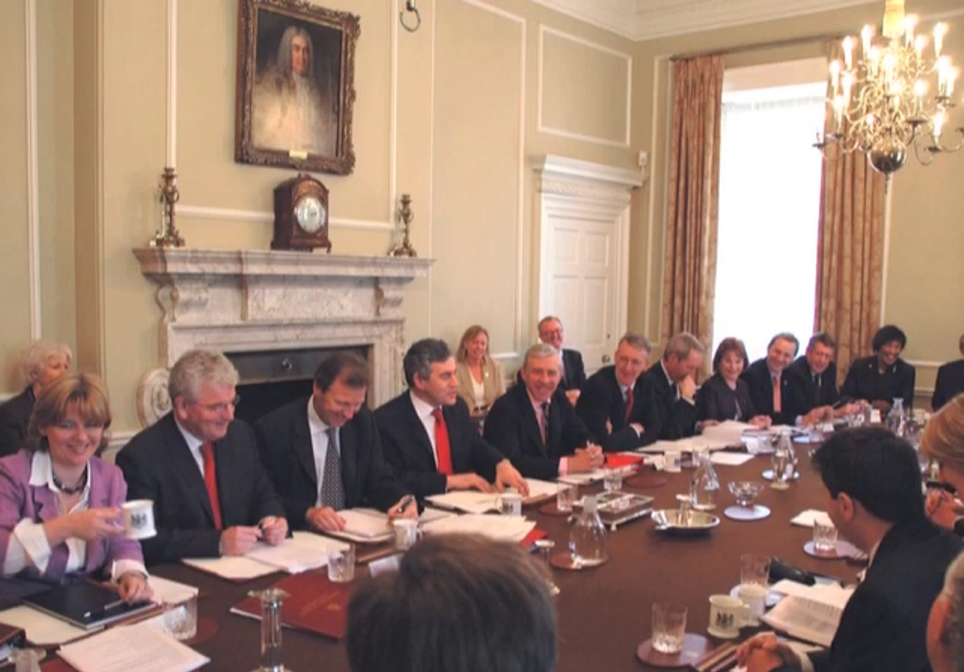
- Brown holding his first cabinet meeting
- Date formed: 27 June 2007
- Date dissolved: 11 May 2010

People and organisations
- Monarch: Elizabeth II
- Prime Minister: Gordon Brown
- First Secretary: Peter Mandelson (2009–2010)
- Member party: Labour Party
- Status in legislature: Majority (2007–2010); Caretaker (May 2010)
- Opposition cabinet: Cameron shadow cabinet
- Opposition party: Conservative Party
- Opposition leader: David Cameron

History
- Incoming formation: 2007 Labour leadership election
- Outgoing formation: 2010 United Kingdom government formation
- Outgoing election: 2010 general election
- Legislature term: 54th UK Parliament
- Budgets: 2008 budget; 2009 budget; March 2010 budget
- Predecessor: Third Blair ministry
- Successor: Cameron–Clegg coalition

Gordon Brown formed the Brown ministry after being invited by Queen Elizabeth II to form a new government following the resignation of the previous Prime Minister of the United Kingdom, Tony Blair, on 27 June 2007. Brown formed his government over the course of the next day, with Jacqui Smith being appointed the United Kingdom's first female Home Secretary.

Following the 2010 general election, which resulted in a hung parliament, the government briefly remained in an acting capacity while negotiations to form a new government took place. After talks between the Labour Party and the Liberal Democrats broke down and a Conservative–Liberal Democrat coalition looked imminent, Brown resigned as prime minister on 11 May 2010.

== Background ==
In comparison with Tony Blair's last Cabinet, Brown retained seventeen ministers including himself.

Alistair Darling replaced Brown as Chancellor of the Exchequer while his portfolio at Trade and Industry was renamed Business, Enterprise and Regulatory Reform and given to John Hutton. Hutton was in turn replaced as Work Secretary by Peter Hain, who continued as Wales Secretary but not as Northern Ireland Secretary, a post that went to Shaun Woodward, previously Parliamentary Under-Secretary of State.

David Miliband was promoted from Environment Secretary to Foreign Secretary and was replaced in that brief by Hilary Benn, then International Development Secretary. Douglas Alexander filled Benn's seat whilst his posts as Transport and Scotland Secretaries were given to Ruth Kelly and Des Browne, respectively, the latter of whom stayed on as Defence Secretary. Jack Straw became the first MP Justice Secretary and Lord Chancellor, declaring it a new Great Office of State. Amid speculation that Brown would appoint him as deputy prime minister and/or First Secretary of State, neither title was conferred on any member. The other name that cropped up for the two roles was the new Labour Party Chair and Deputy Leader, Harriet Harman, who made a return to Cabinet after nine years as Leader of the House of Commons and Lord Privy Seal and was given the additional brief of Minister for Women and Equality. It was believed that the Government Equalities Office would become its own department headed by an Equalities Secretary; however, it was not given Secretary of State status. The previous home of the Equalities Office and of Ruth Kelly was the Communities Secretary, a post which was given to Hazel Blears, whose previous role as Minister without Portfolio was not given due to Harman's (the new party chair) full inclusion in Cabinet. Harman's strongest competitor for the deputy leadership, Alan Johnson, became the Health Secretary while his previous role as Education Secretary was split into a Schools Secretary and a Universities Secretary and respectively given to Ed Balls and John Denham.

Former Commons Chief Whip Jacqui Smith was given a substantial promotion as the first female Home Secretary and was replaced by Geoff Hoon, who was promoted from being the Europe Minister. His successor, Jim Murphy, was not given a provision to attend Cabinet as he was.

Tessa Jowell lost her place at the table when James Purnell became Culture Secretary but was given the right to attend Cabinet as the Olympics Minister and also became Paymaster General. The last holdover from Blair's government was Lord Grocott, who stayed on as Chief Whip in the Lords and Captain of the Gentlemen at Arms. Balls' wife, Yvette Cooper, was given the right to attend Cabinet in her role as Housing Minister as was David Miliband's brother, Ed Miliband, who became Cabinet Minister and Chancellor of the Duchy of Lancaster.

Beverley Hughes retained her role as Children Minister and was elevated to Cabinet, but was only allowed to sit in that body when her policy area was on the agenda. Additionally, Baroness Ashton of Upholland and Andy Burnham entered Cabinet as Lords Leader/Lord President of the Council and Chief Secretary to the Treasury.

Baroness Scotland of Asthal and Lord Malloch-Brown were given the right to attend Cabinet as Attorney General and Africa, Asia and UN Minister.

The last alteration to the Cabinet's composition was the removal of the Minister for Social Exclusion and the Minister of State for Trade.

== Cabinets ==
=== 28 June 2007 – 24 January 2008 ===
First Cabinet of Brown Cabinet
Portfolio	Portrait	Minister
Cabinet ministers
Prime Minister		Gordon Brown
First Lord of the Treasury		Gordon Brown
Minister for the Civil Service		Gordon Brown
Chancellor of the Exchequer		Alistair Darling
Foreign Secretary		David Miliband
Secretary of State for Justice		Jack Straw
Lord High Chancellor of Great Britain		Jack Straw
Home Secretary		Jacqui Smith
Secretary of State for Defence		Des Browne
Secretary of State for Scotland		Des Browne
Secretary of State for Health		Alan Johnson
Secretary of State for Environment, Food and Rural Affairs		Hilary Benn
Secretary of State for International Development		Douglas Alexander
Secretary of State for Business, Enterprise and Regulatory Reform		John Hutton
Leader of the House of Commons		Harriet Harman
Lord Keeper of the Privy Seal		Harriet Harman
Minister for Women and Equality		Harriet Harman
Secretary of State for Work and Pensions		Peter Hain
Secretary of State for Wales		Peter Hain
Secretary of State for Transport		Ruth Kelly
Secretary of State for Communities and Local Government		Hazel Blears
Secretary of State for Children, Schools and Families		Ed Balls
Minister for the Cabinet Office		Ed Miliband
Chancellor of the Duchy of Lancaster		Ed Miliband
Secretary of State for Culture, Media and Sport		James Purnell
Secretary of State for Northern Ireland		Shaun Woodward
Leader of the House of Lords		Catherine Ashton, Baroness Ashton of Upholland
Lord President of the Council		Catherine Ashton, Baroness Ashton of Upholland
Chief Secretary to the Treasury		Andy Burnham
Secretary of State for Innovation, Universities and Skills		John Denham
Chief Whip of the House of Commons		Geoff Hoon
Parliamentary Secretary to the Treasury		Geoff Hoon
Also attending cabinet meetings
Chief Whip of the House of Lords		Bruce Grocott, Baron Grocott
Captain of the Honourable Corps of Gentlemen at Arms		Bruce Grocott, Baron Grocott
Attorney General		Patricia Scotland, Baroness Scotland of Asthal
Minister of State for Africa, Asia and the United Nations		Mark Malloch Brown, Baron Malloch-Brown
Minister of State for Housing and Planning		Yvette Cooper
Minister for the Olympics		Tessa Jowell
Paymaster General		Tessa Jowell
Also attending cabinet meetings when their ministerial responsibilities are on the agenda
Minister of State for Children, Young People and Families		Beverley Hughes

=== First reshuffle: 24 January 2008 – 3 October 2008 ===
Second Cabinet of Brown Cabinet
Portfolio	Portrait	Minister
Cabinet ministers
Prime Minister		Gordon Brown
First Lord of the Treasury		Gordon Brown
Minister for the Civil Service		Gordon Brown
Chancellor of the Exchequer		Alistair Darling
Foreign Secretary		David Miliband
Secretary of State for Justice		Jack Straw
Lord High Chancellor of Great Britain		Jack Straw
Home Secretary		Jacqui Smith
Secretary of State for Defence		Des Browne
Secretary of State for Scotland		Des Browne
Secretary of State for Health		Alan Johnson
Secretary of State for Environment, Food and Rural Affairs		Hilary Benn
Secretary of State for International Development		Douglas Alexander
Secretary of State for Business, Enterprise and Regulatory Reform		John Hutton
Leader of the House of Commons		Harriet Harman
Lord Keeper of the Privy Seal		Harriet Harman
Minister for Women and Equality		Harriet Harman
Secretary of State for Work and Pensions		James Purnell
Secretary of State for Transport		Ruth Kelly
Secretary of State for Communities and Local Government		Hazel Blears
Chief Whip of the House of Commons		Geoff Hoon
Parliamentary Secretary to the Treasury		Geoff Hoon
Secretary of State for Children, Schools and Families		Ed Balls
Minister for the Cabinet Office		Ed Miliband
Chancellor of the Duchy of Lancaster		Ed Miliband
Secretary of State for Culture, Media and Sport		Andy Burnham
Secretary of State for Northern Ireland		Shaun Woodward
Secretary of State for Wales		Paul Murphy
Leader of the House of Lords		Catherine Ashton, Baroness Ashton of Upholland
Lord President of the Council		Catherine Ashton, Baroness Ashton of Upholland
Chief Secretary to the Treasury		Yvette Cooper
Secretary of State for Innovation, Universities and Skills		John Denham
Also attending cabinet meetings
Attorney General		Patricia Scotland, Baroness Scotland of Asthal
Minister of State for Africa, Asia and the United Nations		Mark Malloch Brown, Baron Malloch-Brown
Minister of State for Housing and Planning		Caroline Flint
Minister for the Olympics		Tessa Jowell
Paymaster General		Tessa Jowell
Chief Whip of the House of Lords		Janet Royall, Baroness Royall of Blaisdon
Captain of the Honourable Corps of Gentlemen at Arms		Janet Royall, Baroness Royall of Blaisdon
Also attending cabinet meetings when their ministerial responsibilities are on the agenda
Minister of State for Children, Young People and Families		Beverley Hughes

=== Second reshuffle: 3 October 2008 – 5 June 2009 ===
Third Cabinet of Brown Cabinet
Portfolio	Portrait	Minister
Cabinet ministers
Prime Minister		Gordon Brown
First Lord of the Treasury		Gordon Brown
Minister for the Civil Service		Gordon Brown
Chancellor of the Exchequer		Alistair Darling
Foreign Secretary		David Miliband
Secretary of State for Justice		Jack Straw
Lord High Chancellor of Great Britain		Jack Straw
Home Secretary		Jacqui Smith
Secretary of State for Health		Alan Johnson
Secretary of State for Business, Enterprise and Regulatory Reform		The Lord Mandelson
Secretary of State for Environment, Food and Rural Affairs		Hilary Benn
Secretary of State for International Development		Douglas Alexander
Secretary of State for Defence		John Hutton
Leader of the House of Commons		Harriet Harman
Lord Keeper of the Privy Seal		Harriet Harman
Minister for Women and Equality		Harriet Harman
Secretary of State for Communities and Local Government		Hazel Blears
Secretary of State for Transport		Geoff Hoon
Secretary of State for Children, Schools and Families		Ed Balls
Secretary of State for Energy and Climate Change		Ed Miliband
Secretary of State for Work and Pensions		James Purnell
Secretary of State for Northern Ireland		Shaun Woodward
Leader of the House of Lords		Janet Royall, Baroness Royall of Blaisdon
Lord President of the Council		Janet Royall, Baroness Royall of Blaisdon
Secretary of State for Culture, Media and Sport		Andy Burnham
Secretary of State for Innovation, Universities and Skills		John Denham
Chief Secretary to the Treasury		Yvette Cooper
Secretary of State for Wales		Paul Murphy
Secretary of State for Scotland		Jim Murphy
Also attending cabinet meetings
Chief Whip of the House of Commons		Nick Brown
Parliamentary Secretary to the Treasury		Nick Brown
Minister for the Cabinet Office		Liam Byrne
Chancellor of the Duchy of Lancaster		Liam Byrne
Minister of State for Housing and Planning		Margaret Beckett
Minister of State for Employment and Welfare Reform		Tony McNulty
Minister of State for Africa, Asia and the United Nations		Mark Malloch Brown, Baron Malloch-Brown
Minister of State for Science and Innovation		Paul Drayson, Baron Drayson
Also attending cabinet meetings when their ministerial responsibilities are on the agenda
Minister for the Olympics		Tessa Jowell
Paymaster General		Tessa Jowell
Attorney General		Patricia Scotland, Baroness Scotland of Asthal
Minister for Europe		Caroline Flint
Minister of State for Children, Young People and Families		Beverley Hughes

=== Third reshuffle: 5 June 2009 – 11 May 2010 ===
Fourth Cabinet of Brown Cabinet
Portfolio	Portrait	Minister
Cabinet ministers
Prime Minister		Gordon Brown
First Lord of the Treasury		Gordon Brown
Minister for the Civil Service		Gordon Brown
Leader of the House of Commons		Harriet Harman
Lord Keeper of the Privy Seal		Harriet Harman
Minister for Women and Equality		Harriet Harman
First Secretary of State		The Lord Mandelson
Secretary of State for Business, Innovation and Skills		The Lord Mandelson
Lord President of the Council		The Lord Mandelson
Chancellor of the Exchequer		Alistair Darling
Foreign Secretary		David Miliband
Secretary of State for Justice		Jack Straw
Lord High Chancellor of Great Britain		Jack Straw
Home Secretary		Alan Johnson
Secretary of State for Environment, Food and Rural Affairs		Hilary Benn
Secretary of State for International Development		Douglas Alexander
Secretary of State for Communities and Local Government		John Denham
Secretary of State for Children, Schools and Families		Ed Balls
Secretary of State for Energy and Climate Change		Ed Miliband
Secretary of State for Health		Andy Burnham
Secretary of State for Northern Ireland		Shaun Woodward
Leader of the House of Lords		Janet Royall, Baroness Royall of Blaisdon
Chancellor of the Duchy of Lancaster		Janet Royall, Baroness Royall of Blaisdon
Minister for the Cabinet Office		Tessa Jowell
Minister for the Olympics		Tessa Jowell
Paymaster General		Tessa Jowell
Secretary of State for Scotland		Jim Murphy
Secretary of State for Work and Pensions		Yvette Cooper
Chief Secretary to the Treasury		Liam Byrne
Secretary of State for Wales		Peter Hain
Secretary of State for Defence		Bob Ainsworth
Secretary of State for Transport		Andrew Adonis, Baron Adonis
Secretary of State for Culture, Media and Sport		Ben Bradshaw
Also attending cabinet meetings
Chief Whip of the House of Commons		Nick Brown
Parliamentary Secretary to the Treasury		Nick Brown
Minister of State for Africa, Asia and the United Nations		Mark Malloch Brown, Baron Malloch-Brown (Note: Lord Malloch-Brown resigned on 24 July 2009 after the general reshuffle and the portfolio is no longer in Cabinet.)
Minister of State for Housing and Planning		John Healey
Minister of State for Business, Innovation and Skills		Pat McFadden
Minister of State for Science and Innovation		Paul Drayson, Baron Drayson
Minister of State for Strategic Defence Acquisition Reform (Note: This portfolio was added to Cabinet on 8 June 2009 after the general reshuffle.)		Paul Drayson, Baron Drayson
Minister of State for Employment and Welfare Reform		Jim Knight
Also attending cabinet meetings when their ministerial responsibilities are on the agenda
Attorney General		Patricia Scotland, Baroness Scotland of Asthal
Minister of State for Children, Young People and Families		Dawn Primarolo
Minister of State for Regional Economic Development and Coordination		Rosie Winterton
Minister of State for Local Government		Rosie Winterton
Minister of State for Transport		Sadiq Khan

== List of ministers ==
Key:

Minister in the House of Commons
Minister in the House of Lords

=== Prime minister ===
Prime Minister
Prime Minister of the United Kingdom; First Lord of the Treasury; Minister for the Civil Service	Gordon Brown	June 2007 – May 2010
Parliamentary Private Secretary to the Prime Minister	Ian Austin	June 2007 – October 2008
Parliamentary Private Secretary to the Prime Minister	Jon Trickett	October 2008 – May 2010
Parliamentary Private Secretary to the Prime Minister	Angela Smith	June 2007 – June 2009
Parliamentary Private Secretary to the Prime Minister	Anne Snelgrove	June 2009 – May 2010

=== Business, Enterprise and Regulatory Reform ===
Business, Enterprise & Regulatory Reform Until June 2009
Secretary of State for Business, Enterprise & Regulatory Reform	John Hutton	June 2007 – October 2008
Secretary of State for Business, Enterprise & Regulatory Reform	The Lord Mandelson	October 2008 – June 2009
Minister of State for Competitiveness	Stephen Timms	June 2007 – January 2008
Minister of State for Competitiveness	Shriti Vadera, Baroness Vadera (jointly with Business)	January 2008 – June 2009
Minister for Trade & Investment	Digby Jones, Baron Jones of Birmingham (with Foreign Office)	June 2007 – October 2008
Minister for Trade & Investment	Gareth Thomas	October 2008 – June 2009
Minister for Trade & Investment	Mervyn Davies, Baron Davies of Abersoch (with Foreign Office)	February–June 2009
Minister of State for Employment Relations	Pat McFadden	June 2007 – June 2009
Minister of State for Energy	Malcolm Wicks	June 2007 – October 2008
Parliamentary Under-Secretary of State for Trade & Consumer Affairs	Gareth Thomas (with International Development)	June 2007 – October 2008
Minister of State	Paul Drayson, Baron Drayson (with Defence)	June–November 2007
Parliamentary Under-Secretary of State, Minister for Communications	Stephen Carter, Baron Carter of Barnes (with Culture)	October 2008 – June 2009
Parliamentary Under-Secretary of State for Economics & Business	Ian Pearson (with the Treasury)	October 2008 – June 2009

=== Business, Innovation and Skills ===
Business, Innovation and Skills (merged with Innovation and Skills from June 2009)
Secretary of State for Business, Innovation and Skills; First Secretary of State; Lord President of the Council	The Lord Mandelson	June 2009 – May 2010
Minister of State for Business, Innovation, and Skills (attends Cabinet)	Pat McFadden	June 2009 – May 2010
Minister of State for Regional Economic Development and Coordination (jointly with Communities and Local Government)	Rosie Winterton (also Minister for Yorkshire & The Humber)	June 2009 – May 2010
Minister of State for Higher Education and Intellectual Property	David Lammy	June 2009 – May 2010
Minister of State for Further Education, Skills, Apprenticeships and Consumer Affairs (jointly with Children, Schools & Families)	Kevin Brennan	June 2009 – May 2010
Parliamentary Under-Secretary of State for Digital Britain (jointly with the Treasury)	Stephen Timms	August 2009 – May 2010
Parliamentary Under-Secretary of State for Business and Regulatory Reform	Ian Lucas	June 2009 – May 2010
Minister of State for Science and Innovation (attends Cabinet; jointly with Defence)	Paul Drayson, Baron Drayson (Unpaid)	June 2009 – May 2010
Parliamentary Under-Secretary of State (jointly with Cabinet Office)	Shriti Vadera, Baroness Vadera	June–September 2009
Minister of State for Trade, Investment, and Small Business (jointly with FCO)	Mervyn Davies, Baron Davies of Abersoch (Unpaid)	June 2009 – May 2010
Parliamentary Under-Secretary of State for Postal Affairs and Employment Relations	Anthony Young, Baron Young of Norwood Green (Unpaid)	June 2009 – May 2010
Parliamentary Under-Secretary of State for Communications (jointly with Culture)	Stephen Carter, Baron Carter of Barnes	June–July 2009

=== Cabinet Office ===
Cabinet Office
Minister for the Cabinet Office (June 2009 – May 2010); Paymaster General (June 2007 – May 2010); Minister for the Olympics (June 2007 – May 2010)	Tessa Jowell	June 2007 – May 2010
Minister of State for the Third Sector	Angela Smith	June 2009 – May 2010
Minister for the Cabinet Office, Chancellor of the Duchy of Lancaster	Ed Miliband	June 2007 – October 2008
Minister for the Cabinet Office, Chancellor of the Duchy of Lancaster	Liam Byrne	October 2008 – June 2009
Minister for London	Tessa Jowell	June 2007 – October 2008
Minister for London	Tony McNulty	October 2008 – June 2009
Minister for London	Tessa Jowell	June 2009 – May 2010
Parliamentary Secretary for the Cabinet Office	Phil Hope (also Minister for the East Midlands Jan 2008 – May 2010)	June 2007 – October 2008
Parliamentary Secretary for the Cabinet Office	Kevin Brennan	October 2008 – June 2009
Parliamentary Secretary for the Cabinet Office	Gillian Merron (also Minister for the East Midlands June 2007 – Jan 2008	June 2007 – Jan 2008
Parliamentary Secretary for the Cabinet Office	Tom Watson (Minister for Digital Engagement & Civil Service Issues)	January 2008 – June 2009
Parliamentary Secretary for the Cabinet Office	Dawn Butler (Minister for Young Citizens & Youth Engagement)	October 2009 – May 2010
Parliamentary Secretary for the Cabinet Office	Shriti Vadera, Baroness Vadera	October 2008 – September 2009
Chancellor of the Duchy of Lancaster	Janet Royall, Baroness Royall of Blaisdon	June 2009 – May 2010

=== Children, Schools and Families ===
Children, Schools and Families
Secretary of State for Children, Schools and Families	Ed Balls	June 2007 – May 2010
Minister of State for Schools and Learners	Jim Knight	June 2007 – June 2009
Minister of State for Schools and Learners	Vernon Coaker	June 2009 – May 2010
Minister of State for Children, Young People, and Families	Beverley Hughes (also Minister for the North West)	June 2007 – June 2009
Minister of State for Children, Young People, and Families	Dawn Primarolo (attends Cabinet)	June 2009 – May 2010
Minister of State for Further Education, Skills, and Apprenticeship (jointly with Business)	Kevin Brennan	June 2009 – May 2010
Parliamentary Under-Secretary of State for Schools	Andrew Adonis, Baron Adonis	June 2007 – October 2008
Parliamentary Under-Secretary of State for Schools	Sarah McCarthy-Fry	October 2008 – June 2009
Parliamentary Under-Secretary of State for Schools	Diana Johnson (Unpaid)	June 2009 – May 2010
Parliamentary Under-Secretary of State for 14–19 Reform and Apprenticeships	Iain Wright	June 2009 – May 2010
Parliamentary Under-Secretary of State for Children, Families, and Schools	Kevin Brennan	June 2007 – October 2008
Parliamentary Under-Secretary of State for Children, Families, and Schools	Delyth Morgan, Baroness Morgan of Drefelin	October 2008 – May 2010

=== Communities and Local Government ===
Communities and Local Government
Secretary of State for Communities and Local Government	Hazel Blears	June 2007 – June 2009
Secretary of State for Communities and Local Government	John Denham	June 2009 – May 2010
Minister of State for Housing and Planning (attends Cabinet)	Yvette Cooper	June 2007 – January 2008
Minister of State for Housing and Planning (attends Cabinet)	Caroline Flint	January – October 2008
Minister of State for Housing and Planning (attends Cabinet)	Margaret Beckett	October 2008 – June 2009
Minister of State for Housing and Planning (attends Cabinet)	John Healey	June 2009 – May 2010
Minister of State for Local Government	John Healey	June 2007 – June 2009
Minister of State for Local Government; Minister for Yorkshire and the Humber (attends Cabinet; jointly with Business)	Rosie Winterton	June 2009 – May 2010
Parliamentary Under-Secretary of State	Parmjit Dhanda	June 2007 – October 2008
Parliamentary Under-Secretary of State	Sadiq Khan	October 2008 – June 2009
Parliamentary Under-Secretary of State	Shahid Malik	June 2009 – May 2010
Parliamentary Under-Secretary of State	Iain Wright	June 2007 – June 2009
Parliamentary Under-Secretary of State	Ian Austin (also Minister for the West Midlands)	June 2009 – May 2010
Parliamentary Under-Secretary of State	Sarah McCarthy-Fry	June 10–18th 2009
Parliamentary Under-Secretary of State	Barbara Follett (also Minister for the East of England)	September 2009 – May 2010
Parliamentary Under-Secretary of State	Kay Andrews, Baroness Andrews	June 2007 – June 2009
Parliamentary Under-Secretary of State	Bill McKenzie, Baron McKenzie of Luton (jointly with Work & Pensions)	June 2009 – May 2010

=== Culture, Media and Sport ===
Culture, Media and Sport
Secretary of State for Culture, Media and Sport	James Purnell	June 2007 – January 2008
Secretary of State for Culture, Media and Sport	Andy Burnham	January 2008 – June 2009
Secretary of State for Culture, Media and Sport	Ben Bradshaw	June 2009 – May 2010
Minister of State for Culture and Tourism	Margaret Hodge	June 2007 – October 2008
Minister of State for Culture and Tourism	Barbara Follett (also Minister for the East of England)	October 2008 – September 2009
Minister of State for Culture and Tourism	Margaret Hodge	September 2009 – May 2010
Parliamentary Under-Secretary of State for Sport	Gerry Sutcliffe	June 2007 – May 2010
Parliamentary Under-Secretary of State for Creative Industries	Siôn Simon (Unpaid)	June 2009 – May 2010
Minister for Communications (jointly with Business)	Stephen Carter, Baron Carter of Barnes	October 2008 – July 2009

=== Defence ===
Defence
Secretary of State for Defence	Des Browne	June 2007 – October 2008
Secretary of State for Defence	John Hutton	October 2008 – June 2009
Secretary of State for Defence	Bob Ainsworth	June 2009 – May 2010
Minister of State for the Armed Forces	Bob Ainsworth	June 2007 – June 2009
Minister of State for the Armed Forces	Bill Rammell	June 2009 – May 2010
Parliamentary Under-Secretary of State for Defence Equipment and Support	Paul Drayson, Baron Drayson (Jointly with Business)	June–November 2007
Parliamentary Under-Secretary of State for Defence Equipment and Support	Ann Taylor, Baroness Taylor of Bolton	November 2007 – October 2008
Parliamentary Under-Secretary of State for Defence Equipment and Support	Quentin Davies (Unpaid)	October 2008 – May 2010
Parliamentary Under-Secretary of State for Veterans	Derek Twigg	June 2007 – October 2008
Parliamentary Under-Secretary of State for Veterans	Kevan Jones	October 2008 – May 2010
Minister of State for Strategic Defence Acquisition Reform (jointly with Business)	Paul Drayson, Baron Drayson (attends Cabinet, Unpaid)	June 2009 – May 2010
Parliamentary Under-Secretary of State for International Defence and Security (jointly with FCO)	Ann Taylor, Baroness Taylor of Bolton	October 2008 – May 2010

=== Energy and Climate Change ===
Energy and Climate Change (New Department October 2008)
Secretary of State for Energy and Climate Change	Ed Miliband	October 2008 – May 2010
Minister of State	Mike O'Brien	October 2008 – June 2009
Minister of State	Joan Ruddock	June 2009 – May 2010
Parliamentary Under-Secretary of State	Joan Ruddock	October 2008 – June 2009
Parliamentary Under-Secretary of State	David Kidney (Unpaid)	June 2009 – May 2010
Minister of State (also Deputy Leader of the House of Lords) (jointly with Environment)	Philip Hunt, Baron Hunt of Kings Heath	October 2008 – May 2010

=== Environment, Food and Rural Affairs ===
Environment, Food and Rural Affairs
Secretary of State for Environment, Food and Rural Affairs	Hilary Benn	June 2007 – May 2010
Minister of State for the Environment	Phil Woolas	June 2007 – October 2008
Minister of State for the Environment	Philip Hunt, Baron Hunt of Kings Heath	October 2008 – May 2010
Minister of State for Farming	Jeff Rooker, Baron Rooker	June 2007 – October 2008
Minister of State for Farming	Jane Kennedy	October 2008 – June 2009
Minister of State for Farming	Jim Fitzpatrick	June 2009 – May 2010
Parliamentary Under-Secretary of State for Marine	Jonathan Shaw (also Minister for the South East)	June 2007 – October 2008
Parliamentary Under-Secretary of State for Marine	Huw Irranca-Davies	October 2008 – May 2010
Parliamentary Under-Secretary of State for Rural Affairs and Environment	Joan Ruddock	June 2007 – October 2008
Parliamentary Under-Secretary of State for Rural Affairs and Environment	Dan Norris (Unpaid)	June 2009 – May 2010
Parliamentary Under-Secretary of State	Bryan Davies, Baron Davies of Oldham	June 2009 – May 2010

=== Foreign and Commonwealth Affairs ===
Foreign and Commonwealth Affairs
Foreign Secretary	David Miliband	June 2007 – May 2010
Minister of State for the Middle East	Kim Howells	June 2007 – October 2008
Minister of State for the Middle East	Bill Rammell	October 2008 – June 2009
Minister of State for the Middle East	Ivan Lewis	June 2009 – May 2010
Minister of State for Europe	Jim Murphy	June 2007 – October 2008
Minister of State for Europe	Caroline Flint	October 2008 – June 2009
Minister of State for Europe	Glenys Kinnock, Baroness Kinnock of Holyhead	June–October 2009
Parliamentary Under-Secretary of State for Europe and Asia	Chris Bryant	June 2009 – May 2010
Parliamentary Under Secretary of State	Meg Munn	June 2007 – October 2008
Parliamentary Under Secretary of State	Gillian Merron	October 2008 – June 2009
Minister of State for Africa, Asia and the UN	Mark Malloch Brown, Baron Malloch Brown (attends Cabinet)	June 2007 – July 2009
Minister of State for Trade & Investment (with Business)	Digby Jones, Baron Jones of Birmingham	June 2007 – October 2008
Minister of State for Africa and the UN	Glenys Kinnock, Baroness Kinnock of Holyhead	October 2009 – May 2010
Minister of State for Trade, Investment and Business (jointly with Business)	Mervyn Davies, Baron Davies of Abersoch (Unpaid)	February 2009 – May 2010
Parliamentary Under-Secretary of State (jointly with Defence)	Ann Taylor, Baroness Taylor of Bolton	October 2008 – May 2010

=== Government Equalities Office ===
Minister for Women and Equality
Minister for Women and Equality	Harriet Harman	October 2007 – May 2010
Minister of State	Maria Eagle (jointly with Justice)	June 2009 – May 2010
Parliamentary Secretary	Barbara Follett (also Minister for the East of England)	October 2007 – October 2008
Parliamentary Secretary	Maria Eagle	October 2008 – June 2009
Parliamentary Secretary	Michael Jabez Foster (Unpaid)	June 2009 – May 2010

=== Health ===
Health
Secretary of State for Health	Alan Johnson	June 2007 – June 2009
Secretary of State for Health	Andy Burnham	June 2009 – May 2010
Minister of State for Health Services	Ben Bradshaw (also Minister for the South West)	June 2007 – June 2009
Minister of State for Health Services	Mike O'Brien	June 2009 – May 2010
Minister of State for Public Health	Dawn Primarolo	June 2007 – June 2009
Minister of State for Public Health	Gillian Merron	June 2009 – May 2010
Minister of State for Care Services	Ivan Lewis	June 2007 – October 2008
Minister of State for Care Services	Phil Hope (also Minister for the East Midlands)	October 2008 – May 2010
Parliamentary Under-Secretary of State for Health Services	Ann Keen	June 2007 – May 2010
Parliamentary Under-Secretary of State	Vacant with the resignation of Ara Darzi, Baron Darzi of Denham	June 2007 – July 2009
Parliamentary Under-Secretary of State	Glenys Thornton, Baroness Thornton	February 2010 – May 2010

=== Home Affairs ===
Home Affairs
Home Secretary	Jacqui Smith	June 2007 – June 2009
Home Secretary	Alan Johnson	June 2009 – May 2010
Minister of State for Borders and Immigration	Liam Byrne (also Minister for the West Midlands)	June 2007 – October 2008
Minister of State for Borders and Immigration	Phil Woolas (also Minister for the North West from June 2009)	October 2008 – May 2010
Minister of State for Crime and Policing	Tony McNulty	June 2007 – October 2008
Minister of State for Crime and Policing	Vernon Coaker	October 2008 – June 2009
Minister of State for Crime and Policing	David Hanson	June 2009 – May 2010
Parliamentary Under-Secretary of State for Identity	Meg Hillier	June 2007 – May 2010
Parliamentary Under-Secretary of State for Identity	Bill Brett, Baron Brett (cover for Meg Hillier's maternity leave)	August 2008 – November 2009
Parliamentary Under-Secretary of State for Crime Reduction	Vernon Coaker	June 2007 – October 2008
Parliamentary Under-Secretary of State for Crime Reduction	Alan Campbell	October 2008 – May 2010
Parliamentary Under-Secretary of State for Security and Counter-terrorism	Alan West, Baron West of Spithead	June 2007 – May 2010

=== Innovation, Universities and Skills ===
Innovation, Universities and Skills (merged with Business in June 2009)
Secretary of State for Innovation, Universities and Skills	John Denham	June 2007 – June 2009
Minister of State for Science and Innovation	Ian Pearson	June 2007 – October 2008
Minister of State for Science and Innovation	Paul Drayson, Baron Drayson	October 2008 – June 2009
Minister of State for Lifelong Learning, Further and Higher Education	Bill Rammell	June 2007 – October 2008
Minister of State for Lifelong Learning, Further and Higher Education	David Lammy	October 2008 – June 2009
Parliamentary Under-Secretary of State for Skills	David Lammy	June 2007 – October 2008
Parliamentary Under-Secretary of State for Skills	Sion Simon	October 2008 – June 2009
Parliamentary Under-Secretary of State for Intellectual Property & Quality	David Triesman, Baron Triesman	June 2007 – January 2008
Parliamentary Under-Secretary of State for Intellectual Property & Quality	Delyth Morgan, Baroness Morgan of Drefelin (Unpaid)	January–October 2008
Parliamentary Under Secretary of State	Anthony Young, Baron Young of Norwood Green	October 2008 – June 2009

=== International Development ===
International Development
Secretary of State for International Development	Douglas Alexander	June 2007 – May 2010
Parliamentary Under-Secretary of State (with Business)	Gareth Thomas	June 2007 – October 2008
Minister of State (with Business)	Gareth Thomas	October 2008 – May 2010
Parliamentary Under-Secretary of State	Shahid Malik (Unpaid)	June 2007 – October 2008
Parliamentary Under-Secretary of State	Michael Foster	October 2008 – May 2010
Parliamentary Under-Secretary of State	Shriti Vadera, Baroness Vadera	June 2007 – January 2008
Parliamentary Under-Secretary of State	Gillian Merron	January -October 2008
Minister of State	Ivan Lewis	October 2008 – June 2009

=== Justice ===
Justice
Lord High Chancellor of Great Britain; Secretary of State for Justice	Jack Straw	June 2007 – May 2010
Minister of State	David Hanson	June 2007 – June 2009
Minister of State	Maria Eagle (jointly with Equalities)	June 2009 – May 2010
Minister of State	Michael Wills	June 2007 – May 2010
Parliamentary Under-Secretary of State	Maria Eagle (jointly with Equalities)	June 2007 – June 2009
Parliamentary Under-Secretary of State	Bridget Prentice	June 2007 – May 2010
Parliamentary Under-Secretary of State	Shahid Malik	October 2008 – May 2009
Parliamentary Under-Secretary of State	Claire Ward	June 2009 – May 2010
Parliamentary Under-Secretary of State	Philip Hunt, Baron Hunt of Kings Heath	June 2007 – October 2008
Parliamentary Under-Secretary of State	Willy Bach, Baron Bach	October 2008 – May 2010

=== Law Officers ===
Law Officers
Attorney General for England and Wales	Patricia Scotland, Baroness Scotland of Asthal	June 2007 – May 2010
Attorney General for Northern Ireland	Patricia Scotland, Baroness Scotland of Asthal	June 2007 – April 2010
Advocate General for Northern Ireland	Patricia Scotland, Baroness Scotland of Asthal	April 2010 – May 2010
Advocate General for Scotland (also Scotland Office)	Neil Davidson, Baron Davidson of Glen Clova	June 2007 – May 2010
Solicitor General for England and Wales	Vera Baird	June 2007 – May 2010

=== Northern Ireland Office ===
Northern Ireland Office
Secretary of State for Northern Ireland	Shaun Woodward	June 2007 – May 2010
Minister of State	Paul Goggins	June 2007 – May 2010

=== Parliament ===
Parliament
Leader of the House of Commons; Lord Keeper of the Privy Seal	Harriet Harman (also minister for Women)	June 2007 – May 2010
Deputy Leader of the Commons	Helen Goodman (Unpaid)	June 2007 – October 2008
Deputy Leader of the Commons	Chris Bryant	October 2008 – June 2009
Deputy Leader of the Commons	Barbara Keeley	June 2009 – May 2010
Leader of the House of Lords; Lord President of the Council	Catherine Ashton, Baroness Ashton of Upholland	June 2007 – October 2008
Leader of the House of Lords; Lord President of the Council (October 2008 – June 2009); Chancellor of the Duchy of Lancaster (June 2009 – May 2010)	Janet Royall, Baroness Royall of Blaisdon	October 2008 – May 2010
Deputy Leader of the Lords	Jeff Rooker, Baron Rooker	June 2007 – October 2008
Deputy Leader of the Lords	Philip Hunt, Baron Hunt of Kings Heath (also in Energy)	October 2008 – May 2010

=== Ministers for the Regions ===
Ministers for the Regions
Minister for the North East of England	Nick Brown (also Chief Whip)	June 2007 – 2010
Minister for the North West of England	Beverley Hughes	June 2007 – June 2009
Minister for the North West of England	Phil Woolas (also Minister of State for the Treasury and the Home Office)	June 2009 – May 2010
Minister for Yorkshire & the Humber	Caroline Flint	June 2007 – January 2008
Minister for Yorkshire & the Humber	Rosie Winterton (also Minister of State for Transport)	January 2008 – May 2010
Minister for London	Tessa Jowell	June 2007 – October 2008
Minister for London	Tony McNulty	October 2008 – June 2009
Minister for London	Tessa Jowell	June 2009 – May 2010
Minister for the South East of England	Jonathan Shaw	June 2007 – May 2010
Minister for the South West of England	Ben Bradshaw	June 2007 – June 2009
Minister for the South West of England	Jim Knight	June 2009 – May 2010
Minister for the East Midlands of England	Gillian Merron	June 2007 – January 2008
Minister for the East Midlands of England	Phil Hope (also Minister of State for Care Services)	January 2008 – May 2010
Minister for the West Midlands of England	Liam Byrne (also Minister of State for Treasury and Home Office)	June 2007 – October 2008
Minister for the West Midlands of England	Ian Austin (also Assistant Whip)	October 2008 – May 2010
Minister for the East of England	Barbara Follett	June 2007 – May 2010

=== Scotland Office ===
Scotland Office
Secretary of State for Scotland	Des Browne	June 2007 – October 2008
Secretary of State for Scotland	Jim Murphy	October 2008 – May 2010
Parliamentary Under-Secretary of State	David Cairns	June 2007 – September 2008
Parliamentary Under-Secretary of State	Ann McKechin	September 2008 – May 2010
Spokesman in the House of Lords (also Advocate General)	Neil Davidson, Baron Davidson of Glen Clova	June 2007 – May 2010

=== Transport ===
Transport
Secretary of State for Transport	Ruth Kelly	June 2007 – October 2008
Secretary of State for Transport	Geoff Hoon	October 2008 – June 2009
Secretary of State for Transport	Andrew Adonis, Baron Adonis	June 2009 – May 2010
Minister of State	Rosie Winterton (also Minister for Yorkshire & The Humber from January 2008)	June 2007 – October 2008
Minister of State	Andrew Adonis, Baron Adonis	October 2008 – June 2009
Minister of State	Sadiq Khan (attends cabinet)	June 2009 – May 2010
Parliamentary Under-Secretary of State	Tom Harris	June 2007 – October 2008
Parliamentary Under-Secretary of State	Paul Clark	October 2008 – May 2010
Parliamentary Under-Secretary of State	Jim Fitzpatrick	June 2007 – June 2009
Parliamentary Under-Secretary of State	Chris Mole	June 2009 – May 2010

=== Treasury ===
Treasury
Chancellor of the Exchequer; Second Lord of the Treasury	Alistair Darling	June 2007 – May 2010
Chief Secretary to the Treasury	Andy Burnham	June 2007 – January 2008
Chief Secretary to the Treasury	Yvette Cooper	January 2008 – June 2009
Chief Secretary to the Treasury	Liam Byrne	June 2009 – May 2010
Financial Secretary to the Treasury	Jane Kennedy	June 2007 – October 2008
Financial Secretary to the Treasury	Stephen Timms (jointly with Business)	October 2008 – May 2010
Exchequer Secretary to the Treasury	Angela Eagle	June 2007 – June 2009
Exchequer Secretary to the Treasury	Kitty Ussher	June 9–17, 2009
Exchequer Secretary to the Treasury	Sarah McCarthy-Fry	June 2009 – May 2010
Economic Secretary to the Treasury	Kitty Ussher	June 2007 – October 2008
Economic Secretary to the Treasury	Ian Pearson (jointly with Business until June 2009)	October 2008 – May 2010
Minister of State (jointly with Home Office)	Liam Byrne (also Minister for the West Midlands)	January- October 2008
Minister of State (jointly with Home Office)	Phil Woolas (also Minister for the North West 2009–2010)	October 2008 – May 2010
Financial Services Secretary	Paul Myners, Baron Myners	October 2008 – May 2010

=== Wales Office ===
Wales Office
Secretary of State for Wales	Peter Hain	June 2007 – January 2008
Secretary of State for Wales	Paul Murphy	January 2008 – June 2009
Secretary of State for Wales	Peter Hain	June 2009 – May 2010
Parliamentary Under-Secretary of State	Huw Irranca-Davies	June 2007 – October 2008
Parliamentary Under-Secretary of State	Wayne David	October 2008 – May 2010

=== Work and Pensions ===
Work and Pensions
Secretary of State for Work and Pensions	Peter Hain	June 2007 – January 2008
Secretary of State for Work and Pensions	James Purnell	January 2008 – June 2009
Secretary of State for Work and Pensions	Yvette Cooper	June 2009 – May 2010
Minister of State for Employment and Welfare Reform	Caroline Flint (Minister for Yorkshire & The Humber)	June 2007 – January 2008
Minister of State for Employment and Welfare Reform	Stephen Timms	January–October 2008
Minister of State for Employment and Welfare Reform	Tony McNulty	October 2008 – June 2009
Minister of State for Employment and Welfare Reform	Jim Knight (attends Cabinet)	June 2009 – May 2010
Minister of State for Pensions and the Ageing Society	Mike O'Brien	June 2007 – October 2008
Minister of State for Pensions and the Ageing Society	Rosie Winterton (also Minister for Yorkshire & The Humber)	October 2008 – June 2009
Minister of State for Pensions and the Ageing Society	Angela Eagle	June 2009 – May 2010
Parliamentary Under-Secretary of State	James Plaskitt	June 2007 – October 2008
Parliamentary Under-Secretary of State	Kitty Ussher	October 2008 – June 2009
Parliamentary Under-Secretary of State	Helen Goodman	June 2009 – May 2010
Parliamentary Under-Secretary of State for Disabled People	Anne McGuire	June 2007 – October 2008
Parliamentary Under-Secretary of State for Disabled People	Jonathan Shaw (also Minister for the South East)	October 2008 – May 2010
Parliamentary Under-Secretary of State	Barbara Follett (also Minister for the East of England)	June–October 2007
Parliamentary Under-Secretary of State	Bill McKenzie, Baron McKenzie of Luton	June 2007 – May 2010

=== Whips ===
Whips
Parliamentary Secretary to the Treasury; Commons Chief Whip	Geoff Hoon	June 2007 – October 2008
Parliamentary Secretary to the Treasury; Commons Chief Whip	Nick Brown (also Minister for the North East, attends Cabinet)	October 2008 – May 2010
Treasurer of the Household; Deputy Chief Whip	Nick Brown (also Minister for the North East)	June 2007 – October 2008
Treasurer of the Household; Deputy Chief Whip	Thomas McAvoy	October 2008 – May 2010
Comptroller of the Household; Whip	Thomas McAvoy	June 2007 – October 2008
Comptroller of the Household; Whip	John Spellar	October 2008 – May 2010
Vice-Chamberlain of the Household; Whip	Liz Blackman	June 2007 – October 2008
Vice-Chamberlain of the Household; Whip	Claire Ward	October 2008 – June 2009
Vice-Chamberlain of the Household; Whip	Helen Jones	June 2009 – May 2010
Junior Lords of the Treasury; Whips	Claire Ward	June 2007 – October 2008
Junior Lords of the Treasury; Whips	Bob Blizzard	October 2008 – May 2010
Junior Lords of the Treasury; Whips	Alan Campbell	June 2007 – October 2008
Junior Lords of the Treasury; Whips	Tony Cunningham	October 2008 – May 2010
Junior Lords of the Treasury; Whips	Stephen McCabe	June 2007 – May 2010
Junior Lords of the Treasury; Whips	Frank Roy	June 2007 – May 2010
Junior Lords of the Treasury; Whips	Dave Watts	June 2007 – May 2010
Assistant Whips	Siobhan McDonagh	June 2007 – September 2008
Assistant Whips	Michael Foster	June 2007 – October 2008
Assistant Whips	Tony Cunningham	June 2007 – October 2008
Assistant Whips	Alison Seabeck	June 2007 – October 2008
Assistant Whips	Diana Johnson (Unpaid) (also Children, Schools & Families)	June 2007 – June 2009
Assistant Whips	Sadiq Khan (Unpaid)	June 2007 – October 2008
Assistant Whips	Bob Blizzard	June 2007 – October 2008
Assistant Whips	Wayne David	June 2007 – October 2008
Assistant Whips	Tom Watson	June 2007 – January 2008
Assistant Whips	Helen Jones	October 2008 – June 2009
Assistant Whips	Helen Goodman	October 2008 – June 2009
Assistant Whips	Ian Austin (also Minister for the West Midlands)	October 2008 – June 2009
Assistant Whips	Barbara Keeley	October 2008 – June 2009
Assistant Whips	Chris Mole	October 2008 – June 2009
Assistant Whips	Ian Lucas	October 2008 – June 2009
Assistant Whips	Lyn Brown	June 2009 – May 2010
Assistant Whips	Dawn Butler	September 2008 – May 2010
Assistant Whips	Mary Creagh (Unpaid)	June 2009 – May 2010
Assistant Whips	John Heppell	June 2009 – May 2010
Assistant Whips	Sharon Hodgson (Unpaid)	June 2009 – May 2010
Assistant Whips	Kerry McCarthy	June 2009 – May 2010
Assistant Whips	George Mudie	June 2009 – May 2010
Assistant Whips	Mark Tami (Unpaid)	June 2007 – May 2010
Assistant Whips	David Wright (Unpaid)	June 2009 – May 2010
Captain of the Honourable Corps of Gentlemen-at-Arms; Chief Whip	Bruce Grocott, Baron Grocott	June 2007 – January 2008
Captain of the Honourable Corps of Gentlemen-at-Arms; Chief Whip	Janet Royall, Baroness Royall of Blaisdon	January–October 2008
Captain of the Honourable Corps of Gentlemen-at-Arms; Chief Whip	Steve Bassam, Baron Bassam of Brighton	October 2008 – May 2010
Captain of the Yeomen of the Guard; Deputy Chief Whip (also at Environment from June 2009)	Bryan Davies, Baron Davies of Oldham	June 2007 – May 2010
Lords and Baronesses-in-Waiting; Whips	Bill Brett, Baron Brett	October 2008 – May 2010
Lords and Baronesses-in-Waiting; Whips	Janet Royall, Baroness Royall of Blaisdon	June 2007 – January 2008
Lords and Baronesses-in-Waiting; Whips	Delyth Morgan, Baroness Morgan of Drefelin	June 2007 – October 2008
Lords and Baronesses-in-Waiting; Whips	Steve Bassam, Baron Bassam of Brighton	June 2007 – October 2008
Lords and Baronesses-in-Waiting; Whips	Peter Truscott, Baron Truscott	June–October 2007
Lords and Baronesses-in-Waiting; Whips	Christine Crawley, Baroness Crawley	June 2007 – October 2008, June 2009 – May 2010
Lords and Baronesses-in-Waiting; Whips	Josie Farrington, Baroness Farrington of Ribbleton (Unpaid)	June 2007 – May 2010
Lords and Baronesses-in-Waiting; Whips	Willy Bach, Baron Bach	November 2007 – June 2009
Lords and Baronesses-in-Waiting; Whips	Richard Faulkner, Baron Faulkner of Worcester (Unpaid)	June 2009 – May 2010
Lords and Baronesses-in-Waiting; Whips	Anthony Young, Baron Young of Norwood Green (also Business from June 2009, Unpaid)	October 2008 – May 2010
Lords and Baronesses-in-Waiting; Whips	Glenys Thornton, Baroness Thornton	February 2008 – February 2010
Lords and Baronesses-in-Waiting; Whips	Denis Tunnicliffe, Baron Tunnicliffe	October 2008 – May 2010

== See also ==
- Government of the United Kingdom
- Cabinet of the United Kingdom
- Blair ministry

== Notes ==
Preceded by Third Blair ministry	Government of the United Kingdom; 2007–2010	Succeeded by Cameron–Clegg coalition
