= 2006 British cabinet reshuffle =

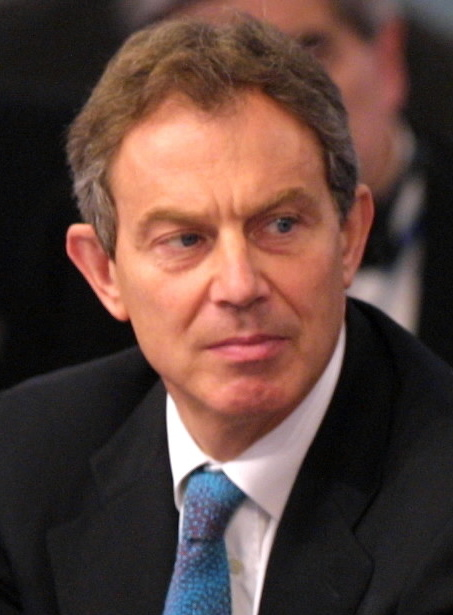
Tony Blair

Following poor results for the Labour Party in the local elections in England on 4 May 2006, British Prime Minister Tony Blair held a cabinet reshuffle the following day.

== Changes ==
=== Secretary of State for the Home Department ===
John Reid moved from Defence to become the new Home Secretary, following Blair's decision to remove Charles Clarke from the position. Clarke refused the offer of other Cabinet positions and returned to the back benches. This was Reid's ninth cabinet position in nine years.

=== Secretary of State for Foreign and Commonwealth Affairs ===
Margaret Beckett, previously Secretary of State for Environment, Food and Rural Affairs, was promoted to become Britain's first ever female Foreign Secretary, replacing Jack Straw. Straw had held the prominent position from 2001 and was heavily involved in the war on terror. Straw's departure from his role as Foreign Secretary had not been widely predicted, but the move apparently came at his own request for a change following nearly a decade of service in front-line positions in the Cabinet, first as Home Secretary and then as Foreign Secretary although others have argued that Straw was sacked for his growing allegiance with Gordon Brown and dismissal of military action against Iran. Straw became Leader of the House of Commons and Lord Privy Seal, and also took over responsibility for reform of the House of Lords and political party funding.

=== Deputy Prime Minister and First Secretary of State ===
John Prescott remained as Deputy Prime Minister and First Secretary of State, but was stripped of all the departmental ministerial responsibilities formerly associated with the office, apparently at his own request, following the revelation that he had an affair with his secretary. These responsibilities were taken over by Ruth Kelly under the new title of Secretary of State for Communities and Local Government.

=== Leader of the House of Commons, Lords Reform and Party Funding ===
Jack Straw, formerly Foreign Secretary, took over the Leadership of the House of Commons and the sinecure office of Lord Privy Seal from Geoff Hoon (who became Minister of State for Europe). Responsibility for Reform of the House of Lords and political party funding was transferred from the Secretary of State for Constitutional Affairs.

=== Secretary of State for Trade and Industry ===
Alistair Darling, formerly both the Secretary of State for Transport and the Secretary of State for Scotland, replaced Alan Johnson as the Secretary of State for Trade and Industry. Johnson was moved to become Secretary of State for Education and Skills.

=== Cabinet Office and Social Exclusion Minister and Chancellor of the Duchy of Lancaster ===
Hilary Armstrong moved from her former function as Chief Whip and Parliamentary Secretary to the Treasury to become Minister for the Cabinet Office and Minister for Social Exclusion. She also filled the traditional sinecure office of Chancellor of the Duchy of Lancaster which had been vacant since John Hutton was promoted to replace David Blunkett as Secretary of State for Work and Pensions in November 2005.

=== Secretary of State for Education and Skills ===
Alan Johnson, formerly Secretary of State for Trade and Industry, became the new Secretary of State for Education and Skills. He replaced Ruth Kelly, who moved to the new office of Secretary of State for Communities and Local Government.

=== Secretary of State for Communities and Local Government ===
Ruth Kelly, formerly Secretary of State for Education and Skills, became the new Secretary of State for Communities and Local Government. This department took over some functions from the Home Office and the Department of Trade and Industry, especially connected with equality legislation, but the bulk of the department was made up of the former Office of the Deputy Prime Minister, which was run by John Prescott before he lost his departmental responsibilities in the reshuffle, and also takes over the responsibilities of David Miliband, former Minister of State for Communities and Local Government.

=== Secretary of State for Environment, Food and Rural Affairs ===
David Miliband moved from his position in the Cabinet as Minister of State for Communities and Local Government to become the new Secretary of State for Environment, Food and Rural Affairs. He replaced Margaret Beckett, who was promoted to become Foreign Secretary.

=== Secretary of State for Defence ===
Des Browne replaced John Reid as Secretary of State for Defence. He was previously Chief Secretary to the Treasury, another Cabinet position. Reid was promoted to become Home Secretary.

=== Secretary of State for Transport and Secretary of State for Scotland ===
The roles of Secretary of State for Transport and Secretary of State for Scotland were filled by Douglas Alexander. Both of these positions were formerly held by Alistair Darling, who became Secretary of State for Trade and Industry.

=== Minister without Portfolio and Party Chairman ===
Hazel Blears replaced Ian McCartney as Minister without Portfolio and Chairman of the Labour Party. McCartney was demoted to become Minister of State for Trade, attending the Cabinet, but not actively voting in it.

=== Chief Whip and Parliamentary Secretary to the Treasury ===
The positions of Chief Whip and Parliamentary Secretary to the Treasury were given to Jacqui Smith, replacing Hilary Armstrong. Smith was previously Minister of State for Schools in the Department for Education and Skills. Armstrong became Minister of State for the Cabinet Office and for "Social Exclusion", and Chancellor of the Duchy of Lancaster

=== Chief Secretary to the Treasury ===
Stephen Timms was promoted to Cabinet rank to become the new Chief Secretary to the Treasury, replacing Des Browne. Timms had served in the Treasury twice before, in the more junior office of Financial Secretary to the Treasury, and was Minister for Pensions before the reshuffle. This was Timms' first Cabinet appointment.

=== Minister for Europe, attending Cabinet ===
Geoff Hoon, formerly Leader of the House of Commons and Lord Privy Seal, became the new Minister for Europe at the Foreign Office. Initial reports billed him as "Secretary of State for Europe", which may have been his understanding at the time he left Downing Street. Although he continued to attend the Cabinet, he had lost his Cabinet vote, and his new position was a substantial demotion.

== Cabinet from 5 May 2006 ==
Position(s)	Minister	
Prime Minister, First Lord of the Treasury and Minister for the Civil Service	Rt Hon Tony Blair MP	unchanged
Deputy Prime Minister and First Secretary of State	Rt Hon John Prescott MP	unchanged
Chancellor of the Exchequer	Rt Hon Gordon Brown MP	unchanged
Leader of the House of Commons and Lord Privy Seal	Rt Hon Jack Straw MP	
Foreign Secretary	Rt Hon Margaret Beckett MP	
Secretary of State for Trade and Industry	Rt Hon Alistair Darling MP	
Home Secretary	Rt Hon John Reid MP	
Secretary of State for Health	Rt Hon Patricia Hewitt MP	unchanged
Secretary of State for Culture, Media and Sport	Rt Hon Tessa Jowell MP	unchanged
Minister for the Cabinet Office and for Social Exclusion and Chancellor of the Duchy of Lancaster	Rt Hon Hilary Armstrong MP	
Secretary of State for Northern Ireland and Secretary of State for Wales	Rt Hon Peter Hain MP	unchanged
Leader of the House of Lords and Lord President of the Council	Rt Hon Baroness Amos	unchanged
Secretary of State for Constitutional Affairs and Lord Chancellor	Rt Hon Lord Falconer of Thoroton QC	unchanged
Secretary of State for International Development	Rt Hon Hilary Benn MP	unchanged
Secretary of State for Education and Skills	Rt Hon Alan Johnson MP	
Secretary of State for Communities and Local Government and Minister for Women	Rt Hon Ruth Kelly MP	
Secretary of State for Work and Pensions	Rt Hon John Hutton MP	unchanged
Secretary of State for Environment, Food and Rural Affairs	Rt Hon David Miliband MP	
Secretary of State for Defence	Rt Hon Des Browne MP	
Secretary of State for Transport and Secretary of State for Scotland	Rt Hon Douglas Alexander MP	
Minister without Portfolio	Rt Hon Hazel Blears MP	
Chief Whip (Parliamentary Secretary to the Treasury)	Rt Hon Jacqui Smith MP	
Chief Secretary to the Treasury	Stephen Timms MP	to be sworn of the Privy Council
Also attending cabinet (but not voting)
Lords Chief Whip and Captain of the Gentlemen at Arms	The Rt Hon Lord Grocott	unchanged
Attorney general	Rt Hon Lord Goldsmith QC	unchanged
Minister of State for Europe (in the FCO)	Rt Hon Geoff Hoon MP	
Minister of State for Trade (in the FCO and the DTI)	Rt Hon Ian McCartney MP	
