= Blair ministry =

Blair ministry may refer to:

- First Blair ministry, the British majority government led by Tony Blair from 1997 to 2001
- Second Blair ministry, the British majority government led by Tony Blair from 2001 to 2005
- Third Blair ministry, the British majority government led by Tony Blair from 2005 to 2007

== See also ==
- Premiership of Tony Blair
- Shadow Cabinet of Tony Blair
