= Chief Secretary to the Treasury =

Senior minister in His Majesty's Treasury

United Kingdom Chief Secretary to the Treasury
- Royal Arms of His Majesty's Government

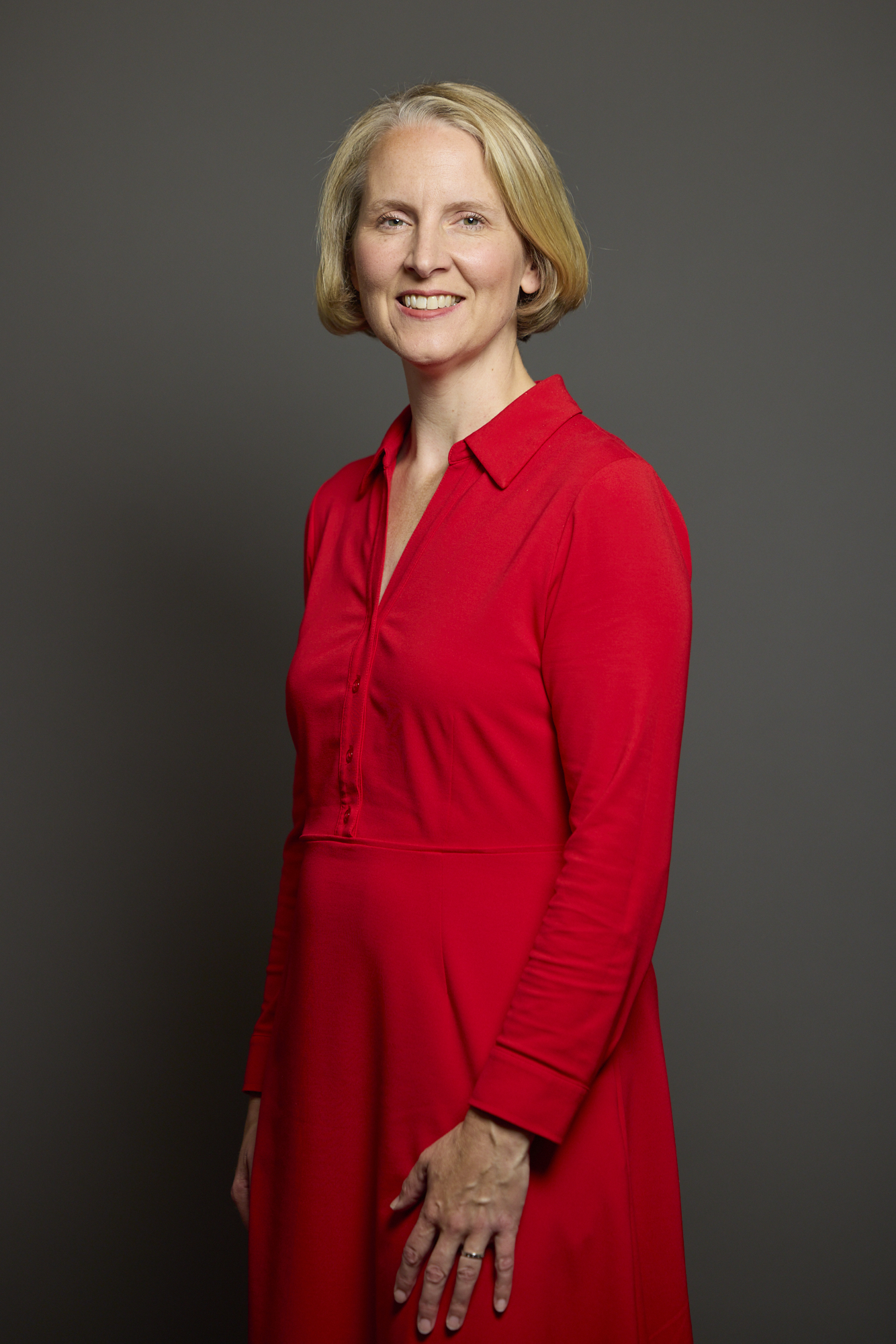
- Incumbent; Emma Reynolds since 20 July 2026
- His Majesty's Treasury
- Style: The Right Honourable
- Reports to: Chancellor of the Exchequer; Prime Minister
- Nominator: Prime Minister
- Appointer: The Monarch (on the advice of the prime minister)
- Term length: At His Majesty's pleasure
- Formation: 8 October 1961
- First holder: Henry Brooke
- Salary: £121,326 per annum (2022) (including £86,584 MP salary)
- Website: Official Website

The chief secretary to the treasury is a senior ministerial office in the government of the United Kingdom and is the second most senior ministerial office in HM Treasury, after the chancellor of the Exchequer. The office holder is usually a full member or attendee of the Cabinet of the United Kingdom.

The office was created in 1961 to share the burden of representing HM Treasury with the chancellor.

The minister is shadowed by the shadow chief secretary to the Treasury who sits on the Official Opposition frontbench.

== History and responsibilities ==
Between 1961 and 2015, the holder of the office of Chief Secretary to the Treasury was of full cabinet rank. This formally made HM Treasury the only department to have more than one ministerial position of cabinet rank.

The office holder is responsible for public expenditure, including spending reviews and value for money.

== List of chief secretaries to the treasury ==
Chief Secretary to the Treasury
Conservative Labour Liberal Democrat
Chief secretary			Term of office		Party	Ministry	Chancellor
		Henry Brooke; MP for Hampstead	9 October 1961	13 July 1962	Conservative	Macmillan (I & II)	Selwyn Lloyd
‍		John Boyd-Carpenter; MP for Kingston-upon-Thames	13 July 1962	16 October 1964	Conservative	Macmillan (I & II)	Reginald Maudling
		John Boyd-Carpenter; MP for Kingston-upon-Thames	13 July 1962	16 October 1964	Conservative	Douglas-Home	Reginald Maudling
		Jack Diamond; MP for Gloucester	20 October 1964	19 June 1970	Labour	Wilson (I & II)	James Callaghan
		Jack Diamond; MP for Gloucester	20 October 1964	19 June 1970	Labour	Wilson (I & II)	Roy Jenkins
		Maurice Macmillan; MP for Farnham	23 June 1970	7 April 1972	Conservative	Heath	Iain Macleod
		Maurice Macmillan; MP for Farnham	23 June 1970	7 April 1972	Conservative	Heath	Anthony Barber
		Patrick Jenkin; MP for Wanstead and Woodford	7 April 1972	8 January 1974	Conservative	Heath	Anthony Barber
		Tom Boardman; MP for Leicester South West	8 January 1974	4 March 1974	Conservative	Heath	Anthony Barber
		Joel Barnett; MP for Heywood and Royton	7 March 1974	4 May 1979	Labour	Wilson (III & IV)	Denis Healey
		Joel Barnett; MP for Heywood and Royton	7 March 1974	4 May 1979	Labour	Callaghan	Denis Healey
		John Biffen; MP for Oswestry	5 May 1979	5 January 1981	Conservative	Thatcher I	Geoffrey Howe
		Leon Brittan; MP for Cleveland and Whitby	5 January 1981	11 June 1983	Conservative	Thatcher I	Geoffrey Howe
		Peter Rees; MP for Dover	11 June 1983	2 September 1985	Conservative	Thatcher II	Nigel Lawson
		John MacGregor; MP for South Norfolk	2 September 1985	13 June 1987	Conservative	Thatcher II	Nigel Lawson
		John Major; MP for Huntingdon	13 June 1987	24 July 1989	Conservative	Thatcher III	Nigel Lawson
		Norman Lamont; MP for Kingston-upon-Thames	24 July 1989	28 November 1990	Conservative	Thatcher III	John Major
		David Mellor; MP for Putney	28 November 1990	10 April 1992	Conservative	Major I	Norman Lamont
		Michael Portillo; MP for Enfield Southgate	10 April 1992	20 July 1994	Conservative	Major II	Norman Lamont
		Michael Portillo; MP for Enfield Southgate	10 April 1992	20 July 1994	Conservative	Major II	Kenneth Clarke
		Jonathan Aitken; MP for South Thanet	20 July 1994	5 July 1995	Conservative	Major II	Kenneth Clarke
		William Waldegrave; MP for Bristol West	5 July 1995	2 May 1997	Conservative	Major II	Kenneth Clarke
		Alistair Darling; MP for Edinburgh Central	3 May 1997	27 July 1998	Labour	Blair I	Gordon Brown
	Stephen Byers official portrait	Stephen Byers; MP for North Tyneside	27 July 1998	23 December 1998	Labour	Blair I	Gordon Brown
		Alan Milburn; MP for Darlington	23 December 1998	11 October 1999	Labour	Blair I	Gordon Brown
		Andrew Smith; MP for Oxford East	11 October 1999	29 May 2002	Labour	Blair I	Gordon Brown
		Andrew Smith; MP for Oxford East	11 October 1999	29 May 2002	Labour	Blair II	Gordon Brown
		Paul Boateng; MP for Brent South	29 May 2002	6 May 2005	Labour	Blair II	Gordon Brown
		Des Browne; MP for Kilmarnock and Loudoun	6 May 2005	5 May 2006	Labour	Blair III	Gordon Brown
		Stephen Timms; MP for East Ham	5 May 2006	28 June 2007	Labour	Blair III	Gordon Brown
		Andy Burnham; MP for Leigh	28 June 2007	24 January 2008	Labour	Brown	Alistair Darling
		Yvette Cooper; MP for Pontefract and Castleford	24 January 2008	5 June 2009	Labour	Brown	Alistair Darling
		Liam Byrne; MP for Birmingham Hodge Hill	5 June 2009	11 May 2010	Labour	Brown	Alistair Darling
		David Laws; MP for Yeovil	12 May 2010	29 May 2010	Liberal Democrat	Cameron–Clegg (Con.–L.D.)	George Osborne
		Danny Alexander; MP for Inverness, Nairn, Badenoch and Strathspey	29 May 2010	8 May 2015	Liberal Democrat	Cameron–Clegg (Con.–L.D.)	George Osborne
		Greg Hands; MP for Chelsea and Fulham	11 May 2015	14 July 2016	Conservative	Cameron II	George Osborne
		David Gauke; MP for South West Hertfordshire	14 July 2016	11 June 2017	Conservative	May I	Philip Hammond
		Liz Truss; MP for South West Norfolk	11 June 2017	24 July 2019	Conservative	May II	Philip Hammond
		Rishi Sunak; MP for Richmond (Yorks)	24 July 2019	13 February 2020	Conservative	Johnson I	Sajid Javid
		Rishi Sunak; MP for Richmond (Yorks)	24 July 2019	13 February 2020	Conservative	Johnson II	Sajid Javid
		Steve Barclay; MP for North East Cambridgeshire	13 February 2020	15 September 2021	Conservative	Johnson II	Rishi Sunak
		Simon Clarke; MP for Middlesbrough South and East Cleveland	15 September 2021	6 September 2022	Conservative	Johnson II	Rishi Sunak
		Simon Clarke; MP for Middlesbrough South and East Cleveland	15 September 2021	6 September 2022	Conservative	Johnson II	Nadhim Zahawi
		Chris Philp; MP for Croydon South	6 September 2022	14 October 2022	Conservative	Truss	Kwasi Kwarteng
		Edward Argar; MP for Charnwood	14 October 2022	25 October 2022	Conservative	Truss	Jeremy Hunt
		John Glen; MP for Salisbury	25 October 2022	13 November 2023	Conservative	Sunak	Jeremy Hunt
		Laura Trott; MP for Sevenoaks	13 November 2023	5 July 2024	Conservative	Sunak	Jeremy Hunt
		Darren Jones; MP for Bristol North West	5 July 2024	1 September 2025	Labour	Starmer	Rachel Reeves
		James Murray; MP for Ealing North	1 September 2025	14 May 2026	Labour	Starmer	Rachel Reeves
		Lucy Rigby; MP for Northampton North	14 May 2026	20 July 2026	Labour	Starmer	Rachel Reeves
		Emma Reynolds; MP for Wycombe	20 July 2026	Incumbent	Labour	Burnham	John Healey

== See also ==
- Secretary to the Treasury
- Financial Secretary to the Treasury
- Economic Secretary to the Treasury
- Exchequer Secretary to the Treasury
- Paymaster General
