= Secretary of State for Housing, Communities and Local Government =

Member of the Cabinet of the United Kingdom

United Kingdom Secretary of State for Housing, Communities and Local Government
- Royal Arms of His Majesty's Government

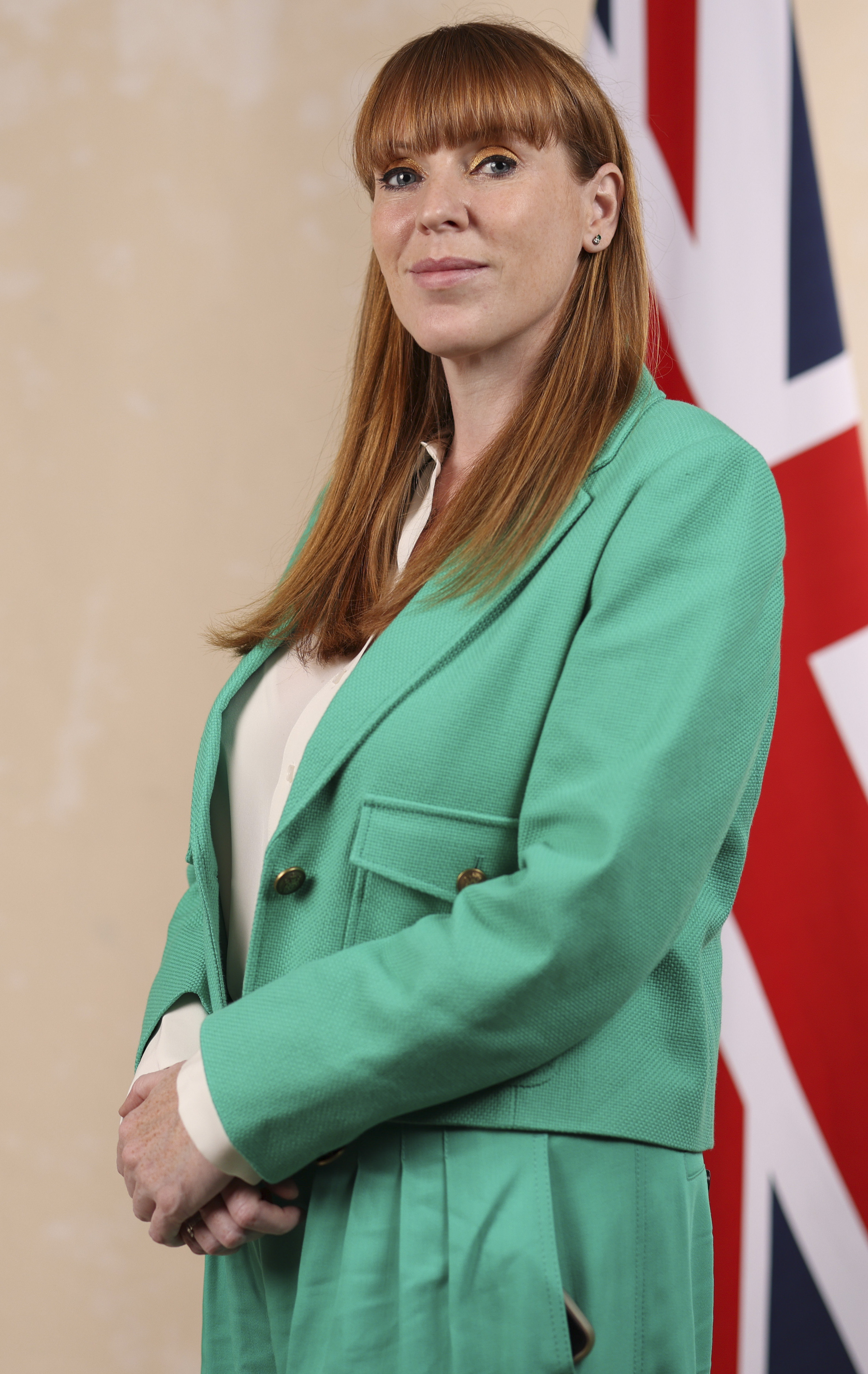
- Incumbent; Angela Rayner since 20 July 2026
- Ministry of Housing, Communities and Local Government
- Style: The Right Honourable (within the UK and Commonwealth)
- Type: Minister of the Crown
- Status: Secretary of State
- Member of: Cabinet; Privy Council
- Reports to: The Prime Minister
- Seat: Westminster
- Nominator: The Prime Minister
- Appointer: The Monarch (on the advice of the Prime Minister)
- Term length: At His Majesty's Pleasure
- Formation: 5 May 2002: (as Secretary of State for Local Government and the Regions); 18 September 2021: (as Secretary of State for Levelling Up, Housing and Communities); 8 July 2024: (as Secretary of State for Housing, Communities and Local Government)
- First holder: John Prescott (as Secretary of State for Local Government and the Regions)
- Deputy: Minister of State for Housing and Planning
- Salary: £159,038 per annum (2022) (including £86,584 MP salary)
- Website: www.gov.uk/government/organisations/ministry-of-housing-communities-local-government

The secretary of state for housing, communities and local government is a senior minister in the Government of the United Kingdom and the head of the Ministry of Housing, Communities and Local Government (MHCLG). As a Cabinet-level position, the office holder is responsible for housing, planning, and local government policy in England.

The corresponding shadow minister is the shadow secretary of state for housing, communities and local government.

== History ==
The Department for Communities and Local Government was created in 2006 by then British prime minister Tony Blair to replace John Prescott's Office of the Deputy Prime Minister, which had taken on the local government and regions portfolios from the defunct Department for Transport, Local Government and the Regions in 2002.

The secretary of state took over the responsibilities of the minister of state for communities and local government. This post, within the Office of the Deputy Prime Minister, was created in 2005, on the transfer of several functions from the deputy prime minister himself.

In 2018 the position was incorporated as a corporation sole.

Then prime minister Boris Johnson renamed the position Secretary of State for Levelling Up, Housing and Communities and gave the secretary and the department responsibility for carrying out the promise in the 2019 Conservative Party manifesto of "levelling up". Labour prime minister Keir Starmer renamed the department as the Ministry of Housing, Communities and Local Government on 8 July 2024, retiring the levelling up moniker.

== Responsibilities ==
According to the UK government, the secretary of state has overall strategic oversight of the department’s business and policy in areas in England including:

- housing and planning
- services for people experiencing homelessness
- local government
- communities and faith
- democracy and elections
- public appointments
- planning casework
- corporate functions

== List of secretaries of state ==
=== Secretary of State for Local Government and the Regions ===
Minister	Term of office		Party	Ministry
John Prescott; MP for Kingston upon Hull East	29 May 2002	5 May 2006	Labour	Blair II; Blair III
=== Secretary of State for Communities and Local Government ===
Secretary of State	Term of office		Party	Ministry
Ruth Kelly; MP for Bolton West	6 May 2006	28 June 2007	Labour	Blair III
Hazel Blears; MP for Salford	28 June 2007	5 June 2009	Labour	Brown
John Denham; MP for Southampton Itchen	5 June 2009	11 May 2010	Labour	Brown
Eric Pickles; MP for Brentwood and Ongar	12 May 2010	11 May 2015	Conservative	Cameron–Clegg (Con.–L.D.)
Greg Clark; MP for Tunbridge Wells	11 May 2015	14 July 2016	Conservative	Cameron II
Sajid Javid; MP for Bromsgrove	14 July 2016	8 January 2018	Conservative	May I
Sajid Javid; MP for Bromsgrove	14 July 2016	8 January 2018	Conservative	May II
=== Secretary of State for Housing, Communities and Local Government ===
Secretary of State	Term of office		Party	Ministry
Sajid Javid; MP for Bromsgrove	8 January 2018	30 April 2018	Conservative	May II
James Brokenshire; MP for Old Bexley and Sidcup	30 April 2018	24 July 2019	Conservative	May II
Robert Jenrick; MP for Newark	24 July 2019	15 September 2021	Conservative	Johnson I
Robert Jenrick; MP for Newark	24 July 2019	15 September 2021	Conservative	Johnson II
=== Secretary of State for Levelling Up, Housing and Communities ===
Secretary of State	Term of office		Party	Ministry
Michael Gove; MP for Surrey Heath	15 September (Note: Still known officially as Secretary of State for Housing, Communities and Local Government until 19 September 2021); 2021	6 July 2022	Conservative	Johnson II
Greg Clark; MP for Tunbridge Wells	7 July 2022	6 September 2022	Conservative	Johnson II
Simon Clarke; MP for Middlesbrough South and East Cleveland	6 September 2022	25 October 2022	Conservative	Truss
Michael Gove; MP for Surrey Heath	25 October 2022	5 July 2024	Conservative	Sunak
=== Secretary of State for Housing, Communities and Local Government ===
Secretary of State	Term of office		Party	Ministry
Angela Rayner; MP for Ashton under Lyne	5 July (Note: Known as Secretary of State for Levelling Up, Housing and Communities until official change on 9 July 2024); 2024	5 September 2025	Labour	Starmer
Steve Reed; MP for Streatham and Croydon North	5 September 2025	20 July 2026	Labour	Starmer
Angela Rayner; MP for Ashton under Lyne	20 July 2026	Incumbent	Labour	Burnham
