= Minister for Social Exclusion =

The Minister for Social Exclusion was a ministerial position within the cabinet of the British government. It was first created as a position outside the cabinet by Tony Blair in 1999 and charged with "tackling social exclusion". From May 2006 until June 2007 it was a full cabinet position in order to put such issues at the forefront of the government's agenda. However, since the Premiership of Gordon Brown, it is no longer a position in Government and as such has become redundant.

The last minister was Hilary Armstrong.

== List of ministers ==
Name	Took office	Left office	Length of term	Political party	Ministry
Barbara Roche	30 May 2002	13 June 2003	1 year and 14 days	Labour	Blair II
Phil Woolas	10 May 2005	5 May 2006	11 months and 25 days	Labour	Blair III
Hilary Armstrong	5 May 2006	28 June 2007	1 year, 1 month and 23 days	Labour	Blair III
