= Minister of State for Communities and Local Government =

British Cabinet position

The position of Minister of State for Communities and Local Government was a cabinet-level position in the United Kingdom Government. It was created by Tony Blair in 2005 following his victory in the general election of that year. The minister held many responsibilities which were formally held by the Deputy Prime Minister, to whom he reported.

David Miliband became the first holder of the post. His selection was not without controversy, as some speculated that Tony Blair had wanted to give David Blunkett the position as a Secretary of State, but this was opposed by Deputy Prime Minister John Prescott.

On 5 May 2006, the post was changed when it was announced that the Office of the Deputy Prime Minister would be losing its responsibility for local government and housing, and Ruth Kelly would be appointed Secretary of State for Communities and Local Government.
