= Kay Andrews, Baroness Andrews =

British Labour politician and life peer (born 1943)

The Right Honourable The Baroness Andrews OBE FSA
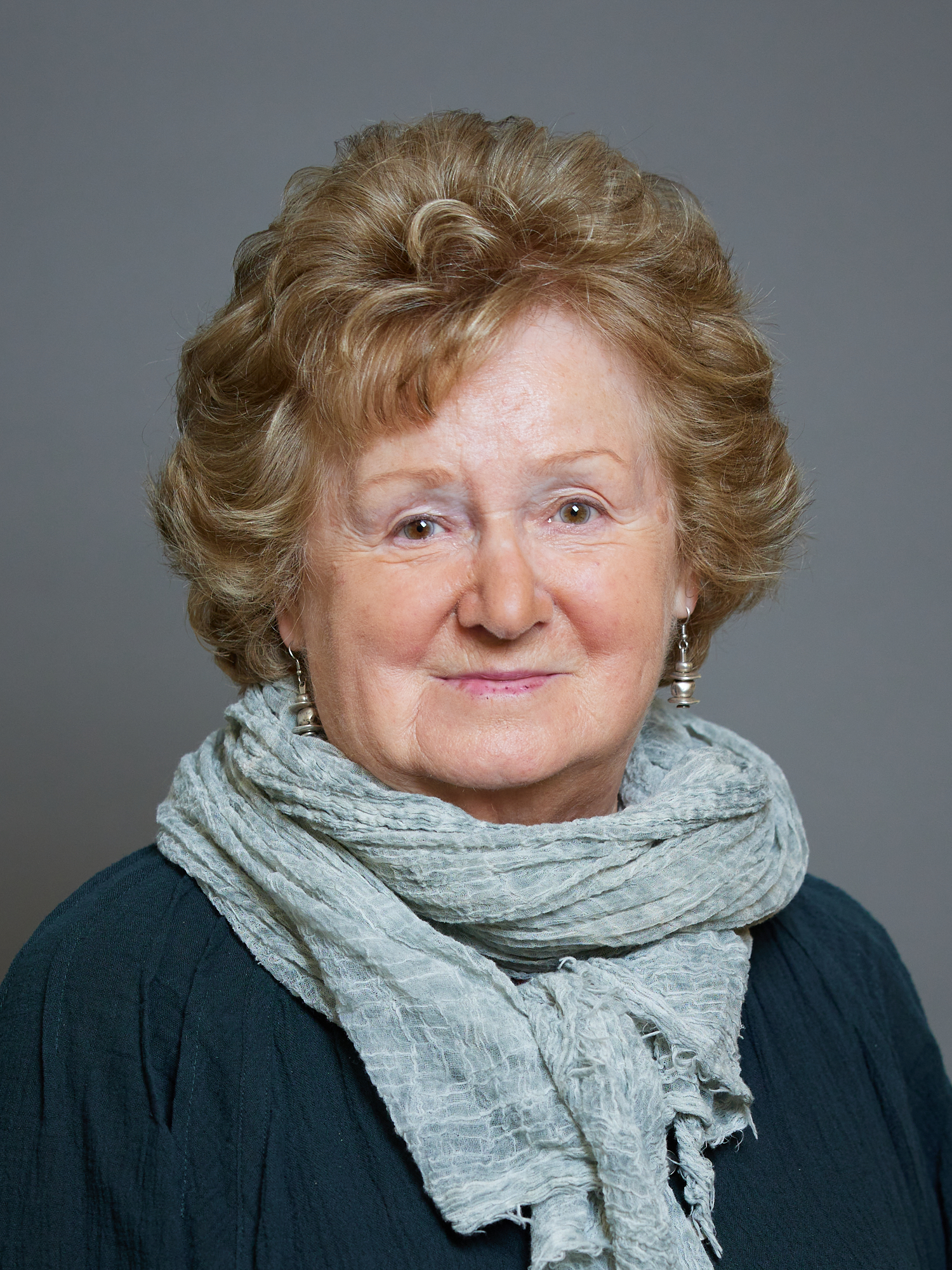

Parliamentary Under-Secretary of State for Communities and Local Government
- In office 5 May 2006 – 5 June 2009
- Monarch: Elizabeth II
- Prime Minister: Tony Blair; Gordon Brown
- Preceded by: herself
- Succeeded by: The Lord McKenzie of Luton

Parliamentary Under-Secretary of State for Regeneration and Regional Development
- In office 11 May 2005 – 5 May 2006
- Monarch: Elizabeth II
- Prime Minister: Tony Blair
- Preceded by: Yvette Cooper
- Succeeded by: herself

Baroness-in-Waiting Government Whip
- In office 1 January 2002 – 11 May 2005
- Monarch: Elizabeth II
- Prime Minister: Tony Blair
- Preceded by: new appointment
- Succeeded by: The Lord McKenzie of Luton

Member of the House of Lords
- Lord Temporal
- Life peerage 9 May 2000

Personal details
- Born: May 16, 1943 (age 83)
- Party: Labour

Elizabeth Kay Andrews, Baroness Andrews (born 16 May 1943) is a British Labour politician and life peer. She was Chair of English Heritage from July 2009 to July 2013.

She worked as a Library Clerk (senior researcher) in the House of Commons Library from 1970 to 1985 and was one of the first people in public service to job share. She then became a policy adviser to Neil Kinnock in his office as Leader of the Opposition 1985–92. She served as Director of Education Extra until 2002.

She was created a life peer as Baroness Andrews, of Southover in the County of East Sussex on 9 May 2000. In the House of Lords, she served as a Government Whip from May 2002 and was a Government Spokesperson for Education and Skills; Health; and Work and Pensions until the election in May 2005. She was then appointed Parliamentary Under Secretary of State at the Department for Communities and Local Government. She stood down from Government in July 2009.

On 27 July 2009, Andrews became the Chair of English Heritage. She was the first woman to head the organisation. She stood down from the position in July 2013.

She is a Vice President of the Campaign for National Parks, President of the Friends of Lewes and a Trustee of the Prince’s Regeneration Trust.

== Honours ==
Andrews was appointed an Officer of the Order of the British Empire (OBE) in the 1998 Birthday Honours On 15 October 2015, she was elected a Fellow of the Society of Antiquaries of London (FSA).
