= Ruth Kelly =

British Labour politician (born 1968)

The Right Honourable Ruth Kelly
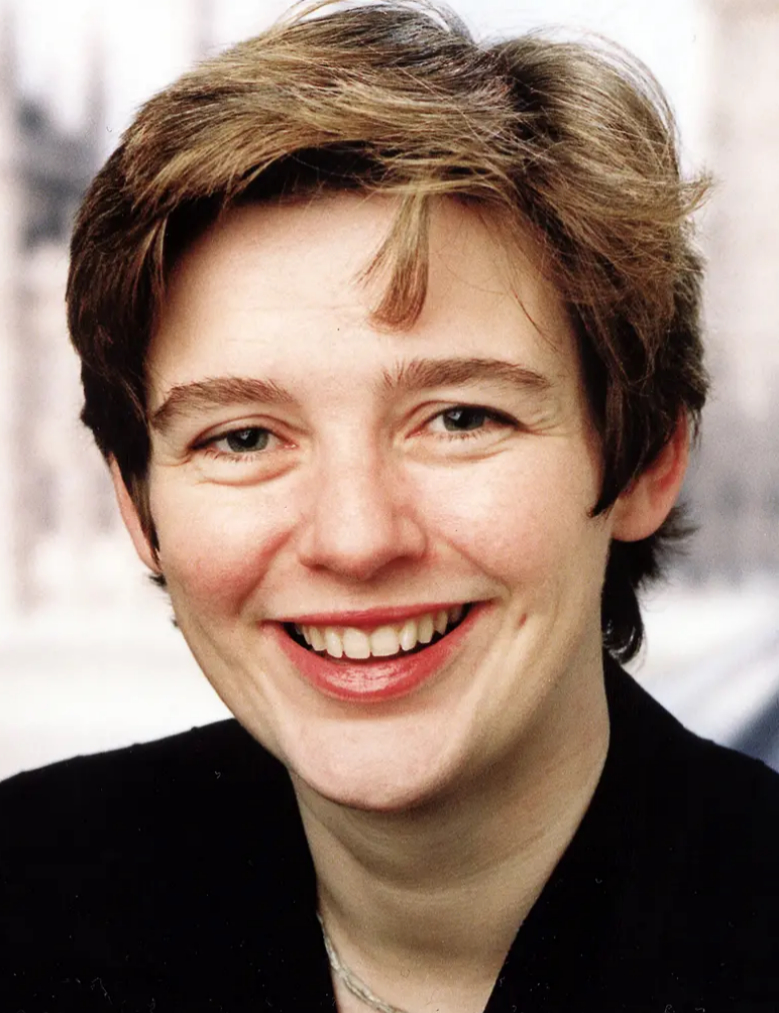
- Official portrait, c. 2004–05

Chair of Water UK
- Incumbent
- Assumed office 14 March 2023
- Preceded by: Anthony Ferrar

Secretary of State for Transport
- In office 28 June 2007 – 3 October 2008
- Prime Minister: Gordon Brown
- Preceded by: Douglas Alexander
- Succeeded by: Geoff Hoon

Secretary of State for Communities and Local Government
- In office 5 May 2006 – 28 June 2007
- Prime Minister: Tony Blair
- Preceded by: David Miliband (Note: As Minister of State.); John Prescott (Note: As First Secretary of State with responsibility for Communities and Local Government)
- Succeeded by: Hazel Blears

Minister for Women
- In office 5 May 2006 – 28 June 2007
- Prime Minister: Tony Blair
- Preceded by: Tessa Jowell
- Succeeded by: Harriet Harman (Note: As Minister for Women and Equality.)

Secretary of State for Education and Skills
- In office 15 December 2004 – 5 May 2006
- Prime Minister: Tony Blair
- Preceded by: Charles Clarke
- Succeeded by: Alan Johnson

Financial Secretary to the Treasury
- In office 15 May 2002 – 15 December 2004
- Prime Minister: Tony Blair
- Preceded by: Paul Boateng
- Succeeded by: Stephen Timms

Economic Secretary to the Treasury
- In office 8 June 2001 – 15 May 2002
- Prime Minister: Tony Blair
- Preceded by: Melanie Johnson
- Succeeded by: John Healey

Member of Parliament for Bolton West
- In office 1 May 1997 – 12 April 2010
- Preceded by: Tom Sackville
- Succeeded by: Julie Hilling

Personal details
- Born: 9 May 1968 (age 58) Limavady, County Londonderry, Northern Ireland, UK
- Party: Labour (1990–2018)
- Spouse: Derek Gadd
- Children: 4
- Education: The Queen's College, Oxford; London School of Economics

Ruth Maria Kelly (born 9 May 1968) is a Northern Irish lobbyist and former politician and government minister currently serving as the chair of Water UK, the trade association representing all of the water and wastewater companies of the United Kingdom.

She was previously a British Labour Party politician who served as the Member of Parliament (MP) for Bolton West from 1997 to 2010. During her time in post, she served in Tony Blair and Gordon Brown's governments as the Secretary of State for Transport, Secretary of State for Communities and Local Government, Minister for Women and Equality and Secretary of State for Education and Skills.

== Early life and family ==
Kelly was born in Limavady, County Londonderry, Northern Ireland. Her mother was a teacher and her father ran a pharmacy. Her maternal grandfather had been the teacher of a village school in Altishane, County Tyrone. She lived briefly in the Republic of Ireland before moving to England, where she was educated at a number of private schools. She initially attended Edgarley Hall, the preparatory school for Millfield School. She was then educated at the independent Sutton High School, run by the Girls' Day School Trust (GDST) After being moved up a year and sitting O-levels at Sutton High School at the age of 15, she decided to move back to Ireland to look after her ill grandmother. Her grandmother died after six weeks, but Kelly stayed for a year, living with her aunt and taking A-level French. She returned to England on winning a scholarship to the sixth-form of Westminster School.

Kelly then enrolled at The Queen's College, Oxford, where she studied Philosophy, Politics and Economics in 1986 (having originally won a place to study medicine), graduating in 1989. She then undertook postgraduate study at the London School of Economics, where she was awarded a MSc degree in economics in 1992.

Kelly taught at University of Navarra, after she joined the Labour Party in 1990, becoming a member of the party's Bethnal Green and Stepney constituency party.

She was an economics writer for The Guardian from 1990, before becoming deputy head of the Inflation Report Division of the Bank of England in 1994.

She married Derek John Gadd, a local government officer, in 1996, and they have four children.

=== Family history ===
Kelly's maternal grandfather, Philip Murphy, served as an officer in the Irish Republican Army (IRA) during the Irish War of Independence (1919–1921). In 1922 he was interned by the Government of Northern Ireland. Murphy's detention file refers to him as 'quartermaster of the West Fermanagh IRA Battalion'. He went on hunger strike to protest at his detention. He was released unconditionally in June 1924, when internment ended. Her paternal grandfather Francis (Frank) Kelly joined the Connaught Rangers and served in France during the First World War. After the war, he returned to County Tyrone and took up a post of School Master in Altishane. His first wife died leaving a young family of six. He remarried Mary Agnes and had another six children. One of them James (Seamus) was Ruth's father.

=== Religion ===
Kelly is a practising Roman Catholic, a member of the Opus Dei, and a regular attender at their meetings and events. Her brother, Ronan Kelly, is also a member of the group. Previously, uncertainty existed over Kelly's membership; she declined to say whether or not she was a member, saying only that she had received 'spiritual support' from the organisation. Kelly is Vice President of the Catholic Union of Great Britain.

== Parliamentary career ==
In the 1997 general election, Kelly gained the seat of Bolton West from the Conservatives as part of the Labour Party landslide. She was elected while heavily pregnant, and gave birth to her first son eleven days later.

Throughout her first term as an MP, she served on the Treasury Select Committee; she was also appointed as Parliamentary Private Secretary to the Agriculture Minister, Nick Brown, from 1998. Kelly was a member of a commission set up by the Institute for Public Policy Research into the Private Finance Initiative, which expressed some scepticism about the operation of the policy.

After Labour won the 2001 general election, Kelly was appointed as Economic Secretary to the Treasury. Her role focused on competition policy and small businesses. After a year she was promoted to be Financial Secretary to the Treasury, giving her responsibility for regulation of the financial services industry. In both positions her principal task was in the thorough revision of the Financial Services regulation system which was introduced by the Financial Services and Markets Act 2000. Kelly brought in new regulations to tackle the funding of terrorism after September 2001 attacks.

Kelly was assigned the task of dealing with Equitable Life after the Penrose Report into the life insurance company was published. She rejected calls for government compensation to Equitable policyholders, on the grounds that the losses arose from actions of the company rather than from any defect of regulation, and that it was still trading. Equitable policyholders continued to demand redress.

As a mother of four young children, she refused to work the long hours normally associated with such positions and refused to take a red box in the evening whilst at the Treasury.

In a minor reshuffle, she was promoted to be Minister for the Cabinet Office on 9 September 2004, replacing Douglas Alexander. Kelly guided the Civil Contingencies Bill through its final stages in Parliament, which faced serious objections from some civil liberties campaigns.

=== Party loyalty ===
Kelly rarely went against the party whip, being a very consistent supporter of any and all government policy and even in the most divisive votes over Labour's term, she followed the party line. She voted for the Iraq War, and subsequently voted against an independent investigation into the run-up to the war. Kelly also voted for the introduction of tuition top-up fees, in a vote that saw a massive rebellion amongst Labour MPs. She also voted for the introduction of identity cards, voted for replacing Trident, and argued against the addition of a sunset clause in part 2 of the Civil Contingencies Act 2004. In a free parliamentary vote on 20 May 2008, Kelly voted for cutting the upper limit for abortions from 24 to 12 weeks, along with two other Catholic cabinet ministers Des Browne and Paul Murphy.

== Cabinet career ==
=== Secretary of State for Education and Skills ===
In the reshuffle following the resignation of David Blunkett on 15 December 2004, Kelly entered the Cabinet (and thus becoming a member of the Privy Council) with the position of Secretary of State for Education and Skills. She became the youngest woman ever to sit in the Cabinet.

The Government's Extended Schools policy, which planned to open some schools from 8am to 6pm and provide child-care services for working parents, was dubbed by some as "Kelly hours" after Kelly, although the National Childcare Strategy with before and after-school care funded in most schools by the New Opportunities Fund pre-dated extended schools (and Kelly's ministerial tenure) by several years. The extended schools initiative was predicated on wider use of and access to schools as community resources, not just for parents and children. Her proposals in the 2005 white paper to reduce the number and influence of parent governors in trust schools were seen as a partial reversal of this earlier stance.

Kelly attracted considerable criticism by rejecting the proposals of the Tomlinson report on education reform for the 14–19 age group, which suggested replacing A-level exams with a four-tier diploma. After the 2005 election, it was rumoured that she was to be demoted back into her old post at the Treasury and although she kept her position at the DfES, she was said to have been "less than thrilled" by the appointment of Tony Blair's adviser Andrew Adonis as a Minister within her department.

==== Sex offenders in schools controversy ====
On 9 January 2006, it came to light that Kelly's department had granted permission for a man who had been cautioned by police for viewing child pornography images and who was on a sex offenders register to be employed at a school, on the basis that he had not been convicted of an offence. He, and an unknown number of others on the sex offenders register, were not on the DfES prohibited list, "List 99". On 13 January, Kim Howells, a Minister of State at the DfES, admitted that it was he who had actually made the decision, in accordance with advice given to him by civil servants that the "person did not represent an ongoing threat to children but that he should be given a grave warning". In response to the critical media coverage surrounding the issue, Downing Street issued a statement confirming their confidence in Kelly and denying rumours that she was to be replaced.

There was further controversy when it transpired that another teacher had been cleared to work at a school, despite the fact that he had been convicted in 1980 for indecent assault on a 15-year-old girl and had been previously removed from three schools. A letter from the Department for Education that suggested the Secretary of State had considered his case and found that although his past actions had been unwise and unacceptable, he had undertaken teaching work to good effect since.

==== Trust schools ====
A controversy in Kelly's time at the DfES was the proposed introduction of trust schools. The Trusts were intended to be non-profit making and to have charitable status, although they could be formed by commercial enterprises. In fact, one of the early DfES-hosted seminars on the establishment of Trusts included representatives from Microsoft and KPMG. However, it was their ability to set their own admission arrangements that generated the most criticism.

A large number of Labour backbenchers, as well as numerous party luminaries like Neil Kinnock and former Education Secretary Estelle Morris, made known their opposition to the proposals and published an alternative white paper. Faced with such a rebellion, the government initially stressed that it would "press on" with the reforms. However, new Tory leader David Cameron unexpectedly announced that these reforms were in line with Tory policies and that he would support the bill if presented in the proposed form. The government were faced with the prospect of pushing through their reforms only with opposition support and in the face of increased resistance from its own supporters.

When the Education and Inspections Bill 2006 was finally published on 28 February 2006, it contained much of what had been trailed, although most notable by its absence was any mention of "trust school". Foundation and Voluntary Aided schools were left to pick up the mantle of trust schools.

==== Religion and political views ====
The effect of her religious viewpoint on her opinions regarding controversial scientific questions has been of concern to some scientists who have speculated that her religious views could have an effect on government policy regarding stem cell research.

==== Children's schooling ====
All four of Kelly's children started at a Roman Catholic primary school in Wapping, east London. However, on 8 January 2007, the Daily Mirror revealed that she had withdrawn her son from the voluntary aided school, and — following professional advice — sent him to a preparatory school that specialised in the education of boys aged 7–13 with dyslexia and developmental coordination disorder.

According to an Ofsted inspection in 2002, "those with special educational needs, make particularly good progress" at English Martyrs Roman Catholic school, and that pupils generally meet "standards that are much better than those gained by pupils in similar schools". The school achieved the best exam results in the borough of Tower Hamlets, and among the best in the UK, with 96% of children reaching the expected standard for English, and 100% for Maths and Science. The area's education authority also ran six special needs schools within reach of Kelly's home and responded to the controversy saying, "We are proud of the quality of education we offer to all children. We have a strong record in helping children with a wide range of learning needs to succeed."

Ian Gibson, Labour MP for Norwich North, called the decision "a slap in the face for the teachers and pupils in the school the child has been taken out of". However, Conservative Party leader David Cameron, whose own disabled son Ivan attended a state special needs school, defended her decision, saying "People should recognise that politicians like everyone else are parents first and will act in the best interests of their children".

Kelly made a complaint to the Press Complaints Commission about the Mirror's reporting of the story, but the complaint was rejected, with the PCC ruling that the story was "a matter of considerable public interest", given that she is "a Cabinet minister – who had previously been Secretary of State for Education and Skills", and "even if government policy included an acceptance of private schooling for those with special needs, the fact that the complainant did not feel that the current state system could meet her child's requirements raised questions about the nature of publicly-funded schooling and its ability to cater for children with special needs – including those whose families would not be able to pay for private schooling."

==== Fathers 4 Justice attacks ====
Twice Kelly has been targeted by members of fathers' rights group Fathers 4 Justice in egg-throwing incidents. The first was in April 2005; protester Simon Wilmot-Coverdale was charged, and in February 2006 Kelly gave evidence at Salford Magistrates Court. As she left the court, she was again attacked, this time by Michael Downe; the egg smashed on the back of her head. Downes was fined and given an ASBO, which he proceeded to rip up outside the court, promising to continue to fight for fathers' rights.

=== Secretary of State for Communities and Local Government ===
After the English local elections in May 2006, Kelly was appointed Secretary of State for Communities and Local Government, a position created as a spin-off of certain functions from the Office of the Deputy Prime Minister. The department also took over the Home Office's responsibilities for active communities and civic renewal. Kelly was succeeded at the Department for Education and Skills by Alan Johnson.

On 16 October 2006, she announced that her new role would involve cutting down on extremists within communities.

==== Planning decisions ====
Kelly demonstrated some opposition to the development of skyscrapers from her first months as Secretary of State for Communities and Local Government. In November 2006, she stopped the Brunswick Quay proposal, which represented over £100 million worth of investment into Liverpool, from going ahead. The final report of the planners who carried out the public inquiry had recommended approval for the project. In December 2006, she called a public inquiry into the 20 Fenchurch Street tower in London's financial district, on the basis that a tall building would be "unsuitable for this site". In May 2007, she blocked a 42-storey, 120-m tower in the New England Quarter development in Brighton, designed by Allies and Morrison and being planned by the Beetham Organization. She approved the building of new homes and businesses in Walker, Newcastle, in a bid to regenerate the area.

=== Minister for Women and Equalities ===
On top of her appointment as Secretary of State for Communities and Local Government, Kelly was also appointed Minister for Women and Equality by Tony Blair.

Her appointment came under scrutiny as Kelly's staunchly Catholic beliefs and social positions clashed with her position and the government's policy, which was pushing for a number of progressive reforms and equality for gay and bisexual people. This criticism was exacerbated upon Kelly's appointment as Minister for Women and Equality, and criticism was aired on BBC Radio 5 Live and the front page of The Independent in 2006 over her stance on homosexuality. Blair's government repealed many laws that were perceived as being anti-gay, but Kelly consistently opted out of voting on her party's measures. Kelly opposed lowering the age of consent for homosexuality, as well as voting against outlawing discrimination against gay couples adopting children. Out of fourteen votes during the Blair government surrounding the political issues of homosexuality, Kelly had only attended two.

LGBT rights activist Peter Tatchell attacked Kelly for her views on homosexuality, claiming: "Tony Blair would never appoint someone to a race equality post who had a lukewarm record of opposing racism". In a letter published in The Times on 11 May 2006, the Catholic Archbishop of Westminster claimed that attacks on Kelly were anti-Catholic. Cardinal Cormac Murphy-O'Connor wrote "Ms Kelly may well be scrutinised for her fitness in office. That is a political judgement. But her Catholicism should not be a criterion in forming that judgement."

The Observer newspaper reported on 15 October 2006 that Kelly had joined the Prime Minister in seeking to exempt churches from new equality laws which would require Christian churches to treat homosexuality with equal validity to heterosexuality, which Kelly felt went against Catholic teaching. Lorely Burt, the Liberal Democrat Equalities spokesperson, who opposed allowing churches to preach against homosexuality in schools, called for Kelly to be removed from the Cabinet. It was reported in January 2007 that Kelly supported an exemption for Catholic adoption agencies from new laws that would allow them to refuse service to gay couples.

=== Secretary of State for Transport ===
At the 2007 Labour Leadership election, Kelly endorsed and nominated Gordon Brown. Following his unopposed victory, she was appointed Secretary of State for Transport in the formation of the Brown ministry on 28 June, though it had been speculated she would be removed from the cabinet. Within a few days of entering her job, she faced immediate challenges as she was responsible for securing the public's safety through transport after some attempted terrorist attacks. She came under fire for admitting along with other Labour Ministers that she had smoked cannabis as a teenager.

==== Support for biofuels ====
Kelly's support for biofuels drew criticism from activists who felt that it impoverishes third world farmers to assuage first world environmental guilt. "If people starve because of biofuels, Ruth Kelly and her peers will have killed them," wrote environmentalist George Monbiot in The Guardian. "Like all such crimes, it is perpetrated by cowards, attacking the weak to avoid confronting the strong."

==== Railways ====
Kelly announced a major increase of railway capacity by providing extra trains across the country by 2010 which drew criticism for her London bias as most of the funding would be spent there. She gave the go-ahead in 2007 for billions of pounds of public money to be spent on the Crossrail project in London, which caused outrage amongst MPs in other cities, especially Manchester, who had been told that no public transport funding would be given without a congestion charge scheme.

==== Heathrow expansion ====
Kelly set out proposals for a third runway and a sixth terminal at Heathrow under new extensive plans. Gordon Brown admitted this was one of the biggest challenges which faced the UK Government over the coming years.

==== Misuse of public funds ====
In November 2007 it emerged that Kelly had misused part of her £10,000 communications allowance for party political material. The funds should have only been used for politically neutral material, and Kelly apologised for breaking the rules.

==== Cabinet resignation ====
In September 2008, Kelly announced her intention to resign from the cabinet to spend more time with her family. This ended her time as Transport Secretary and cabinet minister after four years. She did not stand at the 2010 general election. Damian McBride, a former senior Labour Party strategist, was removed from being Gordon Brown's political spokesman to Number 10, after criticism of the way he handled Kelly's resignation.

== Parliamentary expenses ==
On 18 May 2009, Kelly became involved in the MPs' expenses scandal when the Daily Telegraph revealed she had claimed a total of £31,000 between 2004 and 2008 for rebuilding, refurbishing, and purchasing appliances for her second home. It was subsequently revealed on 21 May 2009 that some of this money was used to repair damage caused by a burst pipe. Kelly was insured for this damage but did not claim on that insurance after being advised by the fees office that a reasonable amount could be claimed under the allowances system.

== Post-Parliamentary career ==
In May 2010, Kelly became the Global Head of Client Strategy at HSBC. In 2015, she left HSBC and was appointed Pro-Vice Chancellor for Research and Enterprise at St Mary's University, Twickenham. She later left St Mary's University and now works for the Vatican on its financial portfolio.

In 2010, Kelly supported David Miliband for the leadership of the Labour Party over his brother, Ed. She left the Labour Party after Jeremy Corbyn was elected leader.

In 2021, Kelly was appointed the inaugural Chair of Thames Freeport. In 2022 she joined the right-leaning think tank Policy Exchange.

In March 2023, it was announced she would be replacing Anthony Ferrar as Chair of Water UK, leading the board of the trade association for the British water industry.

== See also ==
- Cabinet of the United Kingdom
- List of Northern Ireland members of the Privy Council

== Notes ==
Parliament of the United Kingdom
Preceded by Tom Sackville	Member of Parliament for Bolton West; 1997–2010	Succeeded by Julie Hilling
Political offices
Preceded by Melanie Johnson	Economic Secretary to the Treasury; 2001–2002	Succeeded by John Healey
Preceded by Paul Boateng	Financial Secretary to the Treasury; 2002–2004	Succeeded by Stephen Timms
Preceded by Charles Clarke	Secretary of State for Education and Skills; 2004–2006	Succeeded by Alan Johnson
Preceded by David Miliband as Minister of State for Communities and Local Government	Secretary of State for Communities and Local Government; 2006–2007	Succeeded by Hazel Blears
Preceded by Tessa Jowell	Minister for Women; 2006–2007	Succeeded by Harriet Harman as Minister for Women and Equality
Preceded by Douglas Alexander	Secretary of State for Transport; 2007–2008	Succeeded by Geoff Hoon
