= 1994 in the United Kingdom =

Events from the year 1994 in the United Kingdom.

== Incumbents ==
- Monarch – Elizabeth II
- Prime Minister – John Major (Conservative)

== Events ==
=== January ===
- 4 January – Following the expulsion of the British ambassador from Sudan, the Foreign Office orders the Sudanese ambassador to leave Britain.
- 8 January – Jayne Torvill and Christopher Dean win the British ice-dancing championship at the Sheffield Arena.
- 10 January – Two government ministers resign: Lord Caithness following the suicide of his wife, and Tim Yeo following the revelation that he fathered a child with Conservative councillor Julia Stent.
- 14 January – The Duchess of Kent joins the Catholic Church, the first member of the Royal Family to convert to Catholicism for more than 300 years.
- 18 January – The Prince of Wales retires from competitive polo at the age of 45.
- 20 January
  - Despite the continuing economic recovery and falling unemployment, the Conservative government is now 20 points behind Labour (who score at 48%) in the latest MORI poll.
  - Former Manchester United manager Sir Matt Busby dies aged 84.
- 25 January – Jimmy Boyce, the newly elected Labour MP for Rotherham in South Yorkshire, dies suddenly of a heart attack aged 47.
- 31 January – British Aerospace sells its 80% stake in Rover to BMW, leaving Britain without an independent volume carmaker. It is envisaged that the new Rover Group will produce more than one million cars per year worldwide and will be Europe's seventh largest carmaker.

=== February ===
- 1 February
  - John Smith (Labour Party leader) strongly criticises the sale of the Rover Group, saying that it only satisfied British Aerospace's short-term need for cash. In contrast, Prime Minister John Major backs the takeover as giving the Rover Group excellent prospects for export markets and investment.
  - Jo Richardson, the Labour MP for Barking in London, dies in office aged 70.
- 4 February – British Coal confirms the closure of four more pits, a move which will claim some 3,000 jobs.
- 7 February – Stephen Milligan, Conservative MP for Eastleigh in Hampshire, is found dead aged 45 at his home in Chiswick, West London. On 11 February it is announced that forensic tests have revealed that he died of asphyxiation and that his death was probably the result of an auto-erotic sex practice.
- 10 February – Three men are jailed in connection with the IRA bombings of Warrington gasworks 11 months previous. Pairic MacFhloinn is jailed for 35 years, Denis Kinsella for 25 years and John Kinsella for 20 years.
- 12–27 February – Great Britain and Northern Ireland compete at the 1994 Winter Olympics in Lillehammer, Norway, and win 2 bronze medals.
- 21 February – Honda sells its 20% stake of the Rover Group, allowing BMW to take full control. This marks the end of the 13-year venture between the two carmakers, although the Honda-based Rover 400 will still go into production next year, becoming the seventh and final product of the venture.
- 24 February – Police in Gloucester begin excavations at 25 Cromwell Street, the home of 52-year-old builder Fred West, investigating the disappearance of his daughter Heather, who was last seen alive in the summer of 1987 when she was 16 years old.
- 28 February
  - Fred West is charged with the murder of his daughter Heather and of the murder of Shirley Robinson, an 18-year-old woman who was last seen alive in 1978.
  - Ron Leighton, the Labour MP for Newham North East in London, dies in office aged 64.

=== March ===
- 8, 10 and 13 March – The IRA launch three successive mortar attacks on Heathrow Airport.
- 8 March – Police in Gloucester confirm that they have now found the bodies of eight people buried at 25 Cromwell Street.
- 12 March – The first women are ordained as priests in the Church of England, at Bristol Cathedral, the very first being Angela Berners-Wilson.
- 19 March – Europe's first inverted roller coaster, Nemesis, opens at Alton Towers.

=== April ===
- April – Economic growth for the first quarter of this year exceeded 1% – the highest for five years.
- 1 April – Women's Royal Air Force fully merged into Royal Air Force.
- 10 April – Human remains are found at Kempley, Gloucestershire, by police working on the Gloucester mass murder case. The body is believed to be that of Catherine "Rena" Costello, Fred West's first wife, who was last seen alive in 1971.
- 12 April – Bob Cryer, the Labour MP for Bradford South in West Yorkshire, is accidentally killed after his car overturns on the M1 near Watford, Hertfordshire, aged 59.
- 20 April – Unemployment has fallen to just over 2.5 million – the lowest level in two years – as the economy continues to make a good recovery from the recession that ended a year ago.
- 28 April – Rosemary West, 40-year-old wife of suspected serial killer Fred West, is charged with three of the murders her husband stands accused of. Rosemary West was first arrested seven days ago, two months after her husband was first taken into custody.
- 29 April – An opinion poll shows that Conservative support has fallen to 26% – their worst showing in any major opinion poll since coming to power 15 years ago.

=== May ===
- 4 May – Police find human remains buried at a former home of Fred and Rose West in Gloucester. The body is believed to be that of Fred West's daughter Charmaine, who was last seen alive at the age of 8 in the summer of 1971.
- 5 May
  - Local council elections see the Conservatives lose 429 seats and control of 18 councils.
  - The Rotherham by-election is held; Denis MacShane holds the seat for Labour.
- 6 May – The Channel Tunnel, a 51 km (32 mi) long rail tunnel beneath the English Channel at the Strait of Dover, is officially opened by the Queen and French President François Mitterrand.
- 9 May – Release of Scottish group Wet Wet Wet's cover of the song "Love Is All Around" (1967), as featured in Four Weddings and a Funeral. From 29 May it will spend 15 consecutive weeks at number one in the UK Singles Chart, the longest spell ever attained by a British act.
- 12 May – John Smith (Labour Party leader) dies suddenly of a heart attack in London at 55 years old.
- 13 May – The film Four Weddings and a Funeral is released in the UK.
- 17 May – Bryan Gould, the Labour MP who unsuccessfully lost to John Smith in the 1992 leadership election, resigns from the House of Commons, triggering a by-election in his Dagenham constituency.
- 19 May – Robert Black, who was jailed for life four years ago for abducting a seven-year-old girl in the Scottish Borders, is found guilty of murdering three girls (Caroline Hogg, Susan Maxwell and Sarah Harper) who were killed during the 1980s and sentenced to life imprisonment with a recommended minimum term of 35 years.
- 25 May – The Camelot Group consortium wins the contract to run the UK's first National Lottery.
- 31 May – Tony Blair and Gordon Brown have dinner at the Granita restaurant in Islington and allegedly make a deal on who will become the leader of the Labour Party, and ultimately, the next Prime Minister of the United Kingdom.

=== June ===
- 2 June – Chinook crash on Mull of Kintyre: an RAF Chinook helicopter carrying more than twenty leading intelligence experts crashes on the Mull of Kintyre, killing everyone on board.
- 7 June
  - Television playwright Dennis Potter, 59, dies of cancer in Ross-on-Wye, a week after his wife Margaret died of the same illness.
  - Police working on the Gloucester mass murder case find and begin the 2-day recovery of human remains from a field at Much Marcle, near Gloucester (a site located by Fred West), which are identified on 30 June to be those of Anne McFall, who was last seen alive in 1967 at the age of 18 and pregnant with West's child.
- 9 June
  - David Chidgey wins the Eastleigh seat for the Liberal Democrats in the by-election sparked by Stephen Milligan's death; the Tory majority now stands at 15 seats compared with the 21-seat majority they gained at the general election two years ago.
  - By-elections are held in the seats of Barking, Bradford South, Dagenham and Newham North East; all four are held by Labour.
- 13 June – The Conservatives suffer their worst election results this century, winning a mere 18 out of 87 of the nation's seats in the European parliament elections. The resurgent Labour Party, still without a leader as the search for a successor to the late John Smith continues, wins 62 seats.
- 16 June – Sir Norman Fowler resigns as chairman of the Conservative Party.
- 15 June – Britain's railways grind to a virtual standstill with a strike by more than 4,000 signalling staff.
- 29 June – Jonathan Dimbleby's 150-minute film on Charles, Prince of Wales, Charles: The Private Man, the Public Role is broadcast on ITV. When asked if he had remained faithful to his wife (from whom he has been separated for two years), Charles responds "Yes [...] Until it became irretrievably broken down..." The Prince also expresses his view on the equal validity of religious faiths. The broadcast is watched by 13 million people. This evening, Charles's estranged wife, Diana, attends a social event wearing a little black "revenge dress." The following day, the Prince's Private Secretary confirms that the "other woman" in the relationship is Camilla Parker Bowles.
- 30 June
  - Magistrates in Gloucester charge Fred West with a total of 11 murders believed to have been committed between 1967 and 1987, while Rose West is charged with nine murders which are believed to have been committed between 1970 and 1987. On 3 July he is charged with a 12th murder, that of Anna McFall.
  - Helen Liddell, a former aide to Robert Maxwell, is elected as the new Labour MP for Monklands East in the by-election caused by the death of John Smith.

=== July ===
- 14 July – The Queen opens the SIS Building, the new headquarters of MI6 on the banks of the River Thames in London.
- 21 July – Tony Blair wins the Labour Party leadership election defeating John Prescott and Margaret Beckett.
- 26 July – The Embassy of Israel, London is damaged in a bombing.

=== August ===
- 1 August
  - Fire destroys the Norwich Central Library, including most of its historical records.
  - The University of London founds the School of Advanced Study, a group of postgraduate research institutes.
- 13 August – Fifteen-year-old Richard Everitt is stabbed to death in London by a gang of British Bangladeshis in a racially motivated murder.
- 18 August – The first MORI poll since Tony Blair became Labour Party leader gives him a massive boost in his ambition to become prime minister as his party scores at 56% and has a 33-point lead over the Conservatives, who are now just five points ahead of the Liberal Democrats.
- 20 August – Huddersfield Town move into their new all-seater Alfred McAlpine Stadium, which has an initial capacity of 16,000 and will rise to 20,000 later this year on the completion of a third stand; a fourth stand is also planned and would take the capacity to around 25,000.
- 26 August – Sunday Trading Act 1994 (5 July) comes into full effect, permitting retailers to trade on Sundays, though restricting opening times of larger stores to a maximum of six hours, which must be between 10 am and 6 pm. This will have a significant social effect on shopping habits.
- 31 August – The Provisional Irish Republican Army declares a ceasefire.

=== September ===
- September – Lidl, a German discount food supermarket chain, opens its first 10 stores in Britain.
- 2 September – Television entertainer Roy Castle, who became best known to British viewers as the long-running presenter of the BBC children's series Record Breakers, dies from lung cancer at the age of 62.
- 2–4 September – The first Whitby Goth Weekend takes place in Whitby, North Yorkshire, featuring Inkubus Sukkubus, 13 Candles, Nightmoves and All Living Fear.
- 30 September – Aldwych, North Weald and Ongar railway stations on the London Underground close permanently after the last trains run.

=== October ===
- October – Rover Group launches the Rover 100 – a facelifted version of the Metro.
- 10 October – With the economic recovery continuing at a strong rate, unemployment is now falling at twice the rate in Conservative constituencies than in Labour ones, giving the Conservatives hope that they could win the next general election (which has to be held by May 1997) despite Labour having led the way in the opinion polls for virtually all of the two-and-a-half years since the last election.
- 12 October – John Blackburn, the Conservative MP for Dudley West in the West Midlands, dies suddenly of a heart attack aged 61.
- 20 October – Cash-for-questions affair: The Guardian newspaper reports that two Conservative MPs, Neil Hamilton and Tim Smith, took bribes from Harrods chief Mohamed Al-Fayed to ask questions in the House of Commons.
- 30 October – Korean industrial giant Daewoo announces that it will start selling cars in Britain next year, selling directly to customers through its own sales organisation rather than a traditional dealer network.
- 31 October – The Duke of Edinburgh attends a ceremony in Israel where his late mother, Princess Alice of Battenberg, is honoured as "Righteous among the Nations" for sheltering Jewish families from the Nazis in Athens, during World War II.

=== November ===
- 3 November – Royal Assent given to:
  - Criminal Justice and Public Order Act. This changes the right to silence of an accused person, allowing for inferences to be drawn from their silence; increases police powers of "Stop and search" and gives them greater rights to take and retain intimate body samples; changes the law relating to collective trespass to land, criminalising some previously civil offences; tightens the law in some areas relating to obscenity, pornography and sexual offences; and lowers the age of consent for male homosexual acts from twenty-one years to eighteen, while setting the age for female acts at sixteen, for the first time in English law recognising the existence of lesbianism.
  - Marriage Act. This allows civil marriages to be solemnized in certain "approved premises".
- 10 November – BBC One broadcasts the first episode of sitcom The Vicar of Dibley, created by Richard Curtis for Dawn French, who plays the title role.
- 14 November – Eurostar services begin running from London to Paris and to Brussels.
- 15 November – The Daily Telegraph becomes the first national newspaper in Britain to launch an online edition, the Electronic Telegraph. Some 600,000 people in Britain now have access to the internet at home.
- 16 November – Unemployment falls to under 2.5 million for the first time since the end of 1991.
- 19 November – The first UK National Lottery draw takes place.

=== December ===
- December – Rover Group ends production of its long-running Maestro and Montego ranges which were strong sellers during the 1980s but in recent years has been produced in lower volumes due to the success of models like the Rover 200.
- 9 December – First meeting between the British government and Sinn Féin in more than 70 years.
- 14 December – Moors murderer Myra Hindley, who has been in prison since 1966, is informed by the Home Office that she will never be released from prison. She is one of an estimated 15 life sentence prisoners who have been issued with the whole life tariff. The decision was taken by former Home Secretary David Waddington in 1990. Ian Brady who was also jailed with Hindley in May 1966, is also on the list.
- 15 December
  - Tony Blair continues to enjoy dominance in the opinion polls as the latest MORI poll shows Labour support at an unprecedented 61%, putting them a massive 39 points ahead of the Conservatives. The Liberal Democrats have suffered a slump in popularity, with them getting just 13% of the vote in this poll, compared to 20% a year ago.
  - Ian Pearson wins the Dudley West by-election for Labour with nearly 70% of the votes, becoming the new MP for the constituency which was left vacant with the death of Conservative John Blackburn two months ago. The Conservative majority has now fallen to 13 seats.
- 21 December – Air Algérie Flight 702P crashes near Binley, Coventry; all five people on board are killed.
- 28 December – Tony Blair claims that 40% of the workforce have been unemployed at some time since 1989, although there has never been more than 10.6% of the workforce out of work at the same time since then.

=== Undated ===
- Deregulation of the British milk market following the abolition of most functions of the Milk Marketing Board under terms of the Agriculture Act 1993.
- All Saints Church in Dewsbury is raised to the dignity of Dewsbury Minster, the first such modern elevation in the Church of England.

== Publications ==
- Iain M. Banks' novel Feersum Endjinn.
- Edwina Currie's novel A Parliamentary Affair.
- Simon Hopkinson's cookbook Roast Chicken and Other Stories.
- James Kelman's novel How Late It Was, How Late.
- Terry Pratchett's Discworld novels Soul Music and Interesting Times.
- Sexual Behaviour in Britain: the national survey of sexual attitudes and lifestyles by Kaye Wellings et al.

== Births ==
- 3 January – Olivia Bowen, reality television personality
- 14 January – Abi Phillips, singer-songwriter and actress
- 15 January – Eric Dier, footballer
- 17 January – Lucy Boynton, actress
- 18 January – Sam Strike, actor
- 19 January – Alfie Mawson, footballer
- 21 January – Laura Robson, Australian-born tennis player
- 30 January – Amelia Dimoldenberg, media personality
- 1 February – Harry Styles, pop singer-songwriter, member of boyband One Direction
- 6 February – Charlie Heaton, actor
- 12 February – Reece Topley, cricketer
- 14 February – Becky Hill, singer-songwriter
- 22 February – Jake Hill, English racing driver
- 24 February – Ryan Fraser, footballer
- 7 March – Jordan Pickford, goalkeeper
- 10 March – Nikita Parris, footballer
- 11 March – Andy Robertson, footballer
- 11 April – Dakota Blue Richards, actress
- 19 April – Freya Ridings, singer
- 25 April – Sam Fender, singer
- 5 May – Celeste, American-born singer
- 6 May – Emily Campbell, weightlifter
- 21 May – Tom Daley, diver
- 28 May – John Stones, footballer
- 1 June – Ross Greer, Scottish politician
- 19 June – Scarlxrd, rapper
- 23 June – Jamie Borthwick, actor
- 28 June – Madeline Duggan, actress
- 1 July – Fallon Sherrock, darts player
- 6 July – Camilla and Rebecca Rosso, twin actresses
- 21 July – Jamal Lowe, footballer
- 2 August
  - Angus Imrie, actor
  - Courtney Meppen-Walters, footballer (d. 2026)
- 14 August – Maya Jama, television and radio presenter
- 10 September – Hetti Bywater, actress
- 12 September – Mhairi Black, Scottish politician
- 19 September – Alex Etel, English actor
- 20 September – Wallis Day, actress
- 21 September – Ben Proud, English swimmer
- 24 September – Alex Mellor, rugby league player
- 17 October – Ben Duckett, cricketer
- 18 October – Jake Connor, rugby league player
- 1 November – James Ward-Prowse, footballer
- 3 November − Ella Mai, singer
- 6 November − Paul Mullin, footballer
- 9 November – MNEK, singer
- 11 November – Ellie Simmons, paralympic swimmer
- 12 December – Mitchell Pinnock, footballer
- 16 December – Olive Gray, actress
- 28 December – Adam Peaty, swimmer

== Deaths ==
=== January ===
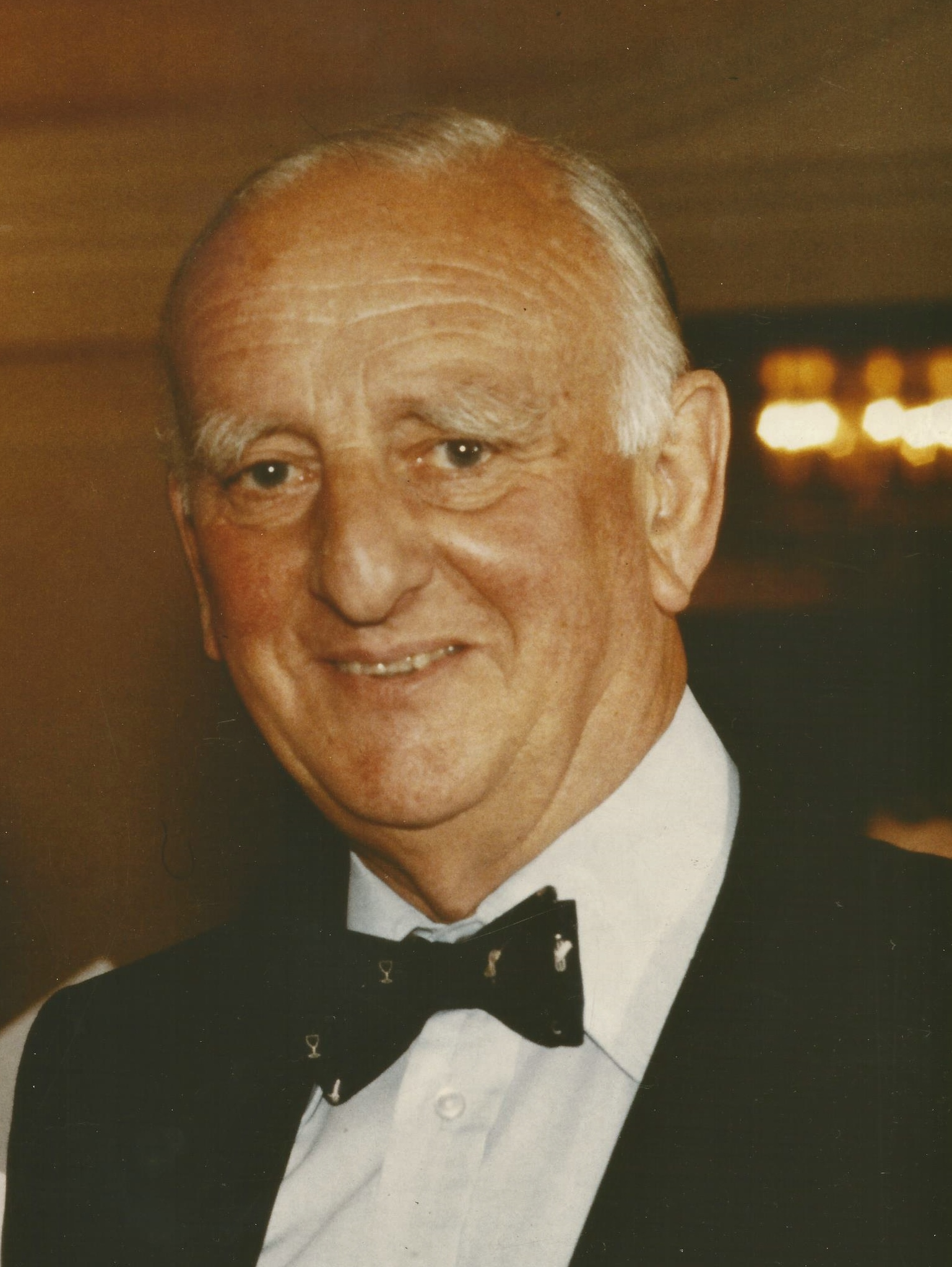
Brian Johnston

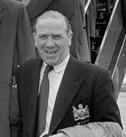
Matt Busby

- 1 January
  - William Chappell, ballet dancer and director (born 1907)
  - Peggy Simpson, actress (born 1913)
  - E. A. Thompson, Marxist historian (born 1914, Ireland)
- 3 January
  - Katharine Elliot, Baroness Elliot of Harwood, politician and public servant (born 1903)
  - Norman Hepple, painter (born 1908); accidentally killed
  - Heather Sears, actress (born 1935)
- 5 January
  - David Bates, physicist and mathematician (born 1916)
  - Brian Johnston, BBC cricket commentator (born 1912)
- 7 January
  - Arthur Dooley, artist and sculptor (born 1929)
  - Llewellyn Rees, actor (born 1901)
- 10 January – Michael Aldridge, actor (born 1920)
- 17 January – Robin Turton, Baron Tranmire, politician (born 1903)
- 20 January – Sir Matt Busby, football player and manager (born 1909)
- 21 January – Tony Waddington, football manager (born 1924)
- 23 January – Brian Redhead, journalist and broadcaster (born 1929)
- 25 January – Jimmy Boyce, politician (born 1947)
- 27 January – Sir Frank Twiss, Royal Navy admiral (born 1910)
- 30 January – Oswald Phipps, 4th Marquess of Normanby, peer and philanthropist (born 1912)

=== February ===
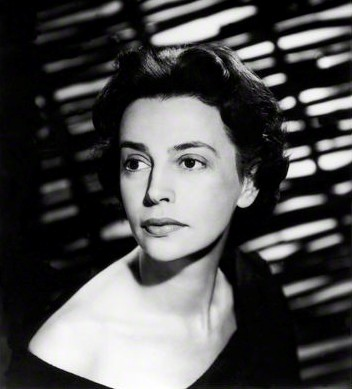
Gwen Watford

- 1 February – Jo Richardson, politician (born 1923)
- 2 February – Anona Winn, actress (born 1904, Australia)
- 3 February – Frederick Copleston, Jesuit priest, philosopher and historian (born 1907)
- 4 February – Jane Arbor, novelist (born 1903)
- 6 February
  - Norman Del Mar, musician and biographer (born 1919)
  - Gwen Watford, actress (born 1927)
- 7 February
  - Stephen Milligan, politician (born 1948)
  - Sir Charles Leslie Richardson, Army general and World War II veteran (born 1908)
- 10 February – Mel Calman, cartoonist (born 1931)
- 11 February – Sir Vincent Wigglesworth, entomologist (born 1899)
- 13 February – Michael Lindsay, 2nd Baron Lindsay of Birker, peer and academic (born 1909)
- 14 February – Margaret Lane, novelist and biographer (born 1907)
- 18 February
  - Ruth Adler, feminist and human rights campaigner (born 1944)
  - John Tedder, 2nd Baron Tedder, peer and chemist (born 1926)
  - Barbara Willard, novelist (born 1929)
- 19 February – Derek Jarman, film director, stage designer, artist and writer (born 1942)
- 27 February – Harold Acton, writer and scholar (born 1904)
- 28 February – Ron Leighton, politician (born 1930)

=== March ===
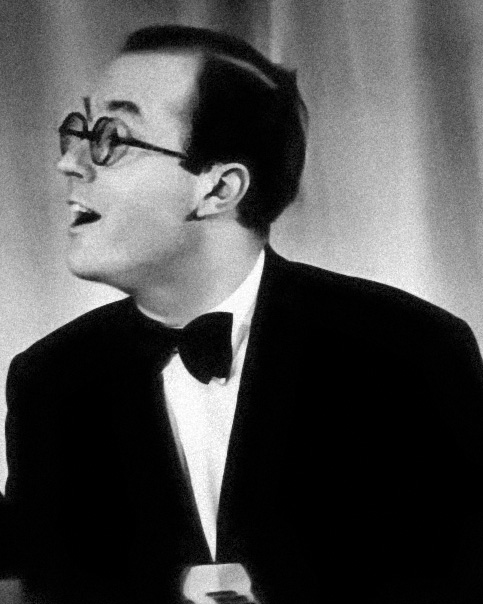
Donald Swann

- 1 March – Tim Souster, musician and writer on music (born 1943)
- 2 March – Donald M. MacKinnon, philosopher and theologian (born 1913)
- 8 March – Rosemary Du Cros, aviator (born 1901)
- 9 March – Jon Kimche, journalist and historian (born 1909, Switzerland)
- 10 March – Rupert Bruce-Mitford, archaeologist (born 1914)
- 11 March
  - Evelyn Gardner, socialite (born 1903)
  - Brenda Wootton, folk singer and poet (born 1928)
- 15 March – Jack Hargreaves, television presenter and writer (born 1911)
- 16 March – Richard Nugent, Baron Nugent of Guildford, politician (born 1907)
- 18 March
  - Andrew Crawford, actor (born 1917)
  - David Ginsburg, politician (born 1921)
- 23 March – Donald Swann, composer (born 1923)
- 27 March – Frances Donaldson, writer and biographer (born 1907)
- 28 March – Richard Brandram, Army major and husband of Princess Katherine of Greece and Denmark (born 1911)
- 29 March – Bill Travers, actor and co-founder of the Born Free Foundation (born 1922)

=== April ===
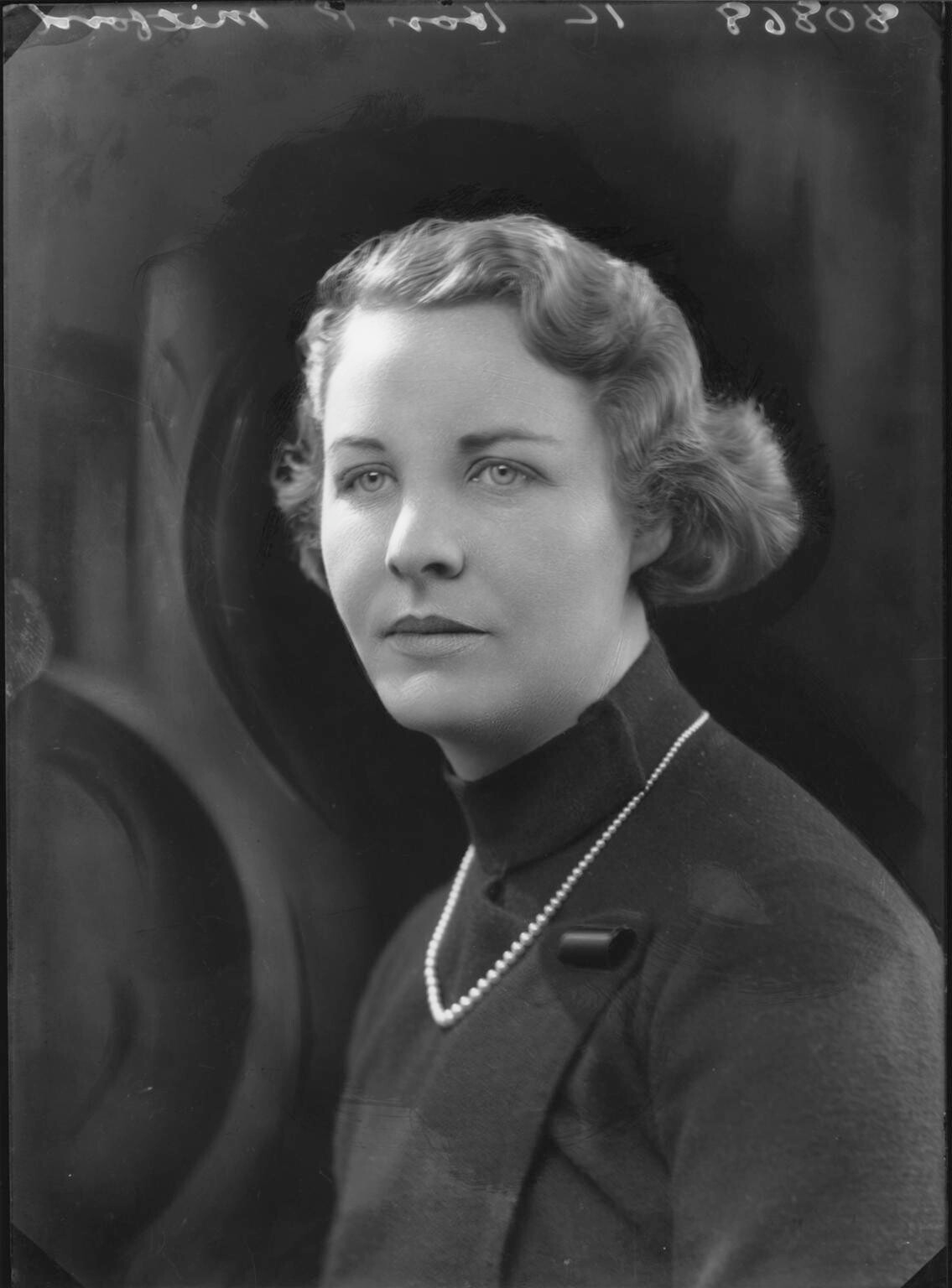
Pamela Mitford

- 1 April – Ian MacDonald Campbell, civil engineer (born 1922)
- 7 April
  - Lee Brilleaux, singer (Dr. Feelgood) (born 1952)
  - Cecil Gould, art historian (born 1918)
- 8 April – Irene Eisinger, opera singer and film actress (born 1903, German Empire)
- 9 April
  - Anthony E. Pratt, musician and inventor of the board game Cluedo (born 1903)
  - Keith Watson, comics artist (born 1935)
- 12 April
  - Bob Cryer, politician (born 1934); car accident
  - Pamela Mitford, socialite and one of the Mitford sisters (born 1907)
- 13 April – Bert Ramelson, communist politician (born 1910)
- 14 April – Evelyn King, politician (born 1907)
- 15 April – John Curry, figure skater (born 1949)
- 16 April – Leslie Flint, psychic medium (born 1911)
- 19 April
  - Michael Carreras, film director and producer (born 1927)
  - Tommy McCue, rugby league player (born 1913)
- 25 April – David Langton, actor (born 1912)
- 27 April – Lynne Frederick, actress (born 1954)
- 30 April – Herbert Bowden, Baron Aylestone, politician (born 1905)

=== May ===
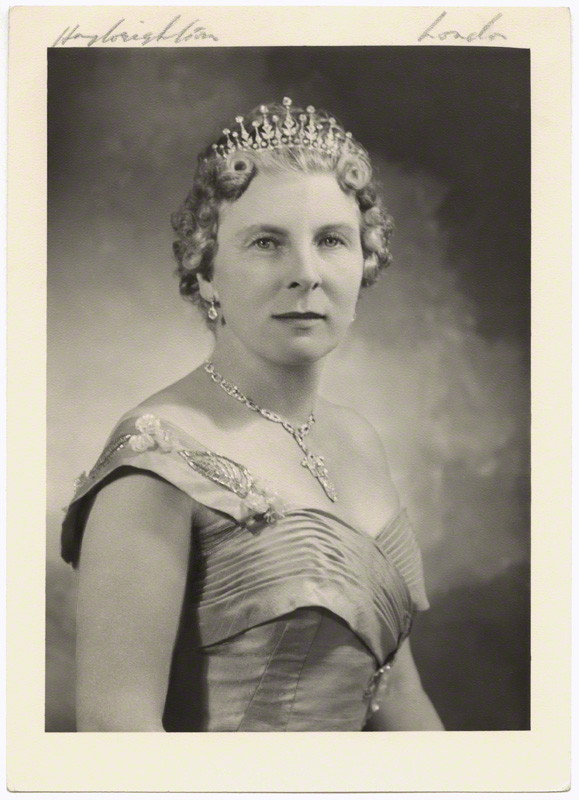
Lady May Abel Smith

- 8 May – Lady Victoria Wemyss, last surviving godchild of Queen Victoria (born 1890)
- 11 May – Alfred James Broomhall, missionary to China (born 1911)
- 12 May
  - Sir Alfred Beit, 2nd Baronet, politician, art collector and philanthropist (born 1903)
  - John Smith, Leader of the Labour Party and Leader of the Opposition (born 1938)
- 13 May – Duncan Hamilton, racing driver (born 1920)
- 14 May – Brian Roper, actor and estate agent (born 1929)
- 15 May – Alexander Nove, economist and economic historian (born 1915, Russian Empire)
- 19 May – Joseph Chatt, chemist (born 1914)
- 20 May – Ingrid Hafner, actress (born 1936)
- 21 May
  - Ralph Miliband, sociologist and father of David and Ed Miliband (born 1924)
  - Cliff Wilson, snooker player (born 1934)
- 23 May – Joan Vickers, Baroness Vickers, politician (born 1907)
- 24 May – John Wain, novelist, poet and critic (born 1925)
- 29 May
  - Lady May Abel Smith, British royalty (born 1906)
  - Peter Cranmer, sportsman (born 1914)
- 30 May – Donald Hill, science historian (born 1922)
- 31 May – Sidney Gilliat, film director, producer and writer (born 1908)

=== June ===
- 3 June – Stuart Blanch, former archbishop of York (born 1918)
- 4 June
  - Derek Leckenby, guitarist (born 1943)
  - Peter Thorneycroft, Baron Thorneycroft, politician, Chancellor of the Exchequer (1957–1958) (born 1909)
- 6 June
  - Peter Graves, 8th Baron Graves, peer and actor (born 1911)
  - Mark McManus, Scottish actor (born 1935)
- 7 June – Dennis Potter, screenwriter (born 1935)
- 12 June – William Elgin Swinton, paleontolgist (born 1900)
- 14 June
  - Lionel Grigson, jazz musician (born 1942)
  - Denys Hay, historian (born 1915)
- 16 June – Eileen Way, actress (born 1911)
- 17 June
  - Len White, footballer (born 1930)
  - Frank Yates, statistician (born 1902)
- 19 June – Anthony Coke, 6th Earl of Leicester, peer (born 1909)
- 22 June – Jack Davies, screenwriter (born 1913)
- 24 June – Leon MacLaren, philosopher (born 1910)
- 26 June – Thomas Armstrong, organist, composer, conductor and educationalist (born 1898)

=== July ===
Dorothy Hodgkin

- 3 July – Felix Kelly, designer and artist (born 1914, New Zealand)
- 5 July – Charles Comfort, Scottish-born painter, sculptor, teacher and writer (born 1900)
- 6 July – Geoff McQueen, screenwriter (born 1947)
- 9 July – Trevor King, Ulster loyalist (born 1953); murdered
- 12 July
  - James Joll, historian (born 1918)
  - David Malcolm Lewis, historian (born 1928)
- 14 July – Rosalind Shand, aristocrat and mother of Queen Camilla (born 1921)
- 21 July – John Ernest, American-born constructivist artist (born 1922)
- 23 July – John Marlow Thompson, World War II air ace (born 1914)
- 25 July
  - Walter Baxter, novelist (born 1915)
  - Jack Clemo, poet and writer (born 1916)
- 26 July – Terry Scott, comic actor (born 1927)
- 28 July – Bernard Delfont, theatrical impresario (born 1909, Russian Empire)
- 29 July – Dorothy Hodgkin, chemist, Nobel Prize laureate (born 1910)
- 30 July – Derek Raymond, crime writer (born 1931)
- 31 July
  - Anne Shelton, singer (born 1923)
  - Caitlin Thomas, author and wife of Dylan Thomas (born 1913)

=== August ===
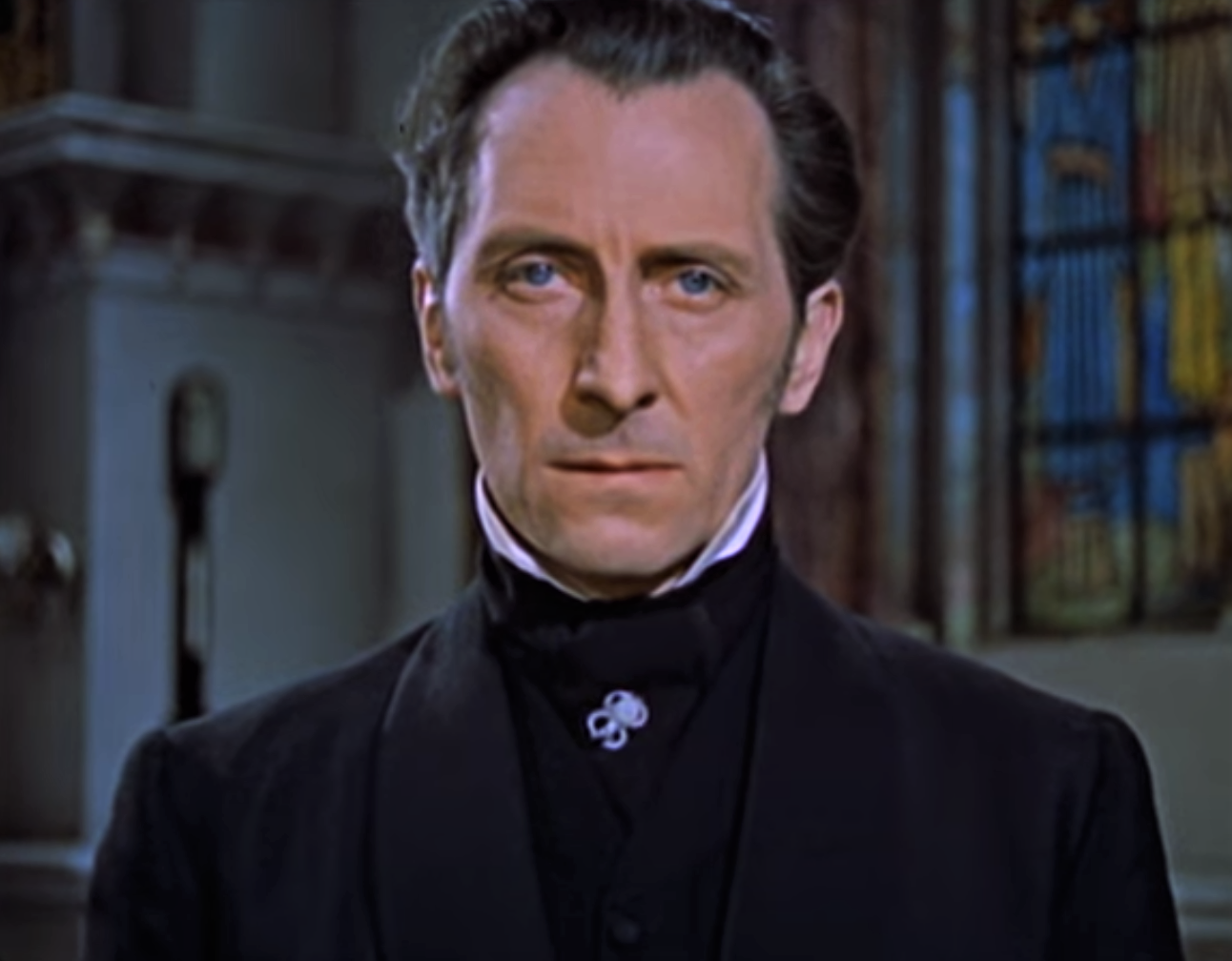
Peter Cushing

- 1 August – Romilly Lunge, actor (born 1904)
- 4 August – Solomon Adler, economist and Soviet spy (born 1909)
- 7 August – Larry Martyn, comic actor (born 1934)
- 11 August
  - Gordon Cullen, architect and urban designer (born 1914)
  - Peter Cushing, actor (born 1913)
- 14 August – Joan Harrison, screenwriter (born 1907)
- 15 August – Syd Dale, composer (born 1924)
- 18 August
  - John Beavan, Baron Ardwick, journalist (born 1910)
  - Richard Laurence Millington Synge, chemist and Nobel Prize winner (born 1914)
- 19 August – Nancy Lancaster, interior designer (born 1897)
- 27 August – Fred Griffiths, actor (born 1912)
- 29 August
  - Marea Hartman, athletics administrator (born 1920)
  - Arthur Mourant, chemist, haematologist and geneticist (born 1904)
- 30 August – Lindsay Anderson, film and theatre director (born 1923)

=== September ===
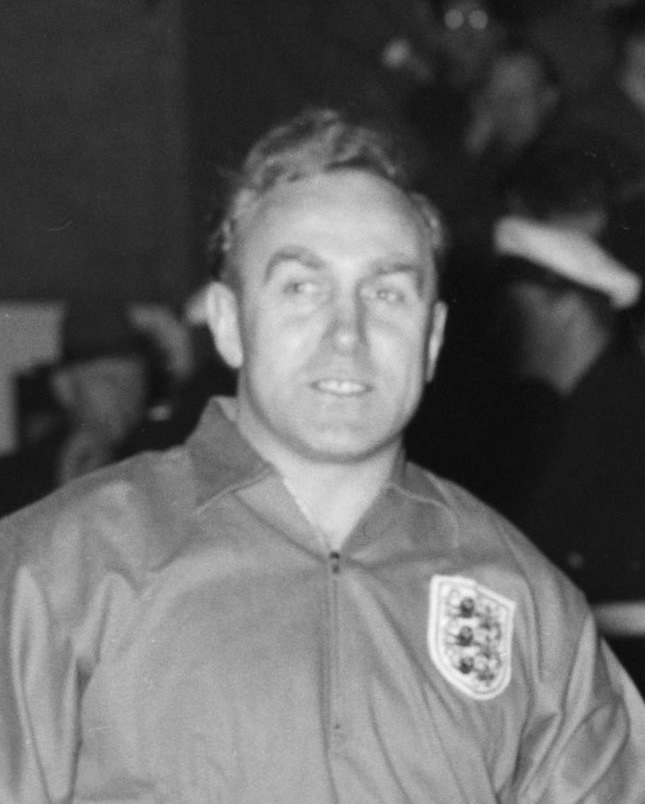
Billy Wright

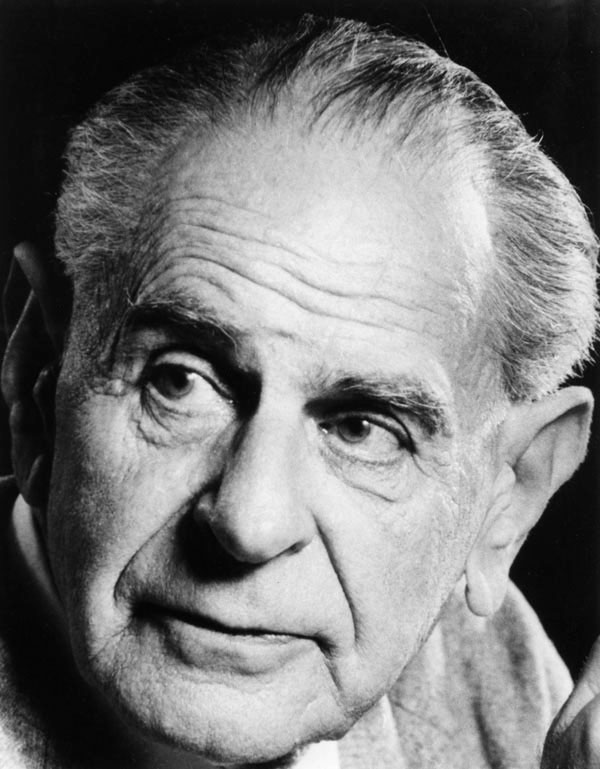
Karl Popper

- 2 September – Roy Castle, actor and entertainer (born 1932)
- 3 September – Billy Wright, footballer, football manager and husband of Joy Beverley (born 1924)
- 4 September
  - Mark Bonham Carter, Baron Bonham-Carter, publisher and politician (born 1922)
  - Roger Thomas, politician (born 1925)
- 6 September – Nicky Hopkins, pianist and organist (born 1944)
- 7 September – Eric Crozier, theatrical director and opera librettist (born 1914)
- 8 September – Margaret Guido, archaeologist (born 1912)
- 9 September – Donald Court, paediatrician (born 1912)
- 11 September – Jessica Tandy, actress (born 1909)
- 13 September – John Stevens, rock drummer (born 1940)
- 16 September – Johnny Berry, footballer (born 1926)
- 17 September – Sir Karl Popper, philosopher, academic and social commentator (born 1902, Austria-Hungary)
- 22 September
  - Leonard Feather, jazz pianist and composer (born 1914)
  - Andrew Rothstein, journalist (born 1898)
  - Edward Shackleton, Baron Shackleton, geographer, RAF officer and politician (born 1911)
- 25 September – Mark Abrams, sociologist (born 1906)
- 26 September – Maurice Ashley, historian (born 1907)
- 29 September – Oswald Nock, railway signal engineer and writer on railways (born 1905)
- 30 September – Alex Scott, racehorse trainer (born 1960); murdered

=== October ===
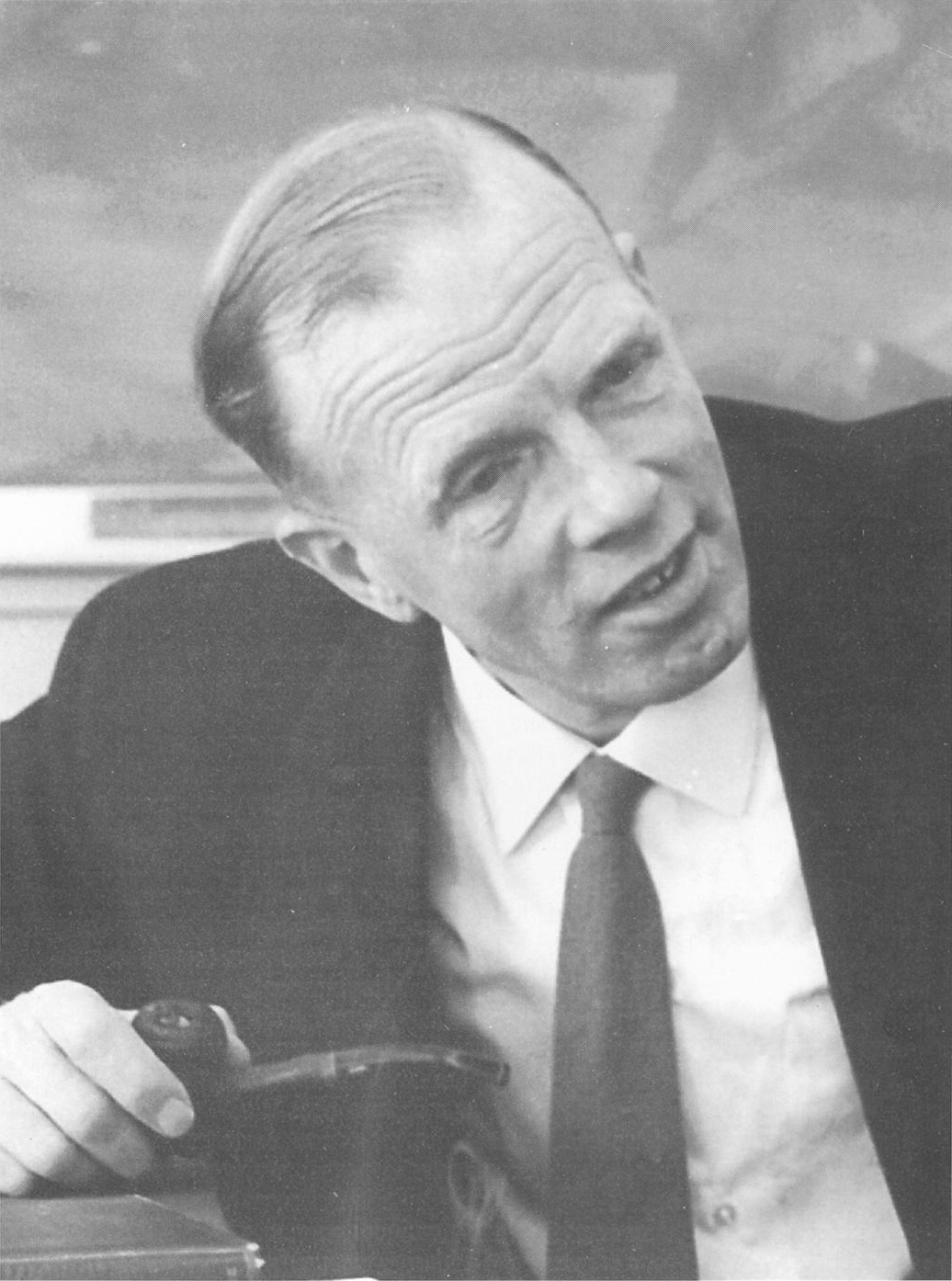
Philip Burton Moon

- 1 October – Ron Herron, architect (born 1930)
- 2 October – Matthew Black, Scottish minister and biblical scholar (born 1908)
- 7 October – James Hill, film director (born 1919)
- 8 October – Diana Churchill, actress (born 1913)
- 9 October – Philip Burton Moon, nuclear physicist (born 1907)
- 10 October – Richard J. C. Atkinson, archaeologist (born 1920)
- 12 October – John Blackburn, politician (born 1933)
- 14 October – Gioconda de Vito, violinist (born 1907, Italy)
- 16 October
  - Peter Bromilow, actor (born 1933)
  - Monja Danischewsky, film producer and writer (born 1911, Russian Empire)
- 20 October – Robert Medley, artist (born 1905)
- 22 October – Harold Hopkins, physicist (born 1918)
- 23 October – Jack Gibson, schoolmaster and mountaineer (born 1908)
- 28 October
  - William Boon, chemist (born 1911)
  - Marcia Anastasia Christoforides, philanthropist, art collector and racehorse owner (born 1909)
- 31 October – Sir John Pope-Hennessy, art historian (born 1913)

=== November ===
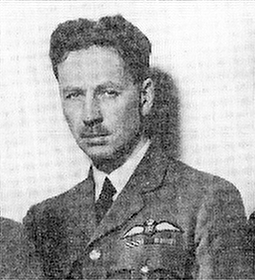
George Douglas-Hamilton, 10th Earl of Selkirk

- 3 November – Archibald Stinchcombe, ice hockey player (born 1912)
- 5 November – Patrick Dean, diplomat (born 1909)
- 8 November – Marianne Straub, textile designer (born 1909, Switzerland)
- 9 November – Ralph Michael, actor (born 1907)
- 11 November
  - Stephen Dykes Bower, church architect (born 1903)
  - Ernest Clark, actor (born 1912)
  - Elizabeth Maconchy, composer (born 1907)
- 12 November – Michael Innes, novelist (born 1906)
- 13 November – John Bishop Harman, physician (born 1907)
- 14 November – Humphry Berkeley, politician (born 1926)
- 15 November – Janet Ahlberg, children's writer (born 1944)
- 16 November – Doris Speed, actress (born 1899)
- 18 November – Michael Somes, ballet dancer (born 1917)
- 19 November – Julian Symons, crime writer and poet (born 1912)
- 23 November – Austen Albu, politician (born 1903)
- 24 November – George Douglas-Hamilton, 10th Earl of Selkirk, peer and politician (born 1906)
- 26 November – David Bache, automobile designer (born 1925)
- 28 November
  - Charles Howard, 12th Earl of Carlisle, peer (born 1923)
  - Ian Serraillier, novelist and poet (born 1912)

=== December ===
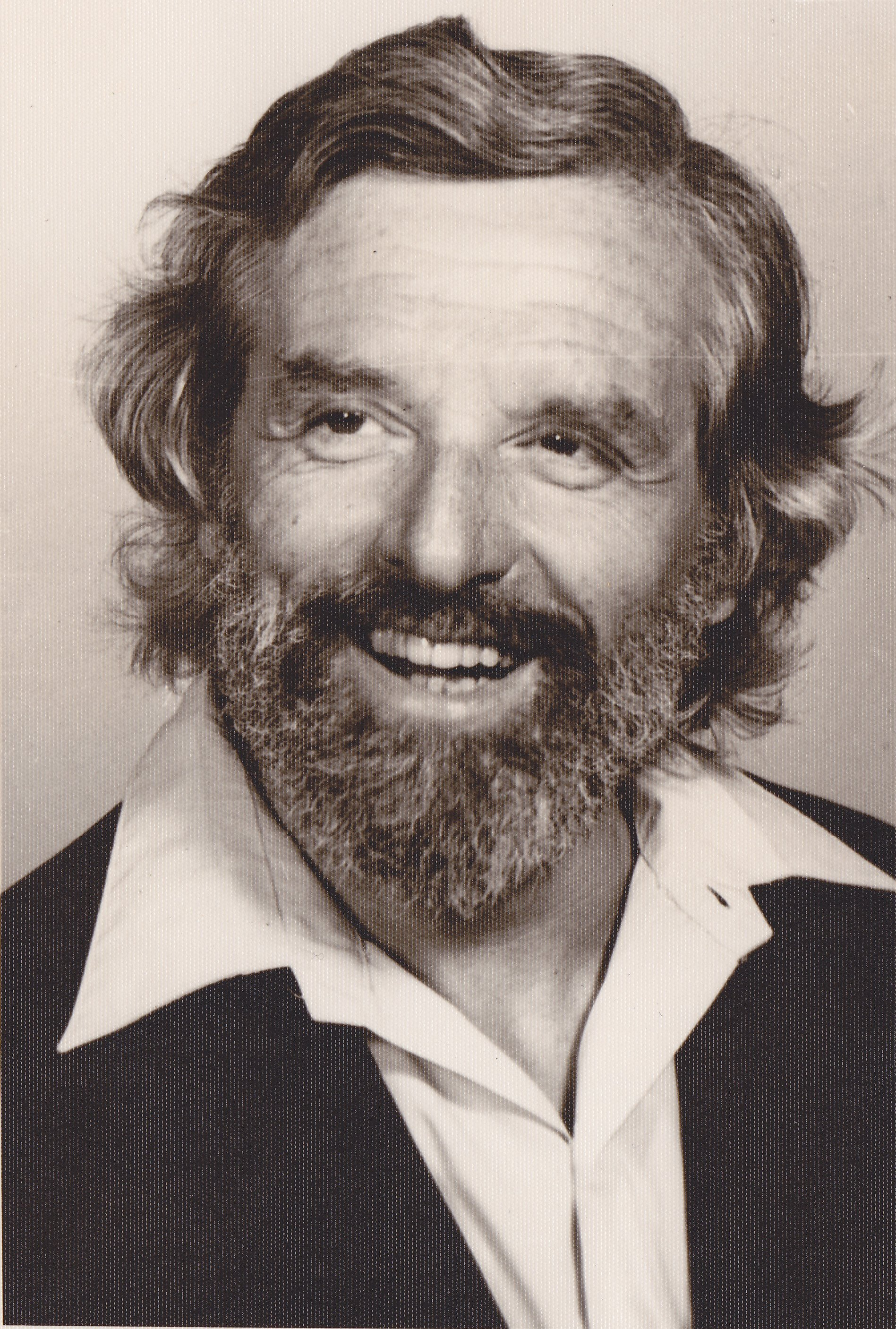
Heinz Bernard

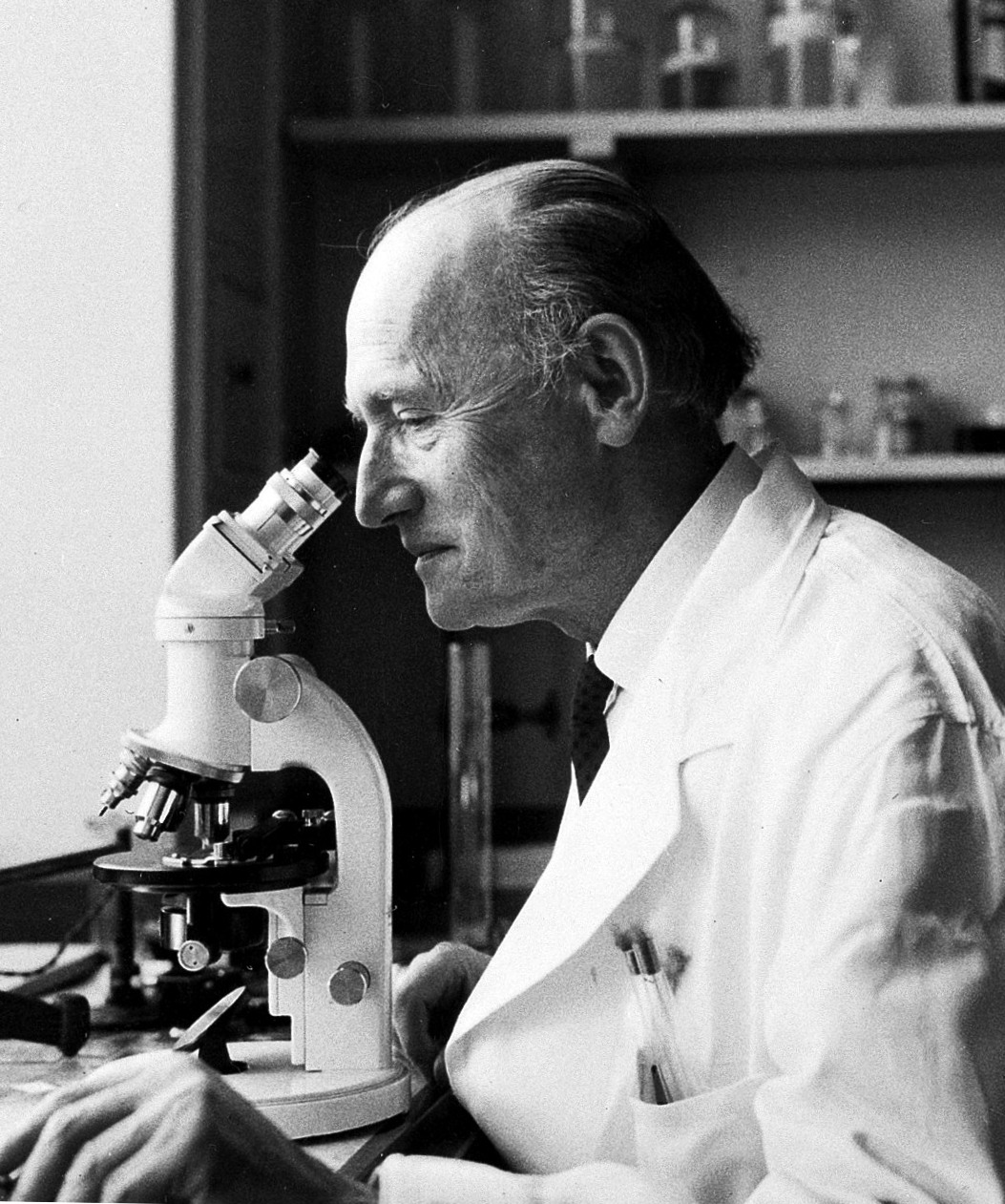
Cyril Garnham

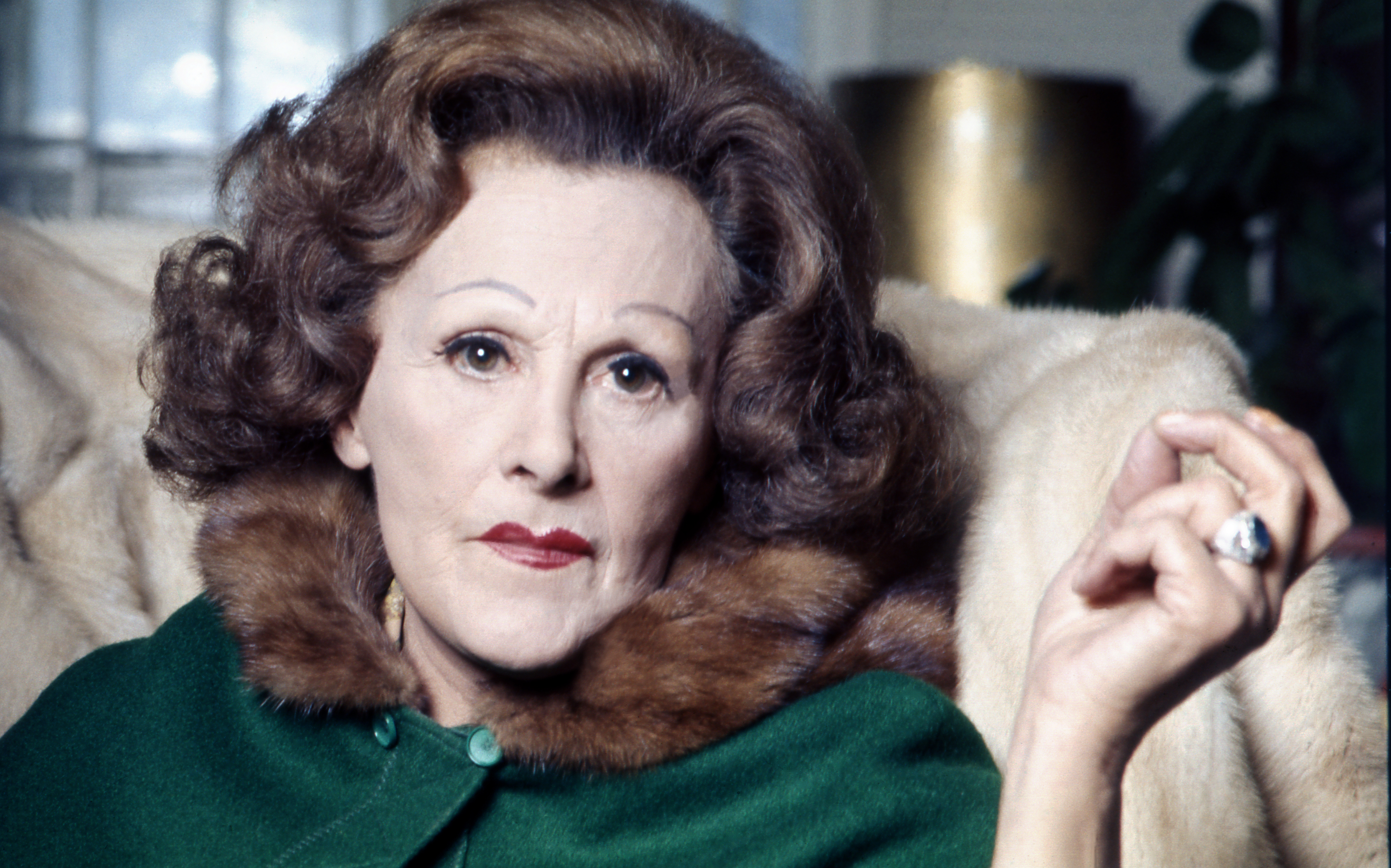
Fanny Cradock

- 4 December – Sir Geoffrey Elton, historian (born 1921, Germany)
- 6 December – Alun Owen, actor and screenwriter (born 1925)
- 10 December – Keith Joseph, lawyer and politician (born 1918)
- 12 December – Sir Evelyn Shuckburgh, diplomat (born 1909)
- 13 December – Norman Beaton, actor (born 1934, British Guiana)
- 14 December – Sir Edmund Hudleston, RAF officer (born 1908)
- 15 December – Mollie Phillips, figure skater (born 1907)
- 18 December
  - Heinz Bernard, actor and theatre manager (born 1923)
  - David Pitt, Baron Pitt of Hampstead, politician and physician (born 1913)
- 19 December – James Elphinstone, 18th Lord Elphinstone, Scottish peer (born 1953)
- 20 December – Phelim O'Neill, 2nd Baron Rathcavan, peer and politician (born 1909)
- 21 December – Mabel Poulton, actress (born 1901)
- 22 December – John Arthur Todd, mathematician (born 1908)
- 23 December – Sebastian Shaw, actor and writer (born 1905)
- 24 December – John Osborne, actor and playwright (born 1929)
- 25 December – Cyril Garnham, parasitologist (born 1901)
- 26 December – Jock Campbell, Baron Campbell of Eskan, businessman (born 1912)
- 27 December
  - Fanny Cradock, cookery writer and TV chef (born 1909)
  - Steve Plytas, actor (born 1913, Ottoman Empire)
- 30 December – Maureen Starkey Tigrett, hairdresser and first wife of Ringo Starr (born 1946)

== See also ==
- 1994 in British music
- 1994 in British television
- List of British films of 1994
