= 1994 in British radio =

This is a list of events in British radio during 1994.

== Events ==
=== January ===
- 7 January – BBC Radio Sussex and BBC Radio Surrey are merged and the new station is temporarily named BBC Radio Sussex and Surrey prior to a full relaunch as BBC Southern Counties Radio.
- 10 January
  - Steve Wright becomes Radio 1's new breakfast show presenter.
  - Also on Radio 1, the teatime edition of Newsbeat returns after four years. The bulletin airs in its old slot of 5:30 pm to 5:45 pm.
- Essex Radio relaunches as Essex FM.

=== February ===
- 1 February – A radio station at HM Prison Feltham in London begins broadcasting, and is the origin of National Prison Radio.
- 21 February – BBC Radio 4 launches a new weekday afternoon magazine show Anderson Country, presented by Gerry Anderson. The programme proves divisive amongst the station's listenership and is replaced after a year by The Afternoon Shift.

=== March ===
- 5 March – Radio Trent's Derbyshire service is renamed Ram FM.
- 7 March – Following the purchase by GWR of Mercia FM, Xtra AM is replaced by a Mercia-branded relay of Classic Gold and at around the same time, GWR replaces The World's Greatest Music Station in Peterborough with Classic Gold 1332, whose only Peterborough-based show is the breakfast show.
- 18 March – BBC Radio Kent stops broadcasting on 1035 kHz MW. The frequency is reallocated to commercial radio to allow a new London-wide station to start broadcasting.
- 27 March – The original BBC Radio 5 signs off after three and a half years on air.
- 28 March – BBC Radio 5 Live launches at 5 am, with the educational and children's elements of Radio 5's programming replaced by rolling news. Jane Garvey is the first voice on air. At 2 am the following morning 5 Live broadcasts the first edition of its overnight Up All Night show.

=== April ===
- 2 April
  - Out This Week, Britain's first national news programme for lesbians and gay men, launches on BBC Radio 5 Live.
  - The first edition of Classic Gardening Forum is broadcast on Classic FM. The programme launches following the transfer of the production of BBC Radio 4's long-running gardening programme Gardeners' Question Time to an independent company upon which the entire previous panel is dismissed. They consequently move to Classic FM on a short-term contract to present Classic Gardening Forum, which runs for 60 minutes as a mixture of gardening tips and music.
- 3 April – The closure of BBC Radio 5 sees children's programmes return to Radio 4. However, instead of daily programmes, just one weekly 30-minute programme is broadcast, airing on Sunday evenings.
- 8 April – Following the closure of BBC Radio 5, Test Match Special is broadcast on BBC Radio 4’s long wave frequency for the first time.
- 10 April – Radio 5's closure sees adult education and Open University programmes return to Radio 4. They are broadcast on long wave only as a two-hour block on Sunday evenings. Open University programmes are broadcast between February and September with language courses aired from October until January.
- April – Pick of the Pops returns, on Capital Gold.

=== May ===
- 8 May – (Sunday) In the early hours, Annie Nightingale launches her career as a club music DJ, presenting the first edition of The Chill Out Zone on BBC Radio 1.

=== June ===
- Undated in June
  - BBC Radio 1 begins broadcasting announcements on its medium wave frequency voiced by Nicky Campbell telling listeners to retune to FM because it will no longer be broadcasting on medium wave from 1 July.
  - Following the purchase of Cambridge station CNFM by GWR, the station is relaunched as Q103.
  - The name Victory, as a radio station for the Portsmouth area, is re-invented eight years after Radio Victory had stopped broadcasting. The name is resurrected to broadcast a 28-day restricted service licence (RSL) to mark the city's 800th birthday and the 50th anniversary of D-Day. The station returns for a second RSL over the Christmas period of 1994 and again in 1995 to mark VE Day's 50th anniversary.
- 20 June – Fortune 1458 launches in Manchester, headed by former Piccadilly Radio boss Colin Walters. The station uses BBC Radio Manchester's old MW frequency.
- 29 June – The Radio Authority receives 41 applications for six London-wide licenses.

=== July ===
- 1 July – BBC Radio 1's stops broadcasting on mediumwave. Stephen Duffy's "Kiss Me" is the last record played on MW just before 9 am.
- 15 July – BFBS ceases broadcasts in Berlin following the end of the Cold War, German reunification, and the withdrawal of British forces from the city, after 33 years.

=== August ===
- 1 August – BBC Southern Counties Radio is launched as the first BBC Local Radio station to adopt an all-talk format.
- 28 August – London jungle music pirate station Don FM commences broadcasting under a restricted service licence, the first of its genre to do so.

=== September ===
- 1–16 September – The UK's first five regional commercial stations start broadcasting.

=== October ===
- 5 October – News Direct 97.3FM and London News Talk 1152AM begin broadcasting. They replace LBC Newstalk and London Talkback Radio. The change occurs following last year's decision by the Radio Authority not to renew LBC's licence, instead giving it to London News Radio, a consortium led by former LBC staff and backed by Guinness Mahon which has subsequently bought out the LBC business.
- 8 October – Virgin 1215 is awarded one of the new FM licences advertised in London. The station applied for a London licence after attempts to persuade authorities to allow it to broadcast nationally on FM had failed. The other three newly licensed stations are Heart 106.2, Premier Christian Radio and Viva 963.

=== November ===
- No events.

=== December ===
- 31 December – This is the final day on air for DevonAir and Buzz FM. The stations have lost their licenses to Gemini Radio and Choice FM respectively.

== Station debuts ==
- 7 March – Manchester United Radio
- 28 March – BBC Radio 5 Live
- 15 April – Mix 96
- 6 June – NECR
- 20 June – Fortune 1458
- 4 July – 97.2 Stray FM
- 1 August –
  - BBC Southern Counties Radio
  - Nevis Radio
- 1 September –
  - Country 1035
  - 100.4 Jazz FM
  - 100–102 Century Radio
- 4 September – Galaxy 101
- 6 September – 100.7 Heart FM
- 16 September – Scot FM
- 5 October – News Direct 97.3FM and London News Talk 1152AM
- 16 October – Kiss 102
- 22 October – Oasis Radio

== Programme debuts ==
- 10 January
  - Why Bother? on BBC Radio 3 (1994)
  - Steve Wright in the Morning on BBC Radio 1 1994 – April 1995.
- 28 March – Wake Up to Money on BBC Radio 5 Live (1994–Present)
- 29 March – Up All Night on BBC Radio 5 Live (1994–Present)
- 19 May – Collins and Maconie's Hit Parade on BBC Radio 1 (1994–1997)
- 8 June – Ballylenon on BBC Radio 4 (1994–2011)
- 22 June – Julie Enfield Investigates on BBC Radio 4 (1994–1999)
- 19 July – Lee and Herring on BBC Radio 1 (1994–1995)
- 22 November – Gush on BBC Radio 4 (1994)
- Unknown – Alan's Big One with Alan Davies on BBC Radio 1 (1994–1995)

== Continuing radio programmes ==
=== 1940s ===
- Sunday Half Hour (1940–2018)
- Desert Island Discs (1942–Present)
- Letter from America (1946–2004)
- Woman's Hour (1946–Present)
- A Book at Bedtime (1949–Present)

=== 1950s ===
- The Archers (1950–Present)
- The Today Programme (1957–Present)
- Sing Something Simple (1959–2001)
- Your Hundred Best Tunes (1959–2007)

=== 1960s ===
- Farming Today (1960–Present)
- In Touch (1961–Present)
- The World at One (1965–Present)
- The Official Chart (1967–Present)
- Just a Minute (1967–Present)
- The Living World (1968–Present)
- The Organist Entertains (1969–2018)

=== 1970s ===
- PM (1970–Present)
- Start the Week (1970–Present)
- Week Ending (1970–1998)
- You and Yours (1970–Present)
- I'm Sorry I Haven't a Clue (1972–Present)
- Good Morning Scotland (1973–Present)
- Kaleidoscope (1973–1998)
- Newsbeat (1973–Present)
- The News Huddlines (1975–2001)
- File on 4 (1977–Present)
- Money Box (1977–Present)
- The News Quiz (1977–Present)
- Breakaway (1979–1998)
- Feedback (1979–Present)
- The Food Programme (1979–Present)
- Science in Action (1979–Present)

=== 1980s ===
- In Business (1983–Present)
- Sounds of the 60s (1983–Present)
- Loose Ends (1986–Present)

=== 1990s ===
- The Moral Maze (1990–Present)
- Essential Selection (1991–Present)
- No Commitments (1992–2007)
- The Mark Steel Solution (1992–1996)
- The Masterson Inheritance (1993–1995)
- Harry Hill's Fruit Corner (1993–1997)
- The Pepsi Chart (1993–2002)
- Wake Up to Wogan (1993–2009)
- Essential Mix (1993–Present)

== Ending this year ==
- 25 March – Room 101 (1992–1994)
- Unknown – Formula Five (1990–1994)

== Closing this year ==
- 7 January – BBC Radio Surrey (1991–1994) and BBC Radio Sussex (1968–1994)
- 27 March – BBC Radio 5 (1990–1994)
- 5 October – LBC (1973–1994) and London Newstalk Radio (1989–1994)
- 31 December –
  - Buzz FM (1990–1994)
  - DevonAir (1980–1994)
- Unknown – The World's Greatest Music Station (1992–1994)

== Births ==
- 14 August – Maya Jama, broadcast presenter

== Deaths ==
- 5 January – Brian Johnston, 81, cricket commentator and radio presenter
- 2 February – Anona Winn, 90, broadcasting personality
- 23 January – Brian Redhead, 64, author, journalist and broadcaster

== See also ==
- 1994 in British music
- 1994 in British television
- 1994 in the United Kingdom
- List of British films of 1994
