= List of British films of 1994 =

A list of British films released in 1994.

== 1994 ==
Title	Director	Cast	Genre	Notes
1994
Backbeat	Iain Softley	Sheryl Lee, Stephen Dorff, Ian Hart	Biopic	
Being Human	Bill Forsyth	Robin Williams, John Turturro, Theresa Russell, Ewan McGregor	Comedy Drama	
Beyond Bedlam	Vadim Jean	Craig Fairbrass, Elizabeth Hurley	Horror	
Black Beauty	Caroline Thompson	Alan Cumming, Andrew Knott, Sean Bean	Family	
The Browning Version	Mike Figgis	Albert Finney, Greta Scacchi	Drama	Entered into the 1994 Cannes Film Festival
A Business Affair	Charlotte Brandstrom	Christopher Walken, Carole Bouquet	Comedy	Co-production with France, Spain and Germany
Captives	Angela Pope	Julia Ormond, Tim Roth	Crime/romance	
The Crane	Phil O'Shea	Jude Law, Lee Ross	Drama	Short film
Deadly Advice	Mandie Fletcher	Jane Horrocks, Brenda Fricker, Imelda Staunton	Comedy drama	
Death and the Maiden	Roman Polanski	Sigourney Weaver, Ben Kingsley	Drama	
Death Machine	Stephen Norrington"	Ely Pouget	Horror/Science fiction	Co-production with Japan
The Englishman Who Went Up a Hill But Came Down a Mountain	Christopher Monger	Hugh Grant, Tara Fitzgerald, Colm Meaney	Comedy/drama	
Four Weddings and a Funeral	Mike Newell	Hugh Grant, Andie MacDowell, James Fleet	Romance/comedy	Won the BAFTA for Best Film
A Good Man in Africa	Bruce Beresford	Sean Connery, John Lithgow, Louis Gossett Jr., Diana Rigg	Comedy/drama	
Immortal Beloved	Bernard Rose	Gary Oldman, Isabella Rossellini	Biopic	The life of Beethoven
Ladybird, Ladybird	Ken Loach	Crissy Rock, Vladimir Vega	Drama	Crissy Rock won the Silver Bear for Best Actress at Berlin.
Little Buddha	Bernardo Bertolucci	Keanu Reeves, Bridget Fonda	Drama	Co-production with Italy and France
The Madness of King George	Nicholas Hytner	Nigel Hawthorne, Helen Mirren, Ian Holm	Historical	
A Man of No Importance	Suri Krishnamma	Albert Finney, Brenda Fricker, Michael Gambon	Drama	
Nostradamus	Roger Christian	Tchéky Karyo, F. Murray Abraham	Biopic	Co-production
Oleanna	David Mamet	William H. Macy, Debra Einstadt	Drama	
A Pin for the Butterfly	Hannah Kodicek	Ian Bannen, Florence Hoath	Drama	Co-production with the Czech Republic
Priest	Antonia Bird	Linus Roache, Tom Wilkinson, Robert Carlyle	Drama	
Prince of Jutland	Gabriel Axel	Gabriel Byrne, Helen Mirren	Drama	Co-production; based on Shakespeare's Hamlet
Princess Caraboo	Michael Austin	Phoebe Cates, Jim Broadbent, Wendy Hughes	Comedy	
Second Best	Chris Menges	William Hurt, Jane Horrocks	Drama	
Shallow Grave	Danny Boyle	Kerry Fox, Christopher Eccleston, Ewan McGregor	Thriller	
Shopping	Paul W. S. Anderson	Sadie Frost, Jude Law	Science fiction	Co-production with Japan, Germany & US
Staggered	Martin Clunes	Martin Clunes, Michael Praed	Comedy	
To Die For	Peter Mackenzie Litten	Thomas Arklie, Ian Williams, Tony Slattery	Comedy/drama	
Tom & Viv	Brian Gilbert	Willem Dafoe, Miranda Richardson, Rosemary Harris	Biographical drama	
White Angel	Chris Jones	Harriet Robinson, Peter Firth	Thriller	
Widows' Peak	John Irvin	Mia Farrow, Natasha Richardson, Adrian Dunbar	Romance	

== See also ==
- 1994 in film
- 1994 in British music
- 1994 in British radio
- 1994 in British television
- 1994 in the United Kingdom
- List of 1994 box office number-one films in the United Kingdom
