= Minister of State for Social Security and Disability =

Ministerial role in the British government

United Kingdom Minister of State for Social Security and Disability
- Royal Arms as used by His Majesty's Government

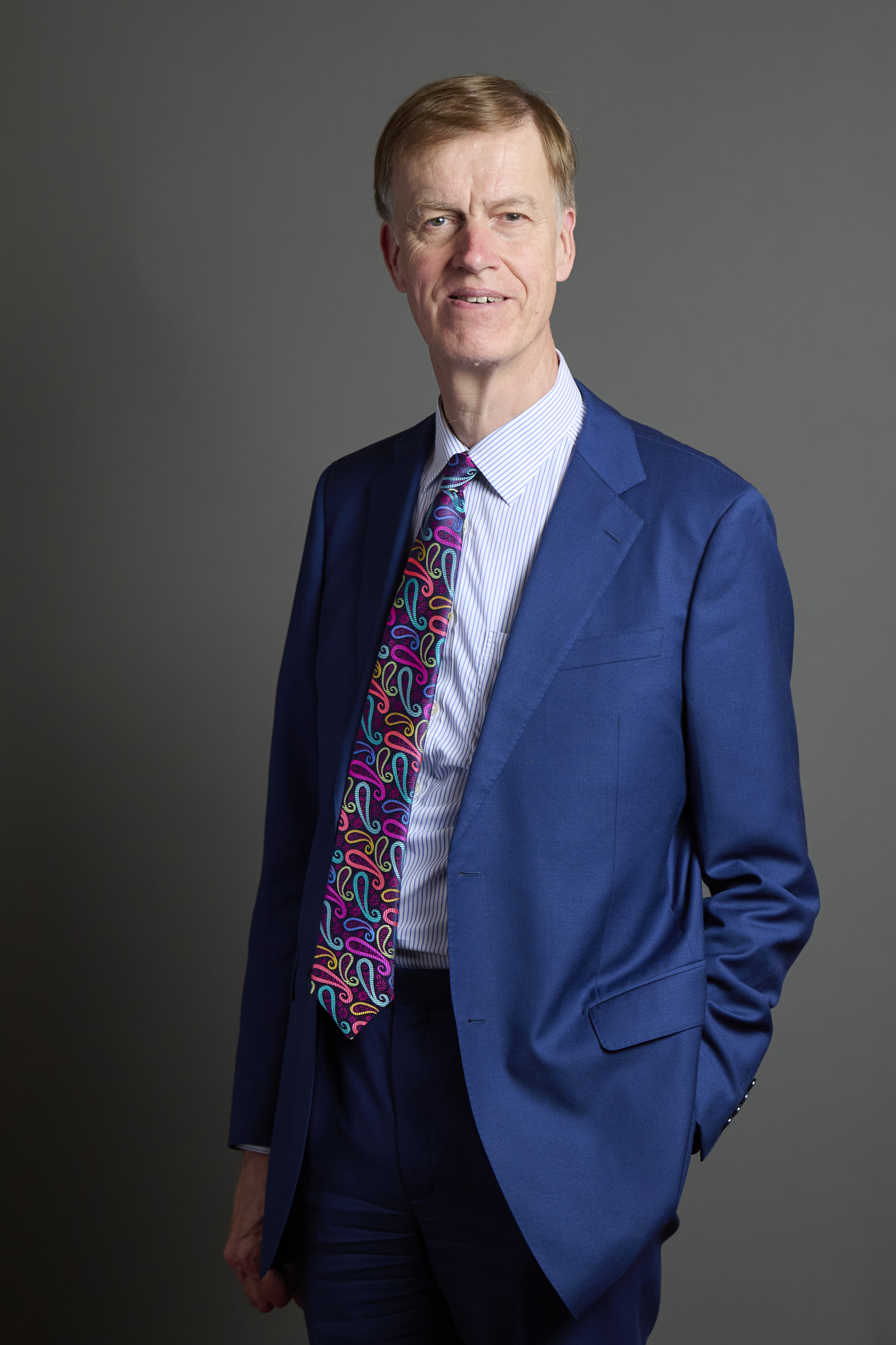
- Incumbent; Stephen Timms since 8 July 2024
- Department for Work and Pensions; Office for Equality and Opportunity
- Appointer: The Monarch (on the advice of the Prime Minister)
- Inaugural holder: Alf Morris
- Formation: 1974
- Website: Official website

The Minister of State for Social Security and Disability is a junior minister in the Department for Work and Pensions of the United Kingdom government, with responsibility for disabled people. The role has also been known as the Parliamentary Under Secretary of State for Disabled People, Health and Work.

The current holder is Sir Stephen Timms of the Labour Party.

== Current portfolio ==
The minister's responsibilities includes the following:

- Disability policy and x-Gov responsibility for disabled people
- Health and disability reform
- Universal Credit and Legacy Benefits Delivery
- Contributory Benefits, Personal Independence Payment (PIP), Disability Living Allowance (DLA), and Employment and Support Allowance (ESA)
- Carer’s Allowance (CA)
- Housing
- Access to Work
- ALB: Health and Safety Executive
- Serious Case Panel
- Uprating and Benefit Cap
- Oversight of Disability Unit (DU)

== List of ministers ==
Name	Portrait	Term of office		Party	Ministry
Parliamentary Under-Secretary of State for Disablement
Alf Morris		11 March 1974	4 May 1979	Labour	Wilson (III & IV); Callaghan
Minister of State for Social Security and the Disabled
Reginald Prentice		7 May 1979	5 January 1981	Conservative	Thatcher (I)
Hugh Rossi		5 January 1981	12 June 1983	Conservative	Thatcher (I)
Parliamentary Under-Secretary of State for the Disabled
Tony Newton		13 June 1983	11 September 1984	Conservative	Thatcher (II)
Minister of State for Social Security and the Disabled
Tony Newton		11 September 1984	10 September 1986	Conservative	Thatcher (II)
John Major		10 September 1986	13 June 1987	Conservative	Thatcher (II)
Minister of State for Social Security
Nicholas Scott		13 June 1987	20 July 1994	Conservative	Thatcher (III); Major (I & II)
Minister of State for Disabled People
William Hague		20 July 1994	5 July 1995	Conservative	Major (II)
Alistair Burt		6 July 1995	2 May 1997	Conservative	Major (II)
Parliamentary Under-Secretary of State for Disabled People
Paul Boateng		4 May 1997	27 October 1998	Labour	Blair (I) (II) (III)
Margaret Hodge		29 July 1998	11 June 2001	Labour	Blair (I) (II) (III)
Maria Eagle		11 June 2001	17 June 2005	Labour	Blair (I) (II) (III)
Anne McGuire		17 June 2005	5 October 2008	Labour	Blair (I) (II) (III)
Anne McGuire		17 June 2005	5 October 2008	Labour	Brown
Jonathan Shaw		5 October 2008	11 May 2010	Labour	Brown
Maria Miller		12 May 2010	4 September 2012	Conservative	Cameron-Clegg
Esther McVey		4 September 2012	7 October 2013	Conservative	Cameron-Clegg
Minister of State for Disabled People					
Mike Penning		7 October 2013	15 July 2014	Conservative	Cameron-Clegg
Mark Harper		15 July 2014	8 May 2015	Conservative	Cameron-Clegg
Parliamentary Under-Secretary of State for Disabled People
Justin Tomlinson		8 May 2015	15 July 2016	Conservative	Cameron (II)
Minister of State for Disabled People, Work and Health
Penny Mordaunt		15 July 2016	9 November 2017	Conservative	May (I) (II)
Sarah Newton		9 November 2017	13 March 2019	Conservative	May (I) (II)
Justin Tomlinson		4 April 2019	16 September 2021	Conservative	May (II); Johnson (I) (II)
Chloe Smith		16 September 2021	6 September 2022	Conservative	Johnson (II)
Parliamentary Under-Secretary of State for Disabled People, Health and Work
Claire Coutinho		21 September 2022	28 October 2022	Conservative	Truss; Sunak
Minister of State for Disabled People, Health and Work
Tom Pursglove		28 October 2022	7 December 2023	Conservative	Sunak
Parliamentary Under-Secretary of State for Disabled People, Health and Work
Mims Davies		14 December 2023	12 April 2024	Conservative	Sunak
Minister of State for Disabled People, Health and Work
Mims Davies		12 April 2024	5 July 2024	Conservative	Sunak
Minister of State for Social Security and Disability
Stephen Timms		8 July 2024	Incumbent	Labour	Starmer; Burnham

== See also ==
- Department of Health and Social Security 11 March 1974 to 25 July 1988
- Department of Social Security 25 July 1988 to
- Department for Work and Pensions 8 June 2001 to present
