= 1994 in British music =

This is a summary of 1994 in music in the United Kingdom, including the official charts from that year.

== Summary ==
The first number one single of the year was the 700th since charts began, a reggae version of "Twist and Shout" by Chaka Demus & Pliers. The next month saw Mariah Carey get her first solo UK number 1 with "Without You", after having 8 previous chart-toppers in the United States. Coincidentally, "Without You" did not top the US Billboard Hot 100.

In late May, Wet Wet Wet reached number 1 with "Love Is All Around", from the film Four Weddings and a Funeral. It would remain at number 1 for fifteen weeks, the second longest consecutive run at No. 1 ever in the UK Singles Chart, and become the biggest selling single of the year. When Danish singer Whigfield replaced it in September with "Saturday Night", she became the first ever act to enter the UK singles chart at No. 1 with their debut single.

Manchester rockers Oasis found their success on their debut album, Definitely Maybe, which shot to number No. 1 on its first week out in September.

December saw the debut of Boyzone to the charts, with a No. 2 cover of Johnny Bristol's "Love Me for a Reason" (also a 1974 No. 1 for The Osmonds). They would go on to have another fifteen singles, six reaching No. 1 and the rest reaching the top five, as well as four No. 1 albums.

Aside from Wet Wet Wet and Whigfield, the only other million selling single this year came from Céline Dion, with "Think Twice" (though it wouldn't reach number 1 until 1995). In all, 15 singles topped the chart this year, the second lowest number for any year in the decade.

1994 also saw a first for Prince, who scored his only British chart-topper with "The Most Beautiful Girl in the World".

This was the year when Karl Jenkins launched his crossover project, Adiemus, with the album, Adiemus: Songs of Sanctuary. Popularised through its use in TV commercials, the title track became known to classical and popular music fans alike. It also made the name of vocalist Miriam Stockley.

Another British composer, Stephen Warbeck, won the Drama Desk Award for Outstanding Music in a Play, awarded for achievements in Broadway theatre; the award was made for his music for a production of An Inspector Calls.

A record was broken in 1994 for the longest song to become a UK top 10 hit when Bon Jovi released the single "Dry County" in March, when it peaked at #9. The song was 9 minutes and 52 seconds long.

== Events ==
- 11 February – Living Toys, a piece for chamber ensemble by Thomas Adès, is performed for the first time in the Barbican Centre.
- 17 February – Members of then unknown band Oasis are deported from Amsterdam for starting a drunken brawl with football fans on a ferry. All but Noel Gallagher (who wasn't present in the incident) are arrested and deported, and the incident would be referenced in an interview between Liam and Noel that was later released on the "Wibbling Rivalry" single.
- 12 March – ...but all shall be well for orchestra by Thomas Adès is performed for the first time, in Ely Cathedral, Cambridge.
- 15 March – The first performance of Chat Moss for orchestra by Peter Maxwell Davies takes place in Liverpool, performed by the orchestra of St. Edward’s College, conducted by John Moseley.
- 11 April – Oasis release their debut single "Supersonic", it reaches No. 31 on the Official Singles Chart but would eventually sell over 215,000 copies and would later become their 13th best selling single of all time.
- 9 May – Wet Wet Wet release their cover of "Love Is All Around" as a single, it would chart at No. 4, before rising to No. 2 and then spent 15 weeks at No. 1 on the Official Charts.
- 6 July – Oasis are banned for life from Columbia Hotel, London, after trashing the bar and rooms there, as well as throwing furniture from their room which lands on the car of the hotel's manager.
- 8 July – Bernard Butler leaves Suede, during the recording of their 2nd album Dog Man Star due to tensions with Brett Anderson. Butler would be replaced by Richard Oakes.
- 9 August – A riot breaks out at an Oasis gig at Newcastle's Riverside after an audience member punches Noel Gallagher, resulting in him damaging a guitar that was given to him by Johnny Marr. Noel would require stitches as a result of the attack.
- 14 August – The Apocalypse by John Tavener for chorus and orchestra is performed for the first time at the Proms in London.
- 23 August – The KLF burn one million pounds sterling of their own royalties in a disused boathouse on the Ardfin Estate on the Scottish island of Jura. Bill Drummond was initially unrepentant about the decision, but in 2004 later admitted that he regretted burning the money.
- 29 August – Oasis release their debut album Definitely Maybe, it sells 100,000 copies within just 4 days of release and earned them the record for fastest selling debut album in British history.
- 6 September – Wet Wet Wet delete their "Love Is All Around" single, after 15 weeks at No. 1, admitting at the time that they were "sick of it" and that they wanted to concentrate on new material. The single drops to No. 2, and as a result, they fall short of tieing with Bryan Adams' record of 16 consecutive weeks at No. 1.
- 21 September – The ten-minute orchestral fantasy Britannia by James MacMillan, based on patriotic themes, is performed for the first time at the Barbican by the London Symphony Orchestra, conductor Michael Tilson Thomas.
- 29 October – Pink Floyd finish what would be their final tour, at Earls Court, in support of their The Division Bell album. This would be the last time the 3 members would perform together until a one-off reunion with Roger Waters at Live 8 in 2005.
- 16 November – Arcadiana for string quartet by Thomas Adès is performed for the first time, in West Road Concert Hall, Cambridge.
- 24 November – The Spanish Lady, an opera by Edward Elgar, is performed for the first time, in West Road Concert Hall, Cambridge 61 years after it was composed.
- 2 December – Andrew Lloyd Webber is admitted to hospital for ulcer treatment.
- 21 December – Richey Edwards gives what would be his final live appearance with the Manic Street Preachers at the London Astoria. The concert ends with the band smashing their equipment.

== Charts ==
=== Number-one singles ===
Chart date (week ending)	Song	Artist(s)	Sales
1 January	"Mr. Blobby"	Mr Blobby	124,000
8 January	"Twist and Shout"	Chaka Demus & Pliers featuring Jack Radics & Taxi Gang	70,000
15 January	"Twist and Shout"	Chaka Demus & Pliers featuring Jack Radics & Taxi Gang	66,000
22 January	"Things Can Only Get Better"	D:Ream	67,000
29 January	"Things Can Only Get Better"	D:Ream	69,000
5 February	"Things Can Only Get Better"	D:Ream	81,000
12 February	"Things Can Only Get Better"	D:Ream	61,000
19 February	"Without You"	Mariah Carey	76,000
26 February	"Without You"	Mariah Carey	109,000
5 March	"Without You"	Mariah Carey	96,000
12 March	"Without You"	Mariah Carey	77,000
19 March	"Doop"	Doop	89,000
26 March	"Doop"	Doop	118,000
2 April	"Doop"	Doop	84,000
9 April	"Everything Changes"	Take That	129,000
16 April	"Everything Changes"	Take That	105,000
23 April	"The Most Beautiful Girl in the World"	Prince	60,000
30 April	"The Most Beautiful Girl in the World"	Prince	52,000
7 May	"The Real Thing"	Tony Di Bart	47,000
14 May	"Inside"	Stiltskin	61,000
21 May	"Come on You Reds"	Manchester United Football Squad	77,000
28 May	"Come on You Reds"	Manchester United Football Squad	84,000
4 June	"Love Is All Around"	Wet Wet Wet	87,000
11 June	"Love Is All Around"	Wet Wet Wet	104,000
18 June	"Love Is All Around"	Wet Wet Wet	115,000
25 June	"Love Is All Around"	Wet Wet Wet	113,000
2 July	"Love Is All Around"	Wet Wet Wet	100,000
9 July	"Love Is All Around"	Wet Wet Wet	100,000
16 July	"Love Is All Around"	Wet Wet Wet	98,000
23 July	"Love Is All Around"	Wet Wet Wet	85,000
30 July	"Love Is All Around"	Wet Wet Wet	85,000
6 August	"Love Is All Around"	Wet Wet Wet	88,000
13 August	"Love Is All Around"	Wet Wet Wet	83,000
20 August	"Love Is All Around"	Wet Wet Wet	89,000
27 August	"Love Is All Around"	Wet Wet Wet	82,000
3 September	"Love Is All Around"	Wet Wet Wet	77,000
10 September	"Love Is All Around"	Wet Wet Wet	65,000
17 September	"Saturday Night"	Whigfield	149,000
24 September	"Saturday Night"	Whigfield	220,000
1 October	"Saturday Night"	Whigfield	176,000
8 October	"Saturday Night"	Whigfield	140,000
15 October	"Sure"	Take That	115,000
22 October	"Sure"	Take That	81,000
29 October	"Baby Come Back"	Pato Banton	71,500
5 November	"Baby Come Back"	Pato Banton	113,000
12 November	"Baby Come Back"	Pato Banton	94,000
19 November	"Baby Come Back"	Pato Banton	77,000
26 November	"Let Me Be Your Fantasy"	Baby D	75,000
3 December	"Let Me Be Your Fantasy"	Baby D	84,000
10 December	"Stay Another Day"	East 17	97,000
17 December	"Stay Another Day"	East 17	174,000
24 December	"Stay Another Day"	East 17	171,000
31 December	"Stay Another Day"	East 17	204,000

=== Number-one albums ===
Chart date (week ending)	Album	Artist
1 January	Bat Out of Hell II: Back into Hell	Meat Loaf
8 January	Everything Changes	Take That
15 January	So Far So Good	Bryan Adams
22 January	One Woman: The Ultimate Collection	Diana Ross
29 January	Tease Me	Chaka Demus & Pliers
5 February	Tease Me	Chaka Demus & Pliers
12 February	Under the Pink	Tori Amos
19 February	The Cross of Changes	Enigma
26 February	Music Box	Mariah Carey
5 March	Music Box	Mariah Carey
12 March	Music Box	Mariah Carey
19 March	Music Box	Mariah Carey
26 March	Vauxhall and I	Morrissey
2 April	Music Box	Mariah Carey
9 April	The Division Bell	Pink Floyd
16 April	The Division Bell	Pink Floyd
23 April	The Division Bell	Pink Floyd
30 April	The Division Bell	Pink Floyd
7 May	Parklife	Blur
14 May	Our Town – The Greatest Hits	Deacon Blue
21 May	Our Town – The Greatest Hits	Deacon Blue
28 May	I Say I Say I Say	Erasure
4 June	Seal	Seal
11 June	Seal	Seal
18 June	Real Things	2 Unlimited
25 June	Everybody Else Is Doing It, So Why Can't We?	The Cranberries
2 July	Happy Nation	Ace of Base
9 July	Happy Nation	Ace of Base
16 July	Music for the Jilted Generation	The Prodigy
23 July	Voodoo Lounge	The Rolling Stones
30 July	End of Part One: Their Greatest Hits	Wet Wet Wet
6 August	End of Part One: Their Greatest Hits	Wet Wet Wet
13 August	End of Part One: Their Greatest Hits	Wet Wet Wet
20 August	End of Part One: Their Greatest Hits	Wet Wet Wet
27 August	Come	Prince
3 September	End of Part One: Their Greatest Hits	Wet Wet Wet
10 September	Definitely Maybe	Oasis
17 September	The Three Tenors in Concert 1994	José Carreras, Plácido Domingo & Luciano Pavarotti with Orchestra Conducted by Zubin Mehta
24 September	From the Cradle	Eric Clapton
1 October	Songs	Luther Vandross
8 October	Monster	R.E.M.
15 October	Monster	R.E.M.
22 October	Cross Road	Bon Jovi
29 October	Cross Road	Bon Jovi
5 November	Cross Road	Bon Jovi
12 November	MTV Unplugged in New York	Nirvana
19 November	Cross Road	Bon Jovi
26 November	Cross Road	Bon Jovi
3 December	Carry on up the Charts	The Beautiful South
10 December	Live at the BBC	The Beatles
17 December	Carry on up the Charts	The Beautiful South
24 December	Carry on up the Charts	The Beautiful South
31 December	Carry on up the Charts	The Beautiful South

=== Number-one compilation albums ===
Chart date (week ending)	Album
12 February	Sweet Soul Harmonies
19 February	Dance Hits '94 Volume 1
26 February	Dance Hits '94 Volume 1
5 March	Dance Hits '94 Volume 1
12 March	Soul Devotion
19 March	Soul Devotion
26 March	Soul Devotion
2 April	Soul Devotion
9 April	Now 27
16 April	Now 27
23 April	Now 27
30 April	Now 27
7 May	Dance Zone Level One
14 May	Dance Zone Level One
21 May	Dance Zone Level One
28 May	Dance Zone Level One
4 June	Energy Rush – Xtermin8
11 June	Dance Hits '94 Volume 2
18 June	Pure Moods
25 June	Pure Moods
2 July	Now Dance Summer 94
9 July	Now Dance Summer 94
16 July	Dance Zone Level 2
23 July	Dance Zone Level 2
30 July	It's the Ultimate Dance Album
6 August	It's the Ultimate Dance Album
13 August	Now 28
20 August	Now 28
27 August	Now 28
3 September	Now 28
10 September	Now 28
17 September	The Best Rock Album in the World...Ever!
24 September	The Best Rock Album in the World...Ever!
1 October	The Best Rock Album in the World...Ever!
8 October	Dance Zone Level 3
15 October	Now 1994
22 October	Now 1994
29 October	Now 1994
5 November	Now 1994
12 November	The Best Rock Album in the World...Ever!
19 November	The Love Album
26 November	Now 29
3 December	Now 29
10 December	Now 29
17 December	Now 29
24 December	Now 29
31 December	Now 29

== Year-end charts ==
=== Best-selling singles ===
No.	Title	Artist	Peak position
1	"Love Is All Around"	Wet Wet Wet	1
2	"Saturday Night"	Whigfield	1
3	"Stay Another Day"	East 17	1
4	"Baby Come Back"	Pato Banton featuring Ali and Robin Campbell of UB40	1
5	"I Swear"	All-4-One	2
6	"Without You"	Mariah Carey	1
7	"Always"	Bon Jovi	2
8	"Crazy for You"	Let Loose	2
9	"Things Can Only Get Better" (D:Reamix)	D:Ream	1
10	"Doop"	Doop	1
11	"The Sign"	Ace of Base	2
12	"Come On You Reds"	The Manchester United Football Squad	1
13	"The Rhythm of the Night" (Rapino Brothers Radio Version)	Corona	2
14	"All I Want for Christmas Is You"	Mariah Carey	2
15	"I Like to Move It"	Reel 2 Real featuring The Mad Stuntman	5
16	"7 Seconds"	Youssou N'Dour and Neneh Cherry	3
17	"Swamp Thing"	The Grid	3
18	"Let Me Be Your Fantasy"	Baby D	1
19	"Love Me for a Reason"	Boyzone	3 (Note: Reached number 2 in 1995)
20	"Everything Changes"	Take That	1
21	"(Meet) The Flintstones"	The BC-52's	3
22	"Streets of Philadelphia"	Bruce Springsteen	2
23	"Inside"	Stiltskin	1
24	"The Most Beautiful Girl in the World"	Prince	1
25	"Searching"	China Black	4
26	"Crocodile Shoes"	Jimmy Nail	4
27	"Compliments on Your Kiss"	Red Dragon with Brian and Tony Gold	2
28	"Return to Innocence"	Enigma	3
29	"We Have All the Time in the World"	Louis Armstrong	3
30	"Baby, I Love Your Way"	Big Mountain	2
31	"Another Night"	(MC Sar &) The Real McCoy	2
32	"The Real Thing"	Tony Di Bart	1
33	"Breathe Again"	Toni Braxton	2
34	"Think Twice"	Celine Dion	5 (Note: Reached number 1 in 1995)
35	"Regulate"	Warren G and Nate Dogg	5
36	"Sweetness"	Michelle Gayle	4
37	"All for Love"	Bryan Adams/Rod Stewart/Sting	2
38	"Hey Now (Girls Just Want to Have Fun)"	Cyndi Lauper	4
39	"Around the World"	East 17	3
40	"Stay (I Missed You)"	Lisa Loeb and Nine Stories	6
41	"Sweets for My Sweet"	C.J. Lewis	3
42	"Sure"	Take That	1
43	"I'll Make Love to You"	Boyz II Men	5
44	"Endless Love"	Luther Vandross and Mariah Carey	3
45	"Cotton Eye Joe"	Rednex	5 (Note: Reached number 1 in 1995)
46	"Power Rangers"	The Mighty Morph'n Power Rangers	3
47	"Shine"	Aswad	5
48	"Mmm Mmm Mmm Mmm"	Crash Test Dummies	2
49	"No Good (Start the Dance)"	The Prodigy	4
50	"Get-A-Way"	Maxx	4

=== Best-selling albums ===
No.	Title	Artist	Peak position
1	Cross Road: The Best of Bon Jovi	Bon Jovi	1
2	Carry On up the Charts: The Best of the Beautiful South	The Beautiful South	1
3	Music Box	Mariah Carey	1
4	Always & Forever	Eternal	3 (Note: Reached number 2 in 1995)
5	The Division Bell	Pink Floyd	1
6	End of Part One: Their Greatest Hits	Wet Wet Wet	1
7	Monster	R.E.M.	1
8	Parklife	Blur	1
9	Live at the BBC	The Beatles	1
10	Steam	East 17	3
11	The Three Tenors in Concert 1994	José Carreras, Plácido Domingo and Luciano Pavarotti, orchestra conducted by Zubin Mehta	1
12	Crocodile Shoes	Jimmy Nail	2
13	Fields of Gold: The Best of Sting 1984–1994	Sting	2
14	The Cross of Changes	Enigma	1
15	The Hit List	Cliff Richard	3
16	12 Deadly Cyns... and Then Some	Cyndi Lauper	2
17	Everybody Else Is Doing It, So Why Can't We?	The Cranberries	1
18	Our Town – The Greatest Hits	Deacon Blue	1
19	Happy Nation	Ace of Base	1
20	Elegant Slumming	M People	4 (Note: Reached number 2 in 1993)
21	Definitely Maybe	Oasis	1
22	Everything Changes	Take That	1
23	One Woman: The Ultimate Collection	Diana Ross	1
24	Bedtime Stories	Madonna	2
25	Bizarre Fruit	M People	4 (Note: Reached number 3 in 1996 as the reissued Bizarre Fruit II)
26	Crazy	Julio Iglesias	6
27	Labour of Love Volumes I and II	UB40	5
28	Music for the Jilted Generation	The Prodigy	1
29	The Greatest Hits	INXS	3
30	Debut	Björk	3
31	MTV Unplugged in New York	Nirvana	1
32	The Essential Collection	Elvis Presley	6
33	The Best of Chris Rea	Chris Rea	3
34	No Need to Argue	The Cranberries	2
35	Brother Sister	The Brand New Heavies	4
36	Songs	Luther Vandross	1
37	Seal	Seal	1
38	Bat Out of Hell II: Back into Hell	Meat Loaf	4 (Note: Reached number 1 in 1993)
39	(the best of) New Order	New Order	4
40	The Best of Sade	Sade	6
41	Hold Me, Thrill Me, Kiss Me	Gloria Estefan	5
42	So Close	Dina Carroll	2
43	D:Ream On Vol. 1	D:Ream	5
44	Big Ones	Aerosmith	7
45	So Far So Good	Bryan Adams	1
46	Psyche – The Album	PJ & Duncan	14 (Note: Reached number 5 in 1995)
47	Tease Me	Chaka Demus & Pliers	1
48	Under the Pink	Tori Amos	1
49	Toni Braxton	Toni Braxton	4
50	God Shuffled His Feet	Crash Test Dummies	2

=== Best-selling compilation albums ===
No.	Title	Peak position
1	Now 29	1
2	Now 28	1
3	The Best Rock Album in the World... Ever!	1
4	The Love Album	1
5	Pure Moods	1
6	Now 27	1
7	Now That's What I Call Music! 1994	1
8	Dance Zone '94	2
9	The Very Best of Andrew Lloyd Webber	3
10	Four Weddings and a Funeral Original Soundtrack	5

== Classical music: new works ==
- Thomas Adès – Living Toys
- Peter Maxwell Davies – Symphony No. 5
- Graham Fitkin – Length
- Jonathan Harvey – One Evening...
- Alun Hoddinott – The Silver Swimmer, Op. 152/1 – for soprano and ensemble
- Michael Nyman – MGV
- John Rutter – "I will sing with the spirit"

== Opera ==
- Harrison Birtwistle – The Second Mrs Kong
- Andy Vores – Freshwater
- Judith Weir – Blond Eckbert

== Film and incidental music ==
- Richard Rodney Bennett – Four Weddings and a Funeral.
- Howard Goodall – The Vicar of Dibley (setting of Psalm 23)

== Musical films ==
- Backbeat
- Brave

== Music awards ==
=== Brit Awards ===
The 1994 Brit Awards winners were:

- Best soundtrack: "The Bodyguard"
- Best British producer: Brian Eno
- Best selling album & Single: Meat Loaf
- British album: Stereo MC's – "Connected"
- British breakthrough act: Gabrielle
- British dance act: M People
- British female solo artist: Dina Carroll
- British group: Stereo MC's
- British male solo artist: Sting
- British single: Take That – "Pray"
- British video: Take That – "Pray"
- International breakthrough act: Björk
- International female: Björk
- International group: Crowded House
- International male: Lenny Kravitz
- Outstanding contribution: Van Morrison

=== Mercury Music Prize ===
The 1994 Mercury Music Prize was awarded to M People – Elegant Slumming.

== Births ==
- 1 February – Harry Styles, singer (One Direction)
- 1 April – Ella Eyre, English singer-songwriter
- 5 May – Celeste, American-born singer
- 2 August – Jacob Collier, jazz pianist and singer
- October – Grace-Evangeline Mason, composer
- 23 September – Andrew Johnston, boy soprano
- 24 November – Reece Mastin, English-Australian singer-songwriter

== Deaths ==
- 6 February – Norman Del Mar, conductor, horn player, and music writer, 74
- 1 March – Tim Souster, songwriter and composer of electronic music, 51
- 23 March – Donald Swann, pianist, composer and comedy entertainer, 70
- 7 April – Lee Brilleaux, vocalist with Dr. Feelgood, 41 (lymphoma)
- 23 May – Ronald Hanmer, conductor, composer and arranger, 77
- 14 June – Lionel Grigson, jazz pianist, cornettist, trumpeter, composer and teacher, 52
- 26 June – Thomas Armstrong, organist, conductor, composer, educationalist and adjudicator, 96
- 29 July – William Mathias, composer, 57
- 31 July – Anne Shelton, British singer, 70
- 15 August – Syd Dale, composer, 70
- 2 September – Roy Castle, musician and all-round entertainer, 62 (lung cancer)
- 6 September – Nicky Hopkins, pianist and organist, 50 (complications from intestinal surgery)
- 7 September – Eric Crozier, librettist, 79
- 20 September – Jule Styne, English-born American songwriter, 88
- 22 September – Leonard Feather, jazz pianist, composer, producer and music journalist, 80
- 11 November – Elizabeth Maconchy, composer, 87

== See also ==
- 1994 in British radio
- 1994 in British television
- 1994 in the United Kingdom
- List of British films of 1994
