= Stephen Timms =

British politician (born 1955)

The Right Honourable Sir Stephen Timms MP
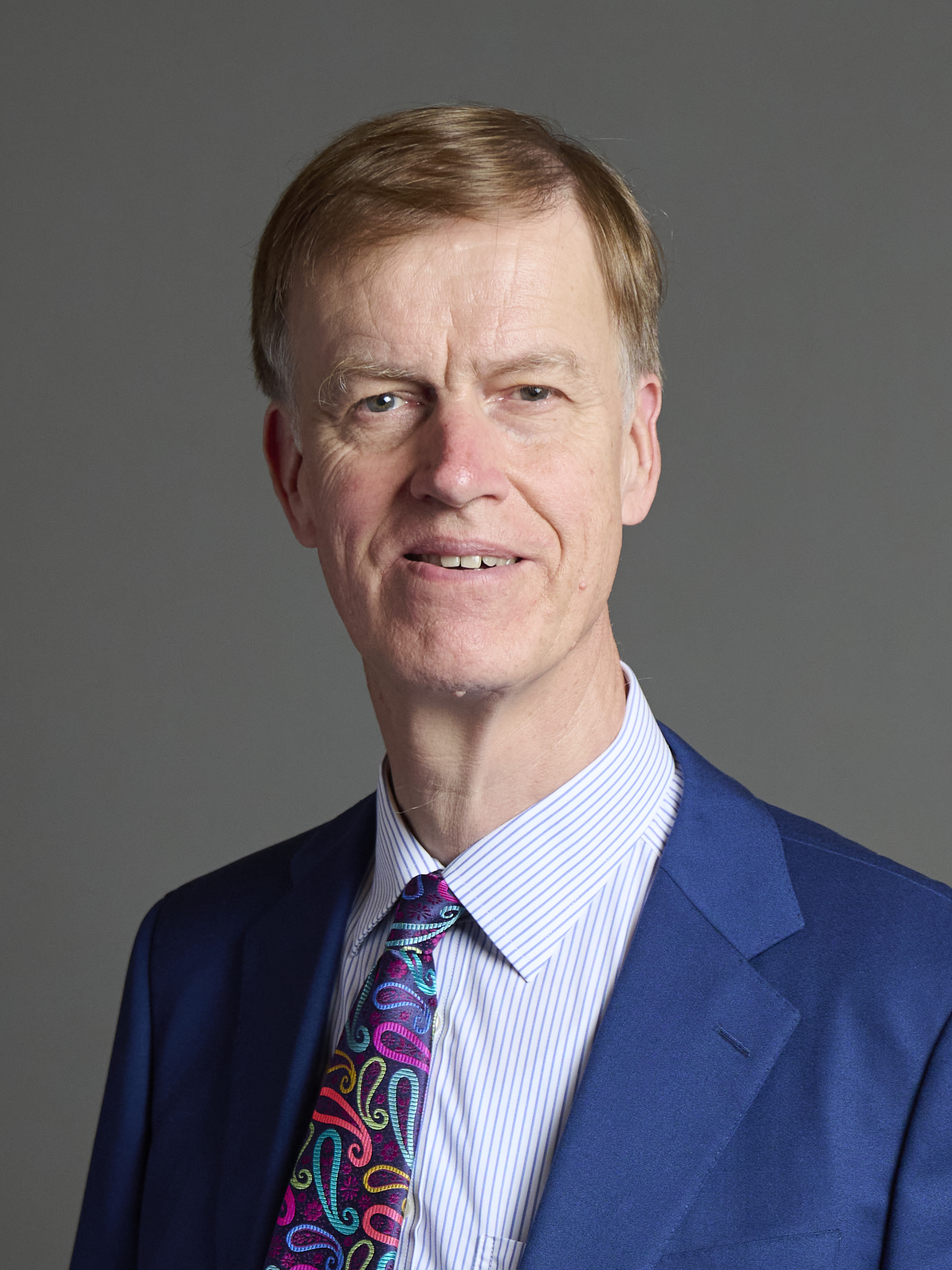
- Official portrait, 2024

Minister of State for Equalities
- Incumbent
- Assumed office 20 July 2026
- Prime Minister: Andy Burnham
- Preceded by: The Baroness Smith of Malvern

Minister of State for Social Security and Disability
- Incumbent
- Assumed office 8 July 2024
- Prime Minister: Keir Starmer; Andy Burnham
- Preceded by: Mims Davies

Chief Secretary to the Treasury
- In office 5 May 2006 – 28 June 2007
- Chancellor: Gordon Brown
- Preceded by: Des Browne
- Succeeded by: Andy Burnham
Shadow portfolios
Shadow Secretary of State for Work and Pensions
Acting; 8 June 2015 – 13 September 2015
Leader	Harriet Harman (Acting)
Preceded by	Rachel Reeves
Succeeded by	Owen Smith
Shadow Minister for Employment
In office 8 October 2010 – 13 September 2015
Leader	Ed Miliband; Harriet Harman (Acting)
Preceded by	Jim Knight
Succeeded by	Emily Thornberry
Shadow Financial Secretary to the Treasury
In office 12 May 2010 – 8 October 2010
Leader	Harriet Harman (Acting)
Preceded by	Mark Hoban
Succeeded by	Chris Leslie
Junior ministerial offices
Parliamentary Under-Secretary of State for Digital Britain
In office 6 August 2009 – 11 May 2010
Prime Minister	Gordon Brown
Preceded by	Position established
Succeeded by	Position abolished
Financial Secretary to the Treasury
In office 5 October 2008 – 11 May 2010
Prime Minister	Gordon Brown
Preceded by	Jane Kennedy
Succeeded by	Mark Hoban
In office 12 September 2004 – 6 May 2005
Prime Minister	Tony Blair
Preceded by	Ruth Kelly
Succeeded by	John Healey
In office 29 July 1999 – 8 June 2001
Prime Minister	Tony Blair
Preceded by	Barbara Roche
Succeeded by	Paul Boateng
Minister of State for Employment and Welfare Reform
In office 25 January 2008 – 3 October 2008
Prime Minister	Gordon Brown
Preceded by	Caroline Flint
Succeeded by	Tony McNulty
Minister of State for Competitiveness (Note: e-Commerce and Competitiveness (2002–04))
In office 2 July 2007 – 25 January 2008
Prime Minister	Gordon Brown
Preceded by	Position re-established
Succeeded by	The Baroness Vadera
In office 29 May 2002 – 9 September 2004
Prime Minister	Tony Blair
Preceded by	Douglas Alexander
Succeeded by	Position abolished
Minister of State for Pensions
In office 6 May 2005 – 5 May 2006
Prime Minister	Tony Blair
Preceded by	Malcolm Wicks
Succeeded by	James Purnell
In office 23 December 1998 – 29 July 1999
Prime Minister	Tony Blair
Preceded by	John Denham
Succeeded by	Jeff Rooker
Minister of State for Schools
In office 11 June 2001 – 24 October 2002
Prime Minister	Tony Blair
Preceded by	Estelle Morris
Succeeded by	David Miliband

Chair of the Work and Pensions Select Committee
- In office 29 January 2020 – 30 May 2024
- Preceded by: Frank Field
- Succeeded by: Debbie Abrahams

Member of Parliament for East Ham Newham North East (1994–1997)
- Incumbent
- Assumed office 9 June 1994
- Preceded by: Ron Leighton
- Majority: 12,863 (33.9%)

Personal details
- Born: Stephen Creswell Timms; 29 July 1955 (age 71) Oldham, Lancashire, England
- Party: Labour
- Spouse: Hui-Leng Lim (m. 1986)
- Education: Emmanuel College, Cambridge (BA)
- Website: www.stephentimms.org.uk

Sir Stephen Creswell Timms (born 29 July 1955) is a British politician who has been the Member of Parliament (MP) for East Ham, formerly Newham North East, since 1994. A member of the Labour Party, he has served as Minister of State for Social Security and Disability since July 2024.

Timms served in the New Labour governments of Tony Blair and Gordon Brown under several portfolios. He served for three periods as Financial Secretary to the Treasury; from 1999 to 2001, 2004 to 2005, and 2008 to 2010. As Chief Secretary to the Treasury, Timms attended Cabinet from 2006 to 2007.

In May 2010, Timms survived an attempted murder by Islamist terrorist Roshonara Choudhry who stabbed him twice in the abdomen at his constituency surgery. Choudhry was convicted of attempted murder and sentenced to life imprisonment.

Timms served on the Official Opposition frontbench as Shadow Minister for Employment, and later served in the Shadow cabinet as Shadow Secretary of State for Work and Pensions. He returned to the backbenches in September 2015.

== Early life and career ==
Stephen Timms was born on 29 July 1955 in Oldham, Lancashire, to Ronald James Timms, an engineer, and Margaret Joyce Timms, a teacher. He was educated at Farnborough Grammar School in Farnborough, Hampshire, before studying mathematics at Emmanuel College, Cambridge, where he gained a degree in mathematics in 1977 and an MPhil in operational research in 1978.

Before entering politics, Timms worked in the telecommunications industry for 15 years, first for Logica from 1978 to 1986, and then for Ovum from 1986 to 1994, where he worked as a manager responsible for producing reports on the future of telecommunications. He was elected as a councillor for the Little Ilford Ward on Newham London Borough Council in a by-election in 1984, and served as Leader of the Council from 1990 to 1994.

== Parliamentary career ==
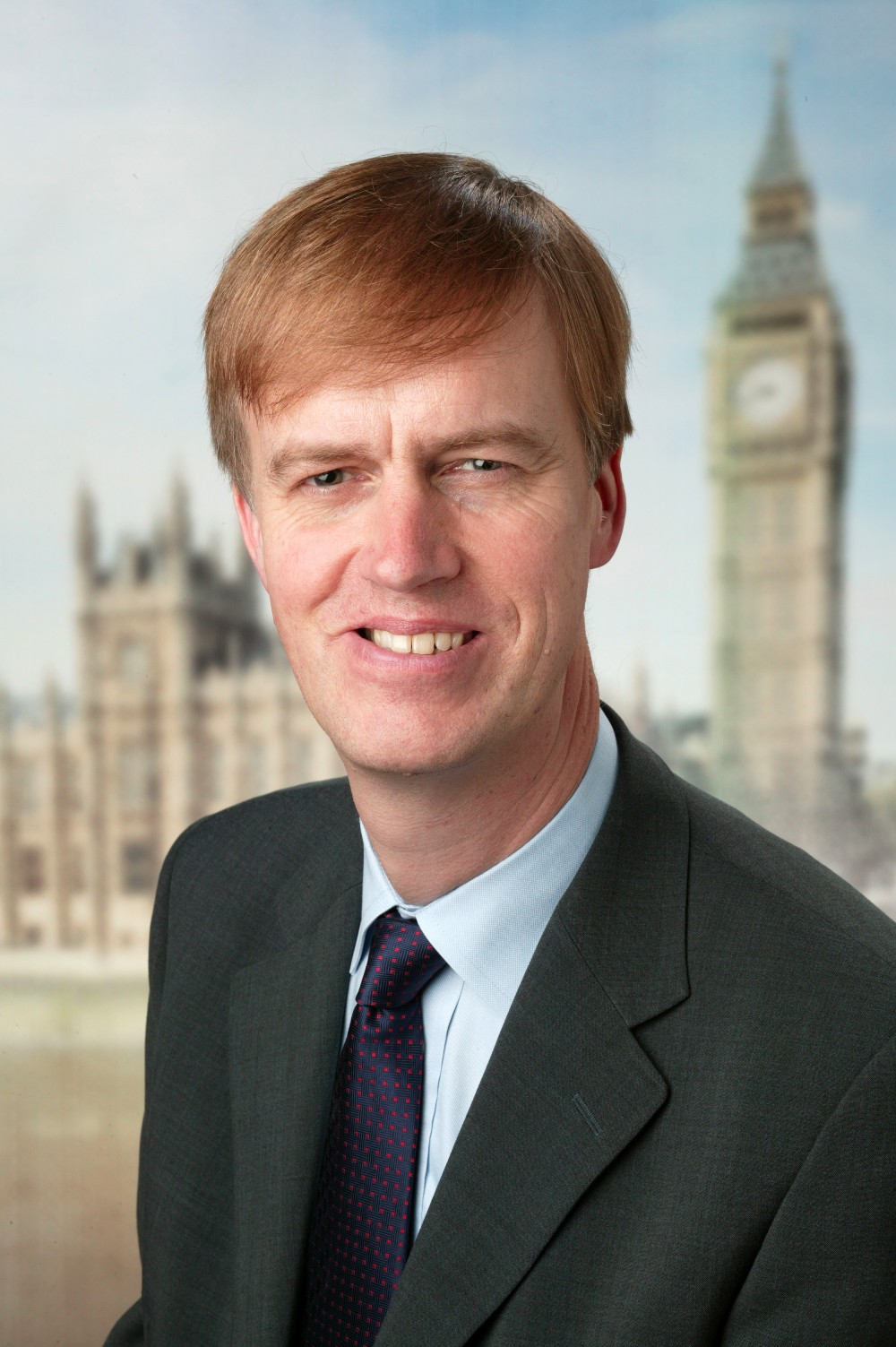
Timms in 2007

At the 1994 Newham North East by-election, Timms was elected to Parliament as MP for Newham North East with 75% of the vote and a majority of 11,838.

Prior to the 1997 general election, Timms' constituency of Newham North East was abolished, and replaced with East Ham. At the election, Timms was elected to Parliament as MP for East Ham with 64.6% of the vote and a majority of 19,358.

Timms served as Parliamentary Private Secretary to Andrew Smith from May 1997 to March 1998, and later to Mo Mowlam from March to July 1998.

In 1998, Timms was appointed Parliamentary Under-Secretary of State at the Department of Social Security, rising to Minister of State in that department in 1999.

At the 2001 general election, Timms was re-elected as MP for East Ham with an increased vote share of 73.1% and an increased majority of 21,032. He was again re-elected at the 2005 general election, with a decreased vote share of 53.9% and a decreased majority of 13,155.

In May 2006, Timms was promoted to the Cabinet as Chief Secretary to the Treasury, a post in which he remained until 28 June 2007, when he was removed from the cabinet by new prime minister Gordon Brown. It was later announced that he had been appointed Minister of State for Competitiveness at the newly created Department for Business, Enterprise and Regulatory Reform.

Following a government reshuffle on 24 January 2008, Timms moved to the Department for Work and Pensions, and became Minister for Employment and Welfare Reform. On 3 October 2008, Timms returned to his former role as Financial Secretary to the Treasury.

In August 2009, Timms was given additional responsibility for Digital Britain. In September 2009, he announced plans for a tax of £6 per year to be levied on each phone account in the UK. At the time, this was characterised as a stealth tax in the media. In April 2010, Timms' department made an embarrassing slip when a letter purporting to be from him mistakenly identified IP address as "intellectual property address". According to the accountants' magazine Accountancy Age, he was highly regarded by finance professionals despite such gaffes.

At the 2010 general election, Timms was again re-elected, with an increased vote share of 70.4% and an increased majority of 27,826.

In February 2013 Timms abstained on the second reading of the Marriage (Same Sex Couples) Act 2013. Subsequently, in May 2013 he voted against the bill's third and final reading, opposing the legalisation of same-sex marriage within England and Wales.

Timms was again re-elected at the 2015 general election with an increased vote share of 77.6% and an increased majority of 34,252.

Following the 2015 Labour leadership election, he was offered a junior shadow Treasury position by new leader Jeremy Corbyn but chose to turn it down and return to the backbenches.

Timms supported Owen Smith in the failed attempt to replace Jeremy Corbyn in the 2016 Labour leadership election.

At the snap 2017 general election, Timms was again re-elected with an increased vote share of 83.2% and an increased majority of 39,883. He was again re-elected at the 2019 general election, with a decreased vote share of 76.3% and a decreased majority of 33,176. He chaired the Work and Pensions Select Committee from 2020 to 2024.

In April 2021, Timms praised the work of the controversial Jesus House Church on Twitter. His tweet came after an official apology from Labour leader Keir Starmer, who had admitted it had been a "mistake" to film a promotional video at the church when it had come to light that the pastor of the church, Agu Irukwu, had previously opposed same sex marriage and equality legislation. LGBT+ Labour said they were "disappointed" to see Timms' tweet so soon after Starmer's apology, after Timms was criticised for supporting the "anti-LGBTQ+" church.

On 23 August 2021, Prime Minister Boris Johnson appointed Timms as the UK's trade envoy to Switzerland and Liechtenstein.

Timms was knighted in the 2022 Birthday Honours for political and public service.

At the 2024 general election, Timms was again re-elected with a decreased vote share of 51.6% and a decreased majority of 12,863. Timms was appointed to the Starmer ministry as Minister of State for Social Security and Disability. In July 2026, he was reappointed to the new government as Minister of State in the Department for Work and Pensions by Andy Burnham.

Timms is a member of Labour Friends of Israel.

== Murder attempt ==
On 14 May 2010, Timms was approached by 21-year-old female Islamist extremist Roshonara Choudhry, during a constituency surgery at the Beckton Globe Library in Kingsford Way in Beckton. Choudhry stabbed Timms twice in the abdomen with a 15 cm (6-inch) kitchen knife, before being disarmed. She stated that she had been influenced by watching sermons of Anwar al-Awlaki, a leader of al-Qaeda in the Arabian Peninsula, and that her attack was to punish Timms for voting for the Iraq War, and seek revenge for the Iraqi people.

He suffered "potentially life-threatening" wounds, including lacerations to his liver and a perforation to his stomach. Timms underwent emergency surgery at the Royal London Hospital, from which he was discharged on 19 May.

On 2 November 2010, Choudhry was found guilty of Timms' attempted murder. She was subsequently sentenced to life imprisonment with a minimum term of 15 years. After the court case, Timms said he was not bitter, but that forgiveness was not possible because his attacker showed no remorse. He has since sought the banning of incendiary material on popular internet sites "to protect other vulnerable young people from going down the same road." YouTube removed some videos of al-Awlaki within hours of the sentence.

Following the 2021 murder of David Amess, Timms said in parliament that he would like to meet Choudhry, so "he can finally forgive her".

== Personal life ==
Timms is an evangelical Christian. He is passionate about Christians entering politics and is a keen supporter of Just Love, a social justice movement working with Christian students. He has lived in the London Borough of Newham since 1979, and has been married to Hui-Leng Lim since 1986.

== Notes ==
Parliament of the United Kingdom
Preceded by Ron Leighton	Member of Parliament for Newham North East; 1994–1997	Constituency abolished
New constituency	Member of Parliament for East Ham; 1997–present	Incumbent
Political offices
Preceded by Barbara Roche	Financial Secretary to the Treasury; 1999–2001	Succeeded by Paul Boateng
Preceded by Estelle Morris	Minister of State for Schools; 2001–2002	Succeeded by David Miliband
Preceded by Ruth Kelly	Financial Secretary to the Treasury; 2004–2005	Succeeded by John Healey
Preceded by Des Browne	Chief Secretary to the Treasury; 2006–2007	Succeeded by Andy Burnham
Preceded by Jane Kennedy	Financial Secretary to the Treasury; 2008–2010	Succeeded by Mark Hoban
Preceded by Rachel Reeves	Shadow Secretary of State for Work and Pensions; Acting; 2015	Succeeded by Owen Smith
