= Ruth Adler =

British feminist, human rights campaigner and child welfare advocate (1944–1994)

- Born: 1 October 1944; Devon, England, United Kingdom
- Died: 18 February 1994 (aged 49); Edinburgh, Scotland, United Kingdom
- Education: North London Collegiate School; Somerville College, Oxford; University of London; University of Edinburgh
- Known for: Child welfare campaigner, human rights campaigner, feminist
- Children: Jonathan, Benjamin

Ruth Margaret Adler née Oppenheimer (1 October 1944 – 18 February 1994) was a feminist, human rights campaigner and child welfare advocate. She was founder of Amnesty International's Scotland office as their first employee in Scotland in 1991. She was a founding member of Scottish Women's Aid in 1974, a member of the Lothian Region Children's Panel and she helped to establish the Scottish Child Law Centre.

== Life ==
Ruth's parents Charlotte and Rudolf Oppenheimer came from Germany to Britain as refugees in the 1930s. Ruth was born in Devon, where her father was stationed during the war.

Her education began at North London Collegiate School. She studied Philosophy, Politics and Economics at Somerville College, Oxford and an MA in philosophy at University of London. She moved to Scotland in the 1960s with her husband and children and became a part-time tutor in the Philosophy Department of Edinburgh University for many years before gaining a further PhD in Law presenting the thesis, "Rights, interests and reasoning in juvenile justice". She was influenced by her supervisor Neil MacCormick. Adler was bilingual in English and German and, after obtaining her PhD, she and MacCormick collaborated in translating a number of books by leading Czech (Ota Weinberger) and German (Robert Alexy, Guenter Teubner) legal philosophers from German into English.

While working at The Scottish Child Law Centre she helped to create the first comprehensive database of child law in Scotland. She was a magistrate and a Justice of the Peace. From 1987 to 1991 she was responsible for investigating complaints against solicitors as Assistant to the Lay Observer for Scotland.

As a prominent member of the Edinburgh Jewish community she was editor of the Edinburgh Star. and Secretary and President (1998) of the Edinburgh Jewish Literary Society.

Adler founded the Scottish office of Amnesty International in 1991. She worked there until a few days before her death from cancer in 1994, when she was only 49 years old.

== Works ==
The theme of her thesis (1983) is legal intervention in the lives of children. It was published as a book in 1985 Taking Juvenile Justice Seriously.

== Legacy ==
Adler's obituary in The Independent describes her three passionate concerns:

'Her life was driven by three passionate concerns: for justice, for children and for her family. To all these she brought a formidable intelligence, unflagging energy, extraordinary determination and, above all, generosity of spirit and loving kindness. These passions were to touch the lives of countless people'.

There is a plaque dedicated to Ruth Adler in the garden of University of Edinburgh Day Nursery.

University of Edinburgh School of Law sponsor an annual Ruth Adler Memorial Lecture on Human Rights. Prominent speakers include Shami Chakrabarti in 2016, Sir Stephen Sedley (2015), Professor Christopher McCrudden (2013), and Professor Conor Gearty (2009).

The Ruth Adler prize is awarded annually to the best student in the Ordinary course Critical Legal Thinking.

== See also ==
- List of peace activists
