= 1994 Newham North East by-election =

UK parliamentary by-election

← 1992	9 June 1994	1997 →

Constituency of Newham North East
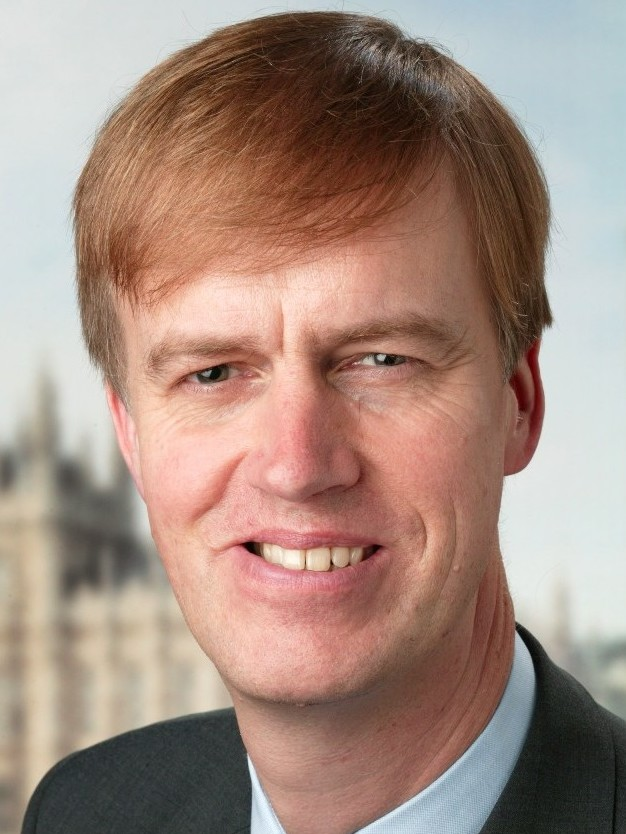

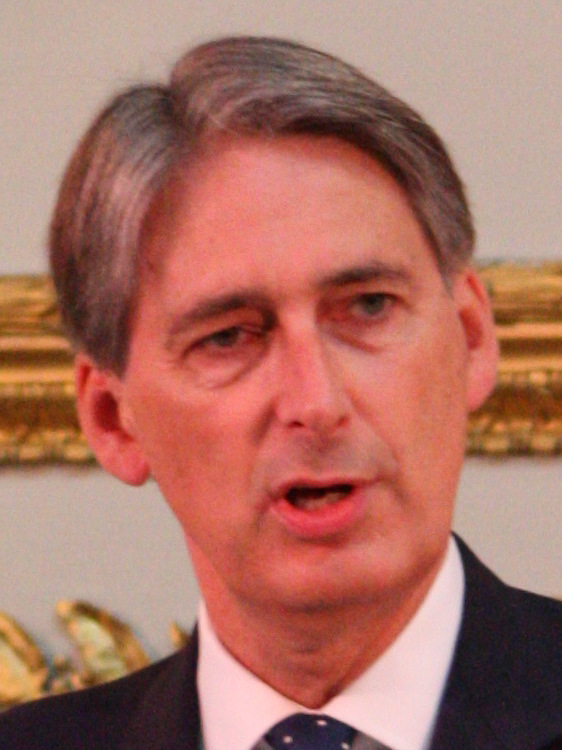
	First party	Second party
Candidate	Stephen Timms	Philip Hammond
Party	Labour	Conservative
Popular vote	14,688	2,850
Percentage	74.97%	14.55%
Swing	▲16.64%	▼15.96%
MP before election
Ron Leighton
Labour
Elected MP
Stephen Timms
Labour

The 1994 Newham North East by-election, in London Borough of Newham, on 9 June 1994 was held after long-serving Labour Member of Parliament (MP) Ron Leighton died. A safe Labour seat, it was won by Stephen Timms, who would go on to retain the East Ham seat which replaced it in 1997.

== Candidates ==
- Richard Archer was the Natural Law Party candidate. He was also a candidate for the party in the European elections of the same year in the London North East constituency.
- Vida Garman, a pornographic model, ran as a publicity stunt for the Daily Sport newspaper, which wanted to take advantage of free postage for electoral leaflets.
- Philip Hammond was chosen as the Conservative Party candidate. He was director of a medical equipment and the chairman of Lewisham East Conservative Association.
- Jo Homeless had changed her name by deed poll in order to contest the election on a campaign of housing the homeless.
- Alec Kellaway was the nominated candidate for the Liberal Democrats however immediately prior to the election Kellaway announced that he was leaving the Liberal Democrats and joining the Labour Party. Consequently, there was no official Liberal Democrat standing in the election.
- Anthony Scholefield was the candidate for the UK Independence Party.
- Stephen Timms, the Labour candidate, had previously served as the leader of the local council for four years.

== Result ==
Newham North East by-election, 1994
Party	Candidate	Votes	%	±%
Labour	Stephen Timms	14,688	74.97	+16.64
Conservative	Philip Hammond	2,850	14.55	−15.96
Liberal Democrats	Alec Kellaway	821	4.19	−7.00
UKIP	Anthony Scholefield	509	2.60	New
House Homeless People	Jo Homeless	342	1.75	New
Natural Law	Richard Archer	228	1.15	New
Buy the Daily Sport	Vida Garman	155	0.79	New
Majority		11,838	60.42	+32.63
Turnout		19,593		
Labour hold		Swing		

== Previous result ==
1992 general election: Newham North East
Party	Candidate	Votes	%	±%
Labour	Ron Leighton	20,952	58.30	+6.4
Conservative	JH Galbraith	10,966	30.51	−0.2
Liberal Democrats	JJ Aves	4020	11.19	−6.2
Majority		9,986	27.79	+6.6
Turnout		35,938	60.34	−3.8
Labour hold		Swing	+3.3	
