= Ron Leighton =

British politician

Member of Parliament for Newham North East
- In office 3 May 1979 – 28 February 1994
- Preceded by: Reg Prentice
- Succeeded by: Stephen Timms

Personal details
- Born: Ronald Leighton; 24 January 1930
- Died: 28 February 1994 (aged 64)
- Party: Labour

Ronald Leighton (24 January 1930 – 28 February 1994) was a British Labour Party politician.

== Political career ==
Leighton contested Middleton and Prestwich at the 1964 general election, but was beaten by the Conservative incumbent Sir John Barlow. At the February 1974 election he fought the new Horsham and Crawley seat, but was defeated by the Conservative Peter Hordern.

He became an MP in 1979 by regaining Newham North East for his party; it had been the seat of Reg Prentice, who during the previous Parliament had defected from Labour to the Conservatives. Leighton was opposed to British membership of the European Communities, and was Director of the Common Market Safeguards Campaign from 1970 to 1972.

He retained the seat until he died in office, aged 64, in 1994; at the subsequent by-election, the seat was held for Labour by Stephen Timms. (Coincidentally, the MP for neighbouring Barking, Jo Richardson, also died in the same month, resulting in by-elections being held on the same day for both seats).

A road in the London Borough of Newham was named after Leighton. Ron Leighton Way allows through traffic to bypass the busy East Ham High Street.

== Notes ==
Parliament of the United Kingdom
Preceded by Reg Prentice	Member of Parliament for Newham North East; 1979–1994	Succeeded by Stephen Timms
