= Newham North East =

UK Parliament constituency (1974–1997)

- Former borough constituency for the House of Commons
- County: Greater London

February 1974–1997
- Seats: One
- Created from: East Ham North and East Ham South
- Replaced by: East Ham

Newham North East was a parliamentary constituency represented in the House of Commons of the Parliament of the United Kingdom, in the London Borough of Newham. It returned one Member of Parliament, elected by the first past the post system.

== History ==
The constituency was created for the February 1974 general election, and abolished for the 1997 general election, when it was partly replaced by the new East Ham constituency.

It was one of the most multicultural constituencies in the United Kingdom; in 1981, 32.6% of the constituency were non-White. The 1991 census showed 53.4% of the constituency was of minority ethnic.

The constituency shared boundaries with the Newham North East electoral division for election of councillors to the Greater London Council at elections in 1973, 1977 and 1981.

== Boundaries ==
- 1974–1983: The London Borough of Newham wards of Castle, Central, Greatfield, Kensington, Little Ilford, Manor Park, St Stephens, Wall End, and Woodgrange
- 1983–1997: The London Borough of Newham wards of Castle, Central, Greatfield, Kensington, Little Ilford, Manor Park, Monega, St Stephens, and Wall End

== Members of Parliament ==
Election	Member	Party
February 1974	Reg Prentice	Labour
1977	Reg Prentice	Conservative
1979	Ron Leighton	Labour
1994 by-election	Stephen Timms	Labour
1997	constituency abolished	

== Elections ==
=== Elections in the 1970s ===
General election February 1974: Newham North East
Party	Candidate	Votes	%	±%
Labour	Reg Prentice	24,200	54.4	
Conservative	T.J. Stroud	10,869	24.4	
Liberal	Lionel H. Cohen	8,486	19.1	
Workers Revolutionary	Vanessa Redgrave	760	1.7	
International Marxist	John Ross	202	0.5	
Majority		13,331	30.0	
Turnout		44,517	68.0	
Labour win (new seat)				

General election October 1974: Newham North East
Party	Candidate	Votes	%	±%
Labour	Reg Prentice	22,205	56.9	+2.5
Conservative	T.J. Stroud	8,664	22.2	−2.2
Liberal	Lionel H. Cohen	4,880	12.5	−6.6
National Front	J. Newham	2,715	7.0	New
Workers Revolutionary	Vanessa Redgrave	572	1.5	−0.2
Majority		13,541	34.7	+4.7
Turnout		39,036	59.2	−8.8
Labour hold		Swing	+2.4	

General election 1979: Newham North East
Party	Candidate	Votes	%	±%
Labour	Ron Leighton	22,818	54.5	−2.4
Conservative	Cynthia Kay Wood	12,778	30.5	+8.3
Liberal	David J. Corney	4,027	9.6	−2.9
National Front	William Northcott	1,769	4.2	−2.8
Independent	John Regan	208	0.5	New
Workers Revolutionary	Michael Banda	154	0.4	−1.1
Democratic Monarchist Public Safety White Resident	William Boaks	118	0.3	New
Majority		10,040	24.0	−10.7
Turnout		41,872	63.1	+3.9
Labour hold		Swing	−6.8	

=== Elections in the 1980s ===
General election 1983: Newham North East
Party	Candidate	Votes	%	±%
Labour	Ron Leighton	19,282	49.7	−4.8
Conservative	Helen Gardener	10,773	27.8	−2.7
Liberal	Ann Winfield	7,943	20.5	+10.9
National Front	F.R. Adams	794	2.0	−2.2
Majority		8,509	21.9	−2.1
Turnout		38,792	62.1	−1.0
Labour hold		Swing	−5.2	

General election 1987: Newham North East
Party	Candidate	Votes	%	±%
Labour	Ron Leighton	20,220	51.9	+2.2
Conservative	Peter Davis	11,984	30.7	+2.9
Liberal	Harriet Steele	6,772	17.4	−3.1
Majority		8,236	21.2	−0.7
Turnout		38,976	64.1	+2.0
Labour hold		Swing		

=== Elections in the 1990s ===
General election 1992: Newham North East
Party	Candidate	Votes	%	±%
Labour	Ron Leighton	20,952	58.3	+6.4
Conservative	Jeremy H. Galbraith	10,966	30.5	−0.2
Liberal Democrats	Jonathan J. Aves	4,020	11.2	−6.2
Majority		9,986	27.8	+6.6
Turnout		35,938	60.3	−3.8
Labour hold		Swing	+3.3	

By-election 1994: Newham North East
Party	Candidate	Votes	%	±%
Labour	Stephen Timms	14,688	75.0	+16.7
Conservative	Philip Hammond	2,850	14.6	−15.9
Liberal Democrats	Alec Kellaway	821	4.2	−7.0
UKIP	Anthony Scholefield	509	2.6	New
House Homeless People	Jo Homeless	342	1.8	New
Natural Law	Richard Archer	228	1.2	New
Buy the Daily Sport	Vida Garman	155	0.8	New
Majority		11,838	60.4	+32.6
Turnout		19,593		
Labour hold		Swing		

Note: Immediately prior to the election Kellaway announced that he was leaving the Liberal Democrats and joining the Labour Party. Consequently, there was no official Liberal Democrat standing in the election
