= Flip Fraser =

Jamaican-British journalist and playwright (1951–2014)

- Born: Peter Randolph Fraser; 25 October 1951; Kingston, Jamaica
- Died: 31 August 2014 (aged 62); London, England
- Education: Vaz Prep School; Jamaica College; Bradford University
- Occupations: Journalist and playwright
- Known for: Black Heroes in the Hall of Fame
- Spouse: Joyce Fraser

Peter Randolph Fraser, known as Flip Fraser (25 October 1951 – 31 August 2014), was a Jamaican-British journalist and playwright. Fraser was founding editor of The Voice. He also wrote and directed the stage musical Black Heroes in the Hall of Fame, the first all-black cast production to play in the West End of London.

== Life ==
Fraser was born on 25 October 1951 in Kingston, Jamaica. After attending Vaz Prep School, he won a scholarship to Jamaica College. At the age of 16, he moved to the UK when his father was posted to the Jamaican High Commission in London. After completing secondary schooling, Fraser enrolled to study chemistry at Bradford University but dropped out after becoming allergic to the chemicals.

Working in the music industry with record label Trojan Records, he became interested in the media. After studying media and journalism at Tennessee State University, where he was a contemporary of Oprah Winfrey, he wrote for West Indian World, Sounds, Caribbean Times and West Indian Digest. In 1982, Val McCalla recruited him to be the first editor of The Voice.

Fraser later worked as a special projects, arts and entertainment officer for Camden Council. There he worked with J. D. Douglas, and the pair collaborated to write and stage Black Heroes in the Hall of Fame, with music by Khareem Jamal. The first all-black production to be staged in the West End, the show opened at the Shaw Theatre in 1987, with original cast members including lover's rock singer Jean Adebambo, actor and musician Count Prince Miller, reggae musician Lloyd Brown and actor Fraser James. Described by The Washington Post as "a seven-act musical extravaganza that spans 4,000 years of history", the musical went on to tour America, where Fraser and others were invited to the home of Louis Farrakhan.

== Death and legacy ==
Fraser died at St Thomas' Hospital, London, on 31 August 2014, aged 62. A memorial service was held at St Martin's-in-the-Fields. In 2016, his widow Joyce established a charity, the Black Heroes Foundation, in his memory.

Tributes to Fraser in 2024, the tenth anniversary of his death, included a stage show at Camden's Shaw Theatre entitled The Story of Flip Fraser, celebrating his birthday on 25 October.
