= Lionel Morrison =

British journalist (1935–2016)

Lionel Edmund Morrison OBE OIS
- Born: 13 October 1935; Johannesburg, South Africa
- Died: 31 October 2016 (aged 81); London, England
- Education: University of the Witwatersrand
- Occupation: Journalist
- Organization(s): African National Congress, Pan Africanist Congress, National Union of Journalists
- Spouse: Elizabeth (Liz) Morrison (nee Glover)
- Children: Dr Sipho Morrison, Dumisa Tshabalala
- Awards: Order of the British Empire (1999), Order of Ikhamanga (2003)

Lionel Edmund Morrison OBE OIS (13 October 1935 – 31 October 2016) was a South African-born British journalist, and a former president of the National Union of Journalists (NUJ). He was the first black journalist to hold that office.

== Biography ==
Lionel Morrison, whose grandfather came from the Isle of Lewis in the Outer Hebrides, was born in Johannesburg and spent his early life in South Africa, where he set up a multiracial journalists' union in the 1950s in opposition to the apartheid regime. He was arrested for treason in 1956.

Having moved to the United Kingdom in 1960, Morrison became a member of the executive council of the National Union of Journalists (NUJ) in 1971, and was elected its president in 1973. Much of his life's work focused on increasing black participation in unionism and journalism, and countering racial discrimination. In the 1970s, finding it difficult to find employment in Britain as a black journalist, Morrison was involved in setting up some of the country's first black newspapers, such as The Voice and the West Indian World. Along with fellow journalist Syd Burke, he also helped to establish journalism courses and further education colleges across London. Morrison was the principal information officer of the Commission for Racial Equality in the 1970s and 1980s. He later became vice-president and chair of Notting Hill Housing Trust where he pioneered shared ownership as a means to help minority groups get onto the property ladder.

An honorary member and life member of the NUJ, he was awarded an OBE in 2000. In 2008, he was a recipient of a South African national honour, the Order of Ikhamanga (Silver).

Morrison died on 31 October 2016, survived by his wife, two sons, two grandsons and granddaughter.

== Anti-apartheid activism ==
=== Freedom Charter and imprisonment ===
In 1955, Morrison served three months at notorious Johannesburg prison the Fort, for painting slogans on walls in Cape Town. Inspired by the Freedom Charter, he had daubed "Let us Black folk in" on a wall in the parliamentary precinct and "The People Shall Govern" on a wall nearby, resulting in his arrest for graffiti and a sentence of four months' imprisonment.

=== Treason Trial ===
On 6 December 1956, Morrison was arrested for high treason against the state, an offence that carried the death penalty, and he was put on trial along with 155 others (including Walter Sisulu and Nelson Mandela). The preliminary hearings of the Treason Trial began on 19 December at the Drill Hall. Morrison, the youngest defendant, was accused number 89. The prosecution claimed the accused had campaigned to draw up the Freedom Charter which envisaged granting equal rights to all and was tantamount to plotting the overthrow the existing state. The defence team representing Morrison and his co-accused included Vernon Berrange QC and Bram Fischer. In December 1957, the charges against Morrison and 60 others were withdrawn. The trial finally ended on 29 March 1961, when the remaining 30 defendants were acquitted.

=== Sharpeville massacre ===
Morrison joined the first act of resistance in 1961 by both the PAC and ANC, a demonstration against the pass laws, which required all Africans to carry passes. The Sharpeville massacre followed. Both liberation organisations were immediately declared illegal. Morrison and many others, including Mandela and Robert Sobukwe, were arrested resulting in Morrison serving a five-month sentence at the Fort prison until the ending of the State of Emergency.

== Journalism in South Africa ==
In 1955 Morrison worked as a reporter for Golden City Post in Cape Town, South Africa's first black weekly. The South African Union of Journalists forbade membership of black journalists. Morrison, with support of black and white journalists as well as the National Union of Journalists in London, set up the non-racial National Union of South African Journalists (NUSAJ) and became its first acting chair.

== Career and activism in the UK ==
Morrison was elected to the national executive of the National Union of Journalists (NUJ) in 1971, and served at all levels of the union. In 1974 members agreed to set up a race relations working group, with Morrison as its first chair. He first put himself forward for the presidency of the NUJ in 1977, losing to "bloody racism", but triumphed a decade later becoming the first black president in 1987.

Morrison spoke at a conference at the Eden Project in 2013 on restorative justice, linking it with the Truth and Reconciliation Commission in South Africa of which he had had some criticisms, and became patron of RJ Working (2014), an organisation promoting restorative justice in Cornwall.

== Publications ==
- As They See it: A Race Relations Study of Three Areas from a Black Viewpoint, Community Relations Commission, 1976
- Arts Education in a Multicultural Society, Commission for Racial Equality, 1981 (with Irene Staunton and Tania Rose)
- A Century of Black Journalism in Britain: A Kaleidoscopic View of Race and the Media (1893–2003), Truebay Limited, 2007, ISBN 978-0-9555540-0-1

Trade union offices
Preceded by R. Keogh	President of the National Union of Journalists; 1987–1988	Succeeded by Barbara Gunnell and S. McGuire
