= Chic (1980s magazine) =

Defunct British women's monthly magazine

Chic was a British monthly women's magazine aimed at young Black women. Launched in 1984, the magazine was one of the first for black women in Britain.

== History ==
Chic was an initiative of Val McCalla, who had earlier founded The Voice, and the magazine originally appeared as a supplement to The Voice. For the first few months it had no fixed editor, until Winsome Cornish, who had been working in public relations for The Voice, was appointed editor. From an initial circulation of 15,000, sales had risen to 32,000 by mid-1986, with half that number again sold abroad. The magazine cost 90p and consisted of around 70 pages. There was a relatively high ratio of editorial to advertising, and the magazine encountered difficulty attracting advertising from white agencies.

Its editorial intention was to cover "the whole spectrum of hair care and beauty, as well as fashion, fitness and all the other facets which contribute to the total look of a sophisticated contemporary black person." The magazine included the elements of mainstream women's magazines – lifestyle, careers, beauty and relationships – but from a Black perspective. There was also emphasis on the double discrimination of being both Black and female, and some attention paid to race and politics.

The magazine, owned by Ratepress Ltd, was discontinued in 1988.
