= Alex Pascall =

British broascaster, musician and educator (born 1936)

Alex Pascall OBE
- Born: Alexander Pascall; November 1936 (age 89–90); Grenada, Eastern Caribbean
- Occupations: Broadcaster, musician, composer, educator
- Known for: Black Londoners (BBC Radio London)
- Spouse: Joyce Pascall
- Children: Deirdre; Ayandele

Alexander Pascall, OBE (born November 1936), is a British broadcaster, journalist, musician, composer, oral historian and educator. Based in Britain for more than 50 years, he was one of the developers of the Notting Hill Carnival, is a political campaigner and was part of the team behind the birth of Britain's first national black newspaper The Voice. Credited with having "established a black presence in the British media", Pascall is most notable as having been one of the first regular Black radio voices in the UK, presenting the programme Black Londoners on BBC Radio London for 14 years from 1974. Initially planned as a test series of six programmes, Black Londoners became, in 1978, the first black daily radio show in British history.

== Biography ==
=== Early years ===
Born on the island of Grenada in the Eastern Caribbean, Pascall was the eldest son in a family of 10. He travelled to Britain as a 22-year-old in 1959, having represented his country as a musician the previous year in the Bee Wee Ballet Dance Troupe at the inauguration of the Federation of the West Indies. He had originally intended to return home after five years but has remained in the UK for more than five decades. Early on he involved himself with music and his group The Alex Pascall Singers, founded in the 1960s, is reportedly the first known multi-cultural choir in London. A former member of the group, Jacques Compton, recalls about Pascall that "in addition to being a very excellent drummer and singer, he was also a composer of some excellent songs."

=== Broadcasting career ===
Pascall gained national prominence as a broadcaster through his work with the groundbreaking BBC Radio London programme Black Londoners, first aired on 22 November 1974, which he fronted for 14 years: "It began once a month, then once a week and within a couple of years we were broadcasting every day." Britain's first daily Black radio magazine programme, the hour-long Black Londoners – "half phone-in and half news content each day" – was an important vehicle for the discussion of issues affecting the black community, in particular the New Cross Fire in 1981, and provided a mouthpiece for many black musicians, artists and politicians who either lived in or passed through the capital. Prominent guests on the programme from the worlds of politics, sport, literature and the arts included Muhammad Ali, Alex Haley, Bob Marley, Marvin Gaye, C. L. R. James, Maurice Bishop, Michael Jackson, Arthur Ashe, Althea McNish, Mustapha Matura, Jeremy Corbyn MP, Leon Britton MP, Angela Davis, Miriam Makeba and the Mighty Sparrow.

Pascall has paid tribute to the role of his late colleague Barry Clayton in the programme's genesis:

"In 1973, a contingent of people in the field of race and community relations, recognising the lack of black representation in the British media, approached BBC local radio and succeeded in obtaining a slot for black programming.

The responsibility for its development was placed in the hands of Barry Clayton as producer and Alex as presenter. We devised a magazine-style format programme for broadcast in November 1974.

Black Londoners was aired by BBC Radio London for 14 years, going on to become the first black daily radio programme broadcast in Britain from 1978 till 1988, when the station changed its name and the general format....

Barry and I also went off to the Caribbean to arrange a Christmas link-up of three of the islands (Jamaica, Barbados and Trinidad) for a special Channel 4 Christmas broadcast and developed links that later saw the return of Louise Bennett of Jamaica as one of the featured personalities for a Channel 4 series produced by Trevor Phillips."

Among others who worked with Pascall on Black Londoners were Juliet Alexander, Syd Burke and Mike Phillips.

In 1994, Pascall presented A Different Rhythm, an eight-part BBC Radio 3 series produced by Clayton and Nick Hughes, on the impact of the black presence on British music and musicians.

Other notable documentary features that Pascall has researched and presented include Caribbean Cocktail on BBC Radio 2 (1994),They Came Before the Windrush on BBC Radio 4, produced by Marina Salandy-Brown, Alex Pascall's Caribbean Folk Music (1995), Let the Music Talk (24 June 1981) on Radio 2, produced by David Corser, Sophisticated Ladies (1997, Radio 4), a celebration of Black female stars of British musical theatre since the 1850s, Cricket Calypsos (25 July 1991 on Radio 3) and World War Calypso.

Pascall is also well known for his compositions for the Early Years landmark children's TV series Teletubbies and BBC Schools.

On Boxing Day 2015, Pascall launched an online radio show called Alex Pascall's Londoners on Good Vibes Radio.

=== Community and cultural activism ===
In 1982 Pascall co-founded with Val McCalla Britain's first national weekly Black British newspaper The Voice, utilising Pascall's media connections as presenter of the BBC programme Black Londoners; the first issue of The Voice coincided with the Notting Hill Carnival that year.

From 1984 to 1989 Pascall was chairman of the Carnival and Arts Committee of the Notting Hill Carnival. Committed to internationalising Caribbean cultural developments in Britain, he also served as the founding vice-president and national representative of the Foundation for European Carnival Cities (FECC) – a federation of European carnivals.

In 1986, Pascall was appointed the National Coordinator for "Caribbean Focus 86", a festival of arts and culture, in association with the Commonwealth Institute in London and CARICOM governments. It was the first national festival to showcase Caribbean peoples' contributions in British lifestyle. Pascall worked on "Caribbean Express '86", a cultural exhibition train that travelled to 18 cities in Britain in 21 days, running educational workshops.

Pascall has frequently spoken out on issues particularly affecting the black community. He has been chair of the Black Members' Council of the National Union of Journalists (NUJ), a member of the Commonwealth Institute Education Advisory Committee, and a Trustee of the Tabernacle Arts and Community Centre in Notting Hill. Pascall is a Member of Honour of the NUJ.

Pascal makes frequent appearances as a key note speaker for university lectures, community engagement projects and appearances for schools. On occasion he still performs as a singer songwriter.

Pascall is also a playwright, oral historian and cultural strategist, teaching, performing and promoting Caribbean music and history to people of all ages in schools, universities, libraries and communities. He has written and documented material to respond to the need to make Caribbean folk arts widely accessible and holds a large historical archive spanning over five decades of Black presence in Britain." His play Common Threads, set within a plantation on the island of Grenada and Big Pit Colliery in South Wales, revolves around the history of the sugar and coal industries and was first presented in 2001 by Gwent Theatre. Pascall was also involved in pioneering the "Roots to Torfaen" local history project, "to encourage pupils, parents and community members to explore their roots, celebrate cultural diversity in their area and discover global links."

== Personal life ==
Alex Pascall and his wife Joyce have lived in Crouch Hill, London, since 1959. Their daughter Deirdre is an arts educator, composer for film, professional cellist and pianist. Their son Ayandele is a film editor.

== Awards ==
Alex Pascall was made an Officer of the Order of the British Empire (OBE) in 1996 for services to community relations. At a civic reception given by Islington Council on the day Pascall received his OBE, Sir Shridath (Sonny) Ramphal paid tribute to him as a "cultural 'guru' for Caribbean people in Britain who has spent 35 years as a commentator par excellence, teaching, performing and promoting Caribbean music and history".
