= Ken Morgan (trade unionist) =

Kenneth Morgan (3 November 1928 – 5 August 2015) was a British trade union leader and journalist.

Morgan grew up in Stockport, England, and attended Stockport Grammar School. He began working as a reporter for the Stockport Express in 1944, then left to join the British Army in 1946. He was commissioned the following year, joining the Middle East Land Forces and serving in the Army's newspaper unit.

Morgan left the military in 1949 and returned to journalism, meeting his future wife Margaret Wilson, who worked for the rival Stockport Advertiser. He joined the National Union of Journalists (NUJ), and in 1962 began working full-time for the union as its Central London Secretary. In 1966, he became the union's National Organiser, then in 1970 he was elected as General Secretary.

Alongside leading the union, Morgan served on numerous bodies, including the committees of the Printing and Kindred Trades Federation, National Federation of Professional Workers, Federation of Broadcasting Unions and Confederation of Entertainment Unions, and the bureau of the International Federation of Journalists. He was also a member of the Press Council, and in 1977 he left his trade union post, to become joint secretary of the council, then later its director.

Morgan served as a trustee of Reuters from 1984 to 1999. From the mid-1990s until the mid-2000s, he advised numerous media bodies worldwide. After his death, Roy Greenslade described him as "the pragmatist's pragmatist, good at reconciling opposing points of view and solving difficult problems."

Trade union offices
| Preceded by Jim Bradley | General Secretary of the National Union of Journalists; 1970–1977 | Succeeded by Ken Ashton |
