= Lourdes Secondary School =

Lourdes RC Secondary School

Location
- Kirriemuir Avenue; Glasgow, G52 3DF; Scotland; 55°50′38″N 4°20′28″W

Information
- Religious affiliation: Catholic
- Established: 1956
- Local authority: Glasgow
- Staff: c. 90
- Gender: Mixed
- Age: 11 to 18
- Enrolment: 1,462 pupils (2023)
- Website: https://blogs.glowscotland.org.uk/gc/LourdesSecondarySchool/

Lourdes Secondary School, established in 1956, is a school in the south-west of Glasgow which serves a large catchment area, including the communities of Cardonald, Craigton, Crookston, Drumoyne, Govan, Hillington, Ibrox, Kinning Park, Mosspark, Penilee and Pollok. It has an enrolment of approximately 1,200 pupils and 90 members of staff.

== Grounds ==
The building was designed around a quadrangle, housing collections of shrubbery. Until recently, this area featured a large flowerbed imitation of the school crest that was designed and planted by pupils as part of the celebrations for the new millennium.

It consists of one large main building, which was originally designed by Thomas Smith Cordiner and constructed in the 1950s and with an extension added in the 1970s. The school has over fifty teaching classrooms, with dedicated areas for science, technical, and music/drama. Two astroturf pitches, three gymnasiums, a games hall and a large internal garden area also make up the school grounds. The school underwent extensive refurbishment in 2002, in line with the City Council's Project 2002 programmer of school refurbishments.

== Notable former pupils ==
- Harry Conroy (1943–2010), General Secretary of the National Union of Journalists from 1985 to 1990.
- Tommy Sheridan (b. 1964), politician
- Dean Keenan (b. 1985), footballer
- Brian McBride (b. 1955), vice-president of the Confederation of British Industry
- Mhairi Black (b. 1994), politician, the youngest ever Member of Parliament (MP) elected to the House of Commons of the United Kingdom since at least the Reform Act 1832, replacing William Wentworth-Fitzwilliam
- Siriki Dembélé (b. 1996), footballer
- Peter Mullan (b. 1959), Actor & Filmmaker
