= West Indian World =

British newspaper

West Indian World was a weekly newspaper founded in 1971 in London, England, by Vincentian journalist Aubrey Baynes. Under its masthead was the strapline: "Britain's First National West Indian Weekly". The newspaper continued publication until 1985.

== History ==
Launched at a party on 16 June 1971, with claims to be the first West Indian weekly in London, the newspaper cost 5p, had 20 pages and a print run of 30,000 copies. Baynes has been described as "the true father of the Caribbean/African press in the UK", having previously started the lifestyle magazine Daylight International and edited the short-lived weekly Magnet News. West Indian World struggled financially because of lack of advertising. In 1973, the newspaper was acquired from Baynes by publisher Arif Ali.

Notable staff and contributors to West Indian World over the years included Lionel Morrison, Barbara Blake Hannah, Lindsay Barrett, Neil Kenlock, Flip Fraser, and others.

== See also ==
- West Indian Gazette, founded 1958.
- Caribbean Times, founded 1981
- The Voice, founded 1982
