= The Premises Studios =

Recording studio and café in London, England

Coordinates: 51°31′52.2″N 0°4′17.7″W

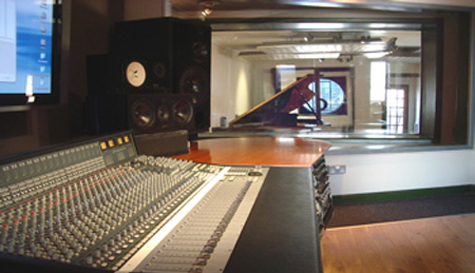
- The Premises Studios – Studio A Control Room
- Interactive map of The Premises Studios
- Location: Haggerston, London, England
- Owner: Viv Broughton
- Type: Recording studio

Construction
- Opened: 1986

Website
- premisesstudios.com

The Premises Studios is a music studio complex based near Haggerston in Hackney, London. The studio complex contains 10 commercial rehearsal studio spaces, one acoustic recording studio, one mixing studio, and various private long-let rooms and office spaces.

== History ==
Originally housed across two Victorian terrace houses at 201–203 Hackney Road, London, the studios were opened in 1986 by two local jazz musicians, Dill Katz and Colin Dudman, as a cost-effective alternative to London's more established music studios.

The buildings themselves are said to have a somewhat illicit history, prior to the music studios taking residence, with one building "reputed to be a rendezvous for illicit trysts between Lord Hamilton and Lady Hamilton" and another of the terraces said to have been a club run by notorious East End gangsters the Kray brothers.

After a difficult financial period the studios were forced to declare insolvency in 1996 and the business was bought by current owner and CEO, Viv Broughton. Broughton is a published author and gospel music historian (he had a gospel column in The Voice, which newspaper he helped to launch) and was one of the early members of The Pretty Things.

At this time The Premises Music Education Programme was established as a music-based charity, which ran a New Deal work programme and still provides workshops and courses throughout the year, often in partnership with like-minded non-for-profit organisations.

In 1998 the charity purchased the freehold of neighbouring properties and secured the future of the studios in their current location at 205–209 Hackney Road, although the original 201–203 Hackney Road studios have remained within the greater complex as long let studio spaces. Upon expansion the original buildings were demolished to make way for a bespoke new building with studios and offices over three floors. In May 2010, the arrangement between The Premises Studios Ltd and Full Frequency Ltd, the lease holders for 201–203 buildings, was dissolved. The Premises Studios business operates only in 205–209 Hackney Road.

In 2007, The Premises Studios finished work on a large acoustic recording space. This was the first solar-powered recording studio in the United Kingdom and believed to be the first in Europe.

In 2010 Hackney Council controversially ordered the removal a landmark piece of street art from the wall of The Premises, a 12-foot rabbit painted the previous year by graffiti artist ROA, with the studio's consent. Following a campaign, the council reviewed the case and "decided not to take action because the rabbit had been in situ for some time and had not provoked complaints".

== Environmental/political involvement ==
On 7 June 2007, lead singer of Razorlight rock band, Johnny Borrell, recorded a song for Friends of the Earth as part of the Big Ask Campaign in the new solar-powered studio. The Big Ask was a widely publicised political campaign designed to lobby government to introduce a climate change law, which committed the UK to cutting its carbon dioxide emissions by at least three per cent every year.

Later in 2007, The Premises joined Friends of the Earth and various lobbying bodies to further establish the 10:10 movement, a business group advocating the cut of carbon emissions by 10% by 2010.

In April 2008, The Premises Studios once again joined Friends of the Earth and the Renewable Energy Association to continue to lobby Government, calling for a financial reward for homes and businesses that generate their own clean renewable energy. The Energy Bill was amended in part as a result of this campaign, which had the support of recording artist Lily Allen.

On 5 October 2010, The Premises received the Audio Pro International Award for Most Original Studio Initiative for its solar-powered recording studio.

In June 2011, The Premises won the Best Green Business Award at the annual MusicWeek Awards. This was the first time the award featured at the Music Week Awards.

== Artists who have recorded and rehearsed at the studios ==
The studios have been used by musicians such as Nina Simone, Arctic Monkeys, Dave Brubeck, Billy Cobham, Nick Cave, Amy Winehouse, Jamie Cullum, Al Green, Franz Ferdinand, Charlotte Church, Hot Chip, Babyshambles, FKA twigs, Simian Mobile Disco, Oysterband, Taj Mahal, The Magic Numbers, The Infadels, Peaches, Klaxons, London Community Gospel Choir, Lady Sovereign, and many more touring and recording artists.

== The Premises Café ==
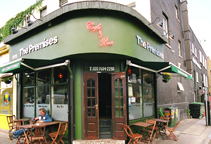
The Premises Cafe and Studios

The Premises Café is the studios' café restaurant, placed at the front of the complex in Hackney, and is also open to the general public.

In the early days of the studios being based at 201–203 Hackney Road, a mixture of studio staff and musicians staffed the café. Broughton said of this: "Musicians understand musicians. Musicians aren’t so good at running the café side of things – in fact, when I let them do it they always made a loss – but it makes complete sense for the studios." The Café business is now owned and operated as a family business, and services the studios as well as the general public.

In April 2007, The Premises Café was awarded Best Turkish Restaurant in the Evening Standard′s annual restaurant competition. On 24 May 2009, it was featured in The Guardian newspaper's food feature "50 coolest places to eat".

The walls of the café are lined with signed photographs of famous studio clients.
