= Francis Beckett =

English author, journalist, biographer and contemporary historian

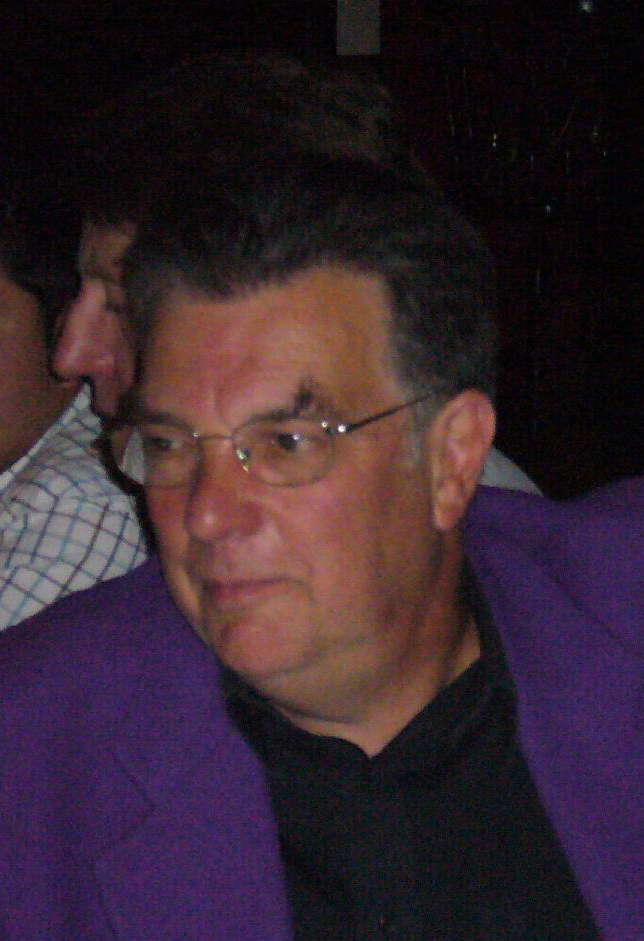
- Born: 12 May 1945 (age 81); Chenies, Buckinghamshire, England
- Occupations: Journalist, author and contemporary historian
- Known for: Biographies of Tony Blair and Gordon Brown
- Father: John Beckett
- Website: francisbeckett.co.uk

Francis Beckett (born 12 May 1945) is an English author, journalist, biographer, playwright and contemporary historian. He has written biographies of Aneurin Bevan, Clement Attlee, Harold Macmillan, Gordon Brown and Tony Blair. He has also written on education for the New Statesman, The Guardian and The Independent and has been the editor of Third Age Matters, the national magazine published by the University of the Third Age. Beckett has been described as "an Old Labour romantic" by Guardian associate editor Michael White. He is the recipient of an Independent Radio Drama Productions Award for the Sons of Catholic Gentlemen and the Ted Wragg Award for lifetime achievement in education journalism.

== Career ==
Beckett studied at Keele University, and co-led the late-night revue by the university's theatre company whilst there. He is a former press officer of the National Union of Students. He was elected president of the National Union of Journalists in 1980, and has also worked as a Labour Party press officer. In 1983 he worked for the unsuccessful Labour Party deputy leadership campaign of John Silkin. Since 1984 he has been a freelance writer. He has written regularly on education for The Guardian, as well as other newspapers, and was education correspondent of the New Statesman for seven years.

== Works ==
Beckett's works include journalism, biography, plays and contemporary history. He also edited Third Age Matters, the national magazine published by the University of the Third Age.

=== Biographies ===
Beckett has written a biography of his own father, John Beckett, entitled The Rebel Who Lost His Cause: The Tragedy of John Beckett MP. His father was a Labour MP from 1925 to 1931 and whip of the Independent Labour Party group of MPs. He was later chief propagandist for Oswald Mosley's British Union of Fascists and co-founder (with William Joyce) of the National Socialist League. He was interned during the Second World War for his fascist activities. Peter Catterall, writing in Albion, described the biography as "an act of filial piety" and noted that much of the work is based on John Beckett's own unpublished memoirs. Fascist in the Family (2016) returned to update this family history. Martin Bright, writing in The Jewish Chronicle, described as "part political history, part memoir: an attempt to come to terms with the horror of growing up with a fascist as a father".

The subjects of Beckett's other biographical works include: Aneurin Bevan, Clement Attlee, Harold Macmillan, Gordon Brown and Tony Blair. He was also editor of the twenty-book series Prime Ministers of the Twentieth Century. His biography of Clement Attlee was described by Denis MacShane as a "joy to read", in contrast to other more "ponderous" works on Attlee. MacShane also praised how the biography quoted from the poetry that Attlee wrote throughout his life. His biography of Attlee was endorsed by Roy Jenkins who was quoted in its publication as saying: "Beckett gets near to the essence of Attlee, and does so in an easy, flowing narrative". Beckett's 2004 biography of Tony Blair, co-authored (with David Hencke, was considered hostile by Roy Hattersley. Blair Inc: The Man Behind The Mask, co-written with David Hencke and Nick Kochan, was published in March 2015. Beckett has been described as "an Old Labour romantic" by Guardian associate editor Michael White.

=== Contemporary history ===
The 2009 book, Marching to the Fault Line, also written with David Hencke, is according to Seumas Milne, "the first attempt since its immediate aftermath to offer a full account of the [miners'] strike." It is, according to Neil Kinnock, who is quoted on the cover of the book, "full of vital insights and written with a sense of pace that does justice to the tragic drama." His portrayal of Arthur Scargill in it led Andrew Murray, in the Morning Star, to advise readers not to "feed the jackals". In response, with co-author David Hencke, Beckett insisted that the writers were not jackals but lifelong trade unionists, and asserted that "for Murray to try to make out that you are doing something bad by buying or reading our book is not just censorship, but also the bitterest form of ideological rigidity and sectarianism". In 2010 What Did the Baby Boomers Ever Do For Us? was published by Biteback Publishing. The book claims that the baby boomer generation benefited from historical circumstances, but has not continued to share the benefits of this with future generations.

=== Plays ===
Beckett is also a playwright. His first play, Sons of Catholic Gentlemen, was performed on LBC radio in 1997 and won Independent Radio Drama Productions Award. His 2012 play The London Spring portrays a dystopian future where an American tourist discovers that in this London bribery and corruption and mass poverty are everywhere. Michael Billington, in his review in The Guardian, described the play as having a "graphic vividness" but the love story was unbelievable. His 2024 play Vodka with Stalin told the life of Rose Cohen, a British suffragist who was murdered in a Stalinist purge in Russia in 1937. In that same year he wrote Tom Lehrer is Teaching Math and Doesn't Want to Talk to You, which features songs that Tom Lehrer placed in the public domain in 2022. It was performed at the Upstairs at The Gatehouse theatre in Highgate, London.

== Awards ==
- Independent Radio Drama Productions Award for Sons of Catholic Gentlemen (1997)
- Ted Wragg Award for lifetime achievement in education journalism (2009)

== Bibliography ==
=== Biographies ===
- The Rebel Who Lost His Cause: The Tragedy of John Beckett MP, Allison and Busby, 1999
- (with Clare Beckett) Nye Bevan, Haus Publishing, 2004; updated edition, paperback, Haus Publishing, 2024
- (with David Hencke) The Blairs and Their Court, Aurum Press, 2004 (revised and enlarged in paperback as The Survivor: Tony Blair in Peace and War, Aurum Press, 2005)
- Gordon Brown, Haus Publishing, 2007
- Clem Attlee, Politicos, re-issued 2007
- Laurence Olivier, Haus Publishing, 2005
- Harold Macmillan, Haus Publishing, 2006
- Blair Inc: The Money, The Scandals, The Power, John Blake Publishing Ltd., 2015
- Fascist in the Family: The Tragedy of John Beckett MP, Routledge, 2016

=== Contemporary history ===
- Enemy Within – The Rise and Fall of British Communism, John Murray (hardback), 1995; Merlin Press (paperback), 1998
- Stalin's British Victims, Sutton Publishing, 2004
- (with David Hencke) Marching to the Fault Line – The Miners’ Strike 1984-5, Constable and Robinson, 2009
- Firefighters and the Blitz, Merlin Press, 2010
- What Did the Baby Boomers Ever Do For Us?, Biteback Publishing, 2010
- (with Tony Russell) 1956: The Year That Changed Britain, Biteback Publishing, 2015
- (with Mark Seddon) Jeremy Corbyn and the Strange Rebirth of Labour England, Biteback Publishing, 2018

=== Education ===
- The Great City Academy Fraud, Continuum, March 2007
- How To Create a Successful School, Biteback Publishing, 2010

=== Published plays ===
- Money Makes you Happy, Samuel French, 2008
- The Right Honourable Lady, Samuel French, 2009
- Clement Attlee – A Modest Little Man, TSL Publications 2022

=== Unpublished plays ===
- Sons of Catholic Gentlemen, 1997
- Vodka with Stalin (originally entitled Harry and Rose), performed at Upstairs at the Gatehouse, London, 2024
- Tom Lehrer is Teaching Math and Doesn't Want to Talk to You, first performed at Upstairs at the Gatehouse, London, May–June 2024
- It Couldn't Happen Here (originally entitled MEGA), first performed at Upstairs at the Gatehouse, London, 2025

Trade union offices
Preceded by Jacob Ecclestone	President of the National Union of Journalists; 1980–1981	Succeeded by Harry Conroy
