= Viv Broughton =

British studio owner and gospel historian (born 1943)

- Born: 24 May 1943 (age 83)
- Other name: Viv Andrews
- Occupations: Music entrepreneur and writer
- Known for: Owner and CEO of The Premises Studios
- Notable work: Too Close to Heaven: The Illustrated History of Gospel Music (1996)

Vivian John 'Viv' Broughton (born 24 May 1943, England) is a British studio owner, music entrepreneur and writer, who is CEO of The Premises Studios, described by London Jazz News as "a vitally important and popular London recording and rehearsal venue". A one-time early member of rock group The Pretty Things, Broughton went on to help launch in 1982 The Voice newspaper, for which he wrote the column "Soul Stirrings", featuring many up-and-coming artists. Also a gospel historian, Broughton is the author of the Channel 4 book Too Close to Heaven: The Illustrated History of Gospel Music (1996).

== Background ==
=== Early career ===
Broughton had an early career as a musician in the 1960s, under the name Viv Andrews, playing with David Bowie and with rock group The Pretty Things as a drummer.

In 1982, he helped launch The Voice, a weekly newspaper aimed at the British African-Caribbean community, being brought in as marketing manager by founder Val McCalla, and from April 1983 Broughton wrote a column in the newspaper called "Soul Stirrings", which featured many up-and-coming artists. He was also a mentor and manager to groups and singers including Mica Paris, who has said: "Viv Broughton has done a lot for gospel music, and there has been a total lack of recognition for his incredible contribution to pushing and contributing to its growth."

=== Black Gospel ===
As a gospel music historian, Broughton is the author of the books Black Gospel: An Illustrated History of the Gospel Sound (1985) and Too Close to Heaven: The Illustrated History of Gospel Music (1996), which tied in with a Channel 4 television series. According to Tony Cummings of Cross Rhythms magazine, he "brings real overview to a story populated with hundreds of major figures and as a starting off point in exploring the absorbing history of possibly THE most important musical stories of the 20th century it's unlikely there'll be a better book than this....Britain's Viv Broughton is to be congratulated for coming up with a vivid history of a music in a work that no American writer has come close to equalling."

=== The Premises ===
Since 1996, Broughton has been owner and chief executive of The Premises Studios near Haggerston, in Hackney, London, transforming it into a musical institution that is much sought after by high-profile artistes for rehearsal space and recording, with innovative ventures including the installation of solar panels and the opening of a café. In addition, he launched The Premises Music Education Programme, partnering with other not-for-profit organisations to provide workshops and courses. Broughton once characterised The Premises as "…between a hotel and a crèche for noisy overgrown children". In a November 2025 article in The Observer, he was quoted as saying: "What we’ve established here is a seven-day-a-week art centre that operates entirely self-sufficiently... It's a business model for how an art centre can function without being subsidised, and I don't think there's anything like it anywhere in Britain."

=== Tomorrow's Warriors ===
Broughton is a trustee of jazz music education and artist development organisation Tomorrow's Warriors. He served as chair of the board until September 2025, when he was succeeded in the role by Tove Okunniwa MBE.

== Bibliography ==
- Black Gospel: An Illustrated History of the Gospel Sound, Blandford Press, 1985, ISBN 978-0713715408.
- Too Close to Heaven: The Illustrated History of Gospel Music (A Channel Four Book), Midnight Books, 1996, ISBN 978-1900516006.
