= Murby =

Murby is a surname. Notable people with the surname include:

- J. W. Murby (1872–1923), British trade unionist and socialist politician
- Millicent Murby (1873–1951), British socialist activist
- Ness Murby (born 1985) is a Canadian Paralympic javelin and discus thrower
