= Brian McBride (businessman) =

British businessman (born 1955)

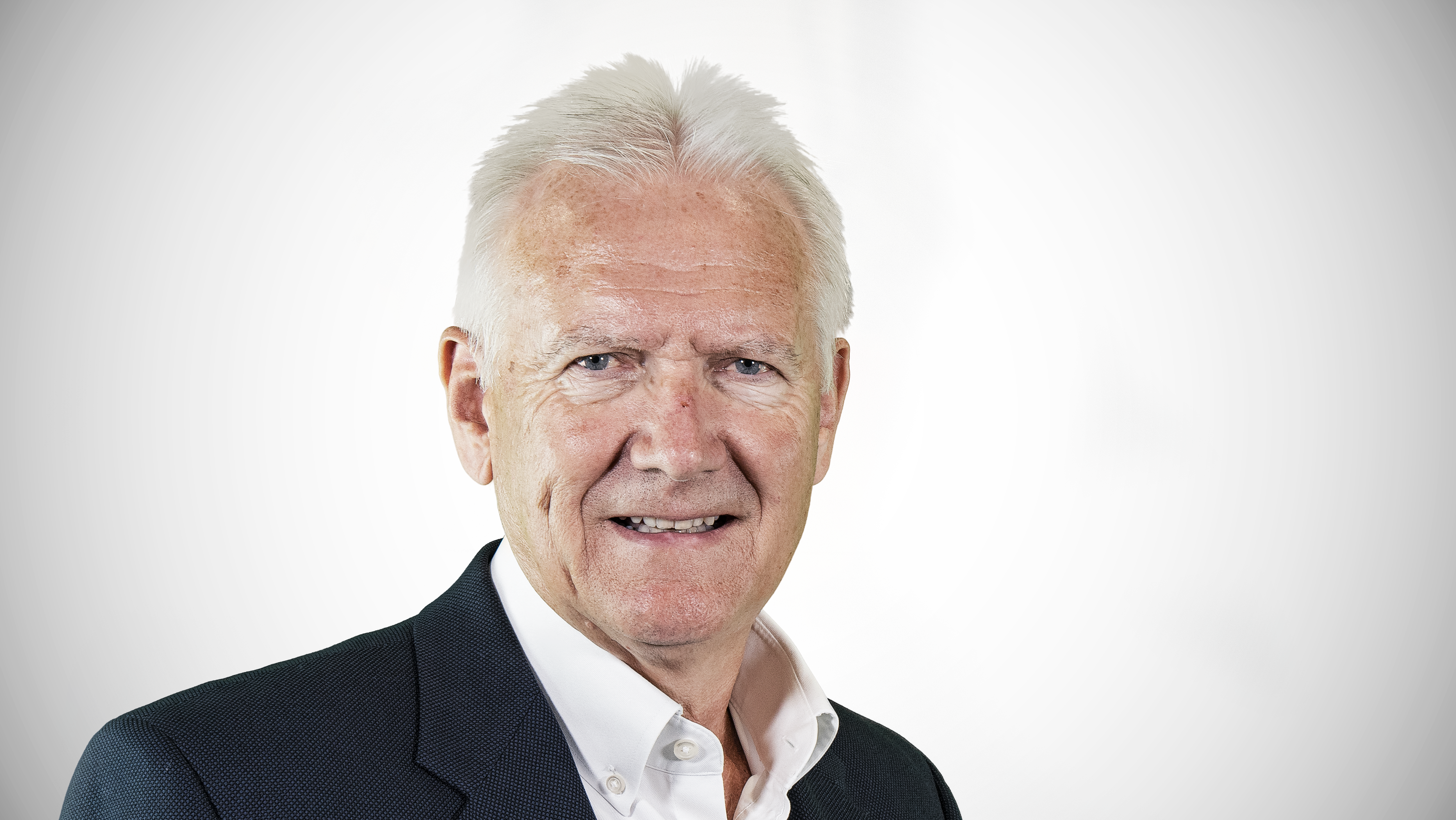
- Born: 15 October 1955 (age 70); Glasgow
- Occupation: Businessman

Brian McBride (born 15 October 1955) is a Scottish businessman.

== Early life ==
Born in Glasgow on 15 October 1955, Brian McBride grew up in a council home along with his seven siblings, his mother (a nurse) and his father (a teacher).

He attended the neighbourhood state school, Lourdes Secondary School, before going on to Glasgow University, where he earned a degree in economic history and politics.

== Career ==
Brian is currently Chair of Trainline plc, an Independent Non-Executive member of the Public Interest Committee of KPMG and a senior adviser at Scottish Equity Partners. He recently concluded his role as Lead non-Executive Director on the Board of the Ministry of Defence, an appointment made by the UK Prime Minister. As President of the CBI from 2022 - 2024, he also led the organisation through its recent issues enabling it to rebuild under new leadership. Brian was Chairman of ASOS plc from 2012 to 2018, CEO of Amazon in the UK from 2006 to 2011 and served as a non-Executive Director on the Board of the BBC and on the Board of Celtic FC plc. He previously held senior roles at IBM in USA and UK, at Dell Computers and as Managing Director of T-Mobile in the UK.

== Awards ==
McBride was awarded an honorary degree (D Univ)from his Alma Mater, the University of Glasgow in June 2024 for his services to business and philanthropy.

In June 2025 he was elected a Fellow of the Royal Society of Edinburgh (FRSE), Scotland’s national academy (founded in 1783) which brings together business, academia, science and the arts.

== Personal life ==
McBride has been married to his wife since 1980. They have two daughters and four grandchildren.
