= Michelle Stanistreet =

English trade unionist and journalist

Michelle Stanistreet (born 1974) is an English trade unionist and journalist, general secretary of the National Union of Journalists (NUJ) from 2011 to 2024. She was the first woman to hold the post at the NUJ – she was previously deputy general secretary. She replaced Jeremy Dear in July 2011.

== Early life ==
Born and raised in Liverpool, the daughter of a police officer, she gained a scholarship to Merchant Taylors' School in Crosby, and graduated with a degree in English and History from Liverpool University.

== Journalism career ==
Stanistreet worked as a journalist for ten years at the Sunday Express newspaper as feature writer and books editor. She was elected the NUJ Mother of the Chapel at Express Newspapers, almost immediately after Richard Desmond took over in 2000 and campaigned successfully for recognition at the newspapers. Under her leadership, the NUJ Chapel twice reported their own newspaper to the Press Complaints Commission –- in 2001 over coverage of asylum seekers and, in 2004, over coverage of Romani People, unsuccessfully on both occasions.

== NUJ positions ==
Stanistreet also served as the national representative for newspapers and agencies on the NUJ's ruling National Executive Committee (NEC). In 2006, she was elected vice-president of the NUJ and in 2007–08 served as the union's president. She was the first woman deputy general secretary, elected in 2008, and became the first woman in the NUJ's history to be elected as general secretary in April 2011. She announced her decision to step down in July 2024, and Laura Davison was elected as her successor.

== Politics ==
In February 2013, in line with the NUJ, Stanistreet was among those who gave their support to the People's Assembly in a letter published by The Guardian newspaper.

Trade union offices
Preceded by Chris Morley	President of the National Union of Journalists; 2007–2008	Succeeded by James Doherty
Preceded by Jeremy Dear	General Secretary of the National Union of Journalists; 2011–2024	Succeeded by Laura Davison
