= Johanna Baxter =

British politician

Johanna Baxter MP
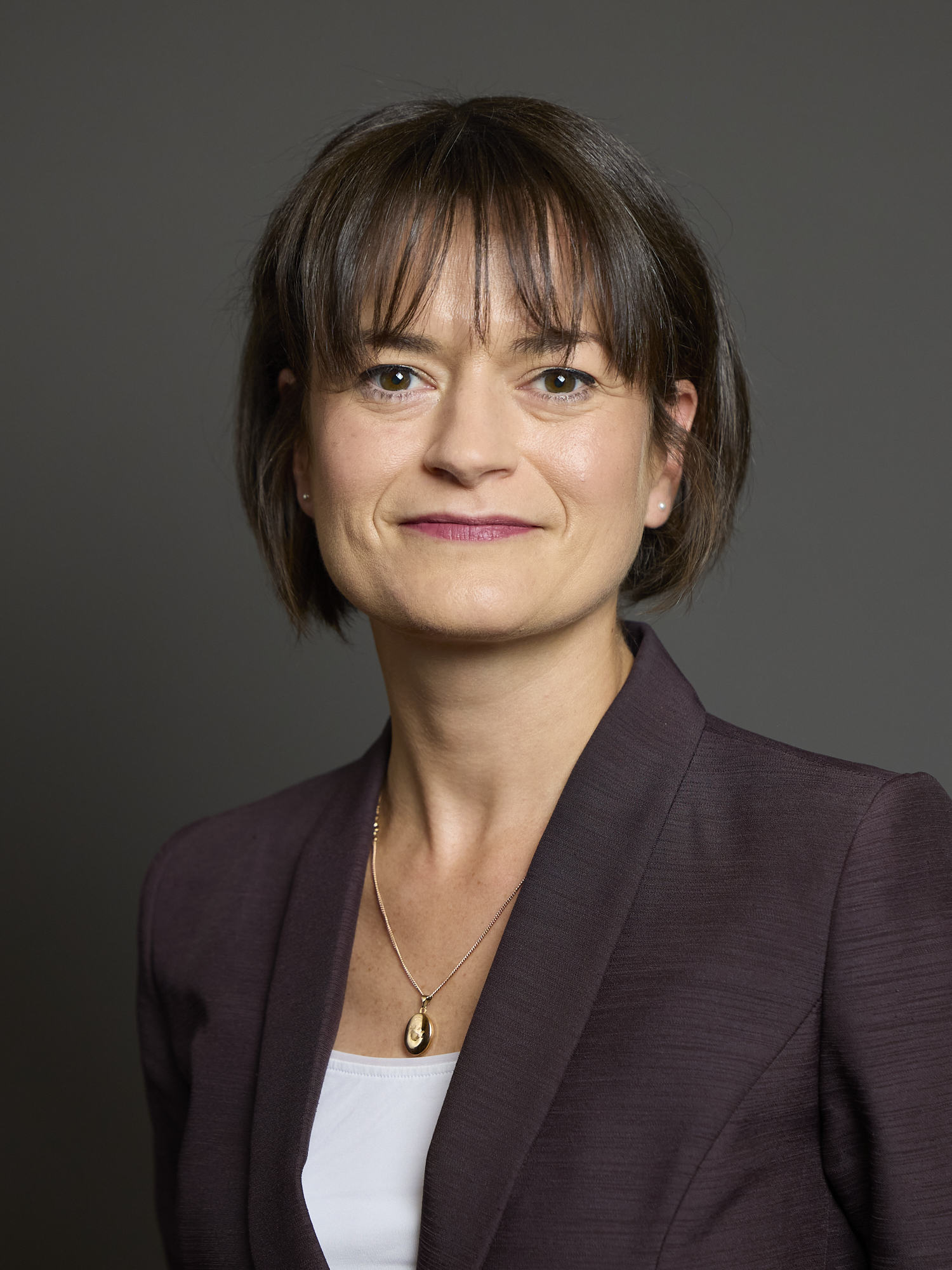
- Official portrait, 2024.

Member of Parliament for Paisley and Renfrewshire South
- Incumbent
- Assumed office 4 July 2024
- Preceded by: Mhairi Black
- Majority: 6,527 (15.8%)

Personal details
- Born: March 1979 (age 47) Saltcoats, Scotland
- Party: Labour
- Education: University of Strathclyde

Johanna Baxter (born March 1979) is a Scottish Labour politician who has served as the member of Parliament (MP) for Paisley and Renfrewshire South since 2024.

== Early life and education ==
Born in Saltcoats, Baxter attended Ardrossan Academy and then the University of Strathclyde. She became a union representative at 18. Baxter funded her way through university by working at a call centre.

== Career ==
Baxter served as head of local government for Unison Scotland. She served on the National Executive Committee of the Labour Party from 2010 to 2016 then was elected vice chair in 2021 and chair from 2022 to 2023. She contested the seat of Renfrewshire North and West in the 2021 Holyrood election and the seat of Cunninghame North in the 2016 Holyrood election.

As a member of Labour's NEC, in 2016 Baxter criticised the lack of a secret ballot for a decision on whether to allow then Labour leader Jeremy Corbyn on to the leadership ballot, saying that it led to intimidation by Corbyn supporters against NEC members who voted against allowing him to stand for the Labour leadership: "The only reason to vote against that is so the intimidation can continue. It’s the most shameful act I have ever seen. He showed his true colours in that vote. I have had people tweet and post my personal mobile online, directing people to me, directing their mob at me," Baxter said.

=== House of Commons ===
At the 2024 general election, Baxter was elected as the member of Parliament for Paisley and Renfrewshire South, with 19,583 votes (a share of 47.4%) and a majority of 6,527 votes over second-placed Jacqueline Cameron of the SNP.

On 24 July 2024, Baxter made her maiden speech in the House of Commons during a debate on education and opportunity.

On 20 May 2026, she was appointed Parliamentary Private Secretary to the Foreign, Commonwealth and Development Office. She lost this role when Andy Burnham became Prime Minister.

== Personal life ==
Baxter is married to Mark Glover, Executive Chairman of SEC Newgate UK.

== Awards ==
- Order of Merit, 3rd сlass (Ukraine, 2026)
