= Harry Richardson (trade unionist) =

British journalist and trade unionist (1876–1936)

Henry Marriott Richardson (1876 – 23 December 1936) was a British journalist and trade union leader.

Born in Hanley, in Staffordshire, Richardson became a journalist on the Staffordshire Sentinel in 1894. In 1899, he moved to the Birmingham Daily Gazette, then in 1905 became the literary editor of the Manchester Evening Chronicle. He also wrote several plays, including Gentlemen of the Press, The Awakening Woman, Snow White and Courage, and the novels The Temple Murder and The Rock of Justice.

Richardson joined the National Union of Journalists (NUJ), and in 1918 was elected as its general secretary. He represented the union on the Joint Industrial Council for the Printing Trades, which he chaired in 1930/31, and from 1930 to 1932 additionally served as president of the International Federation of Journalists.

Trade union offices
Preceded by New position	Editor of The Journalist; 1907–1918	Succeeded by F. J. Mansfield
Preceded by William Watts	General Secretary of the National Union of Journalists; 1918–1936	Succeeded by Clement Bundock
Preceded by Georg Bernhard	President of the International Federation of Journalists; 1930–1932	Succeeded by Herman Dons
