= Jeremy Dear =

British trade unionist (born 1966)

Jeremy Dear (born 6 December 1966) is a British trade unionist.

Dear graduated from Coventry Polytechnic before completing a diploma in journalism at University College Cardiff. From 1989, he worked for the Essex Chronicle and the Big Issue, joining the National Union of Journalists (NUJ). He led an eleven-month strike at the Chronicle against de-recognition of the NUJ. Between 1994 and 1997, he was the editor of the Big Issue in the Midlands, then in 1997 became the National Organiser of the NUJ.

In 2001, Dear was elected as the General Secretary of the NUJ, its youngest ever leader, and only the second to serve two terms. He also spent time as a member of the General Council of the Trades Union Congress.

As leader, Dear became known as a member of the "Awkward Squad" of left-wing trade unionists. He is married to Paula Dear, who is a journalist with the BBC. Jeremy Dear is a supporter of the Marxist newspaper Socialist Appeal.

Trade union offices
Preceded by Kyran Connolly	President of the National Union of Journalists; 1996–1998	Succeeded by Mark Turnbull
Preceded by John Foster	General Secretary of the National Union of Journalists; 2001–2011	Succeeded by Michelle Stanistreet
Preceded by Tony Burke	Chair of the Trades Union Councils' Joint Consultative Committee c.2005–2011	Succeeded by Bob Crow
