= Paisley and Renfrewshire South =

UK Parliament constituency (since 2005)

Coordinates: 55.814°N 4.485°W

- County constituency for the House of Commons
- Paisley and Renfrewshire South shown within Scotland.
- Subdivision: Renfrewshire
- Electorate: 69,813 (March 2020)
- Major settlements: Paisley, Johnstone, Kilbarchan, Howwood, Lochwinnoch

Current constituency
- Created: 2005
- Member of Parliament: Johanna Baxter (Labour)
- Created from: Paisley South, Paisley North, and Renfrewshire West

Paisley and Renfrewshire South is a constituency of the House of Commons, located in Renfrewshire, Scotland to the southwest of Glasgow. It elects one member of Parliament at least once every five years using the first-past-the-post system of voting and has been represented since 2024 by Johanna Baxter of Scottish Labour.

== Boundaries ==
Map of boundaries 2005–2024

Map of boundaries from 2024

2005–2024: Under the Fifth Review of UK Parliament constituencies, this seat was created for the 2005 general election from the bulk of the former Paisley South seat, with minor additions from neighbouring constituencies. Covering the southern portion of the Renfrewshire council area, the constituency includes around half of Paisley, as well as the smaller town of Johnstone and the villages of Kilbarchan and Elderslie. The remainder of the seat is more rural, containing the villages of Lochwinnoch, Howwood, several hamlets and farmland. The constituency also contains the Gleniffer Braes Country Park to the south and Clyde Muirshiel Regional Park to the west, notable for Castle Semple Loch.

2024–present: Further to the completion of the 2023 review of Westminster constituencies, the small town of Linwood and village of Brookfield was added to the constituency, alongside some minor changes in Paisley. The redrawn seat was contested for the first time at the 2024 general election.

The seat is defined as comprising the following wards or part wards of Renfrewshire Council:

- In full: Paisley East and Central; Paisley Southeast; Paisley Southwest; Johnstone South and Elderslie; Johnstone North, Kilbarchan, Howwood and Lochwinnoch.
- In part: Paisley Northwest (southern areas comprising about 55% of the electorate); Houston, Crosslee and Linwood (southeastern areas including the communities of Linwood and Brookfield).

== Members of Parliament ==
The constituency's first MP was Douglas Alexander, who had held the seat since its creation in 2005 and its predecessor Paisley South since 1997. Alexander was the Shadow Foreign Secretary from 2011 until he was defeated at the 2015 general election, and had previously held Cabinet posts such as Transport Secretary and Scottish Secretary (2006–07; joint), and International Development Secretary (2007–10). He was subsequently elected as MP for Lothian East at the 2024 general election.

When SNP candidate Mhairi Black gained the seat in May 2015, she was 20 years and 237 days old, making her the youngest Member of Parliament (MP) elected to the House of Commons since at least the Reform Act 1832, replacing William Wentworth-Fitzwilliam; who was 20 years and 11 months old when elected in 1832. She subsequently held the seat at the 2017 and 2019 general elections. On 4 July 2023, Black announced that she would be standing down as an MP at the next general election.

Election	Member	Party
2005	Douglas Alexander	Labour
2015	Mhairi Black	SNP
2024	Johanna Baxter	Labour

== Elections ==
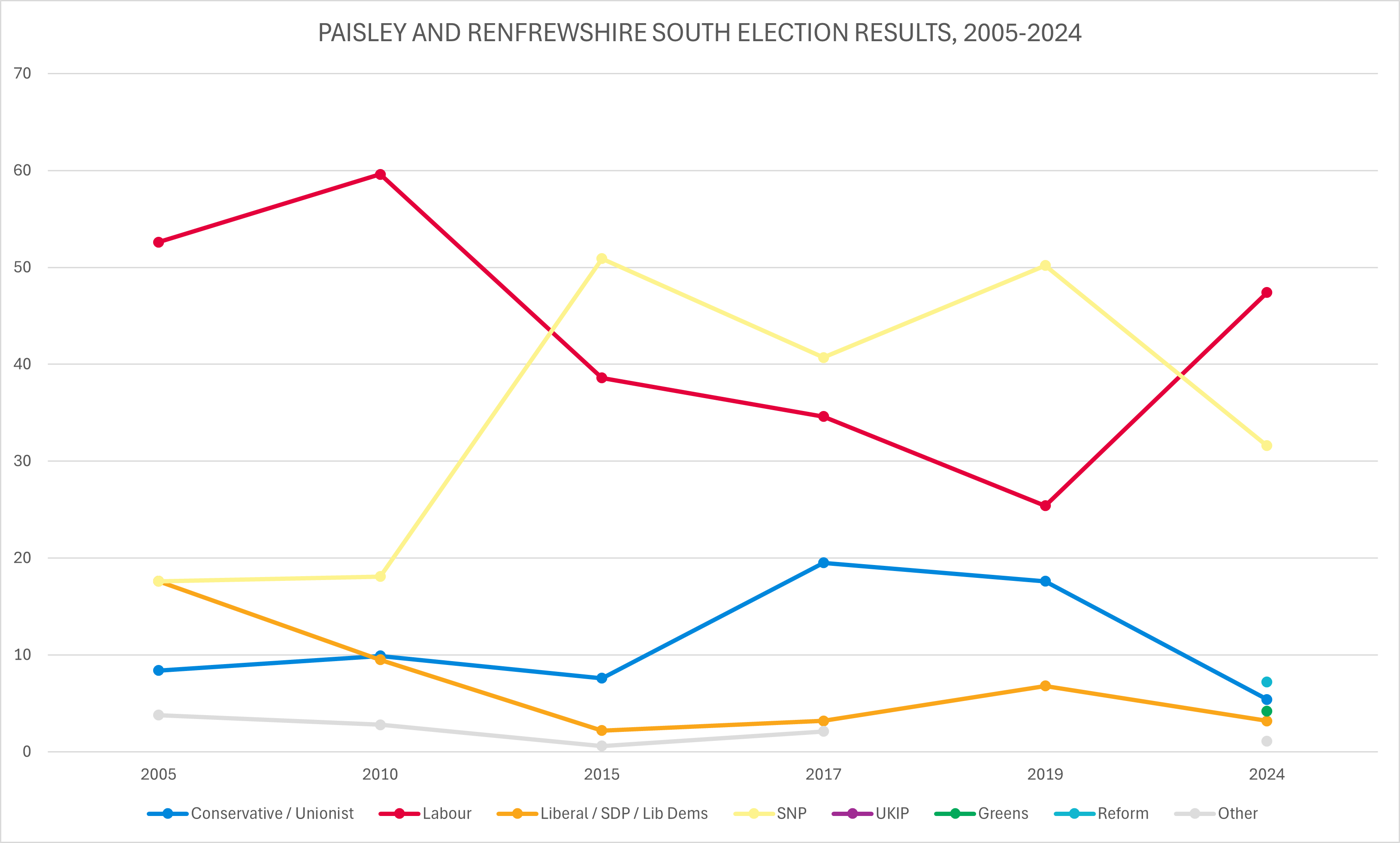
Election results 2005-2024

=== Elections in the 2020s ===
General election 2024: Paisley and Renfrewshire South
Party	Candidate	Votes	%	±%
Labour	Johanna Baxter	19,583	47.4	+21.6
SNP	Jacqueline Cameron	13,056	31.6	−18.2
Reform	Jim McIlroy	2,956	7.2	New
Conservative	Alec Leishman	2,219	5.4	−12.8
Green	Athol Bond	1,724	4.2	New
Liberal Democrats	Jack Clark	1,315	3.2	−3.0
Independent	Paul Mack	317	0.8	New
Freedom Alliance	Mark Niven Turnbull	113	0.3	New
Majority		6,527	15.8	N/A
Turnout		41,283	57.7	−8.3
Registered electors		71,574		
Labour gain from SNP		Swing	+19.9	

=== Elections in the 2010s ===
2019 notional result (Note: Estimate of the 2019 general election result as if the revised boundaries recommended under the 2023 boundary review were in place)
Party	Vote	%
SNP	22,933	49.8
Labour	11,910	25.8
Conservative	8,366	18.2
Liberal Democrats	2,869	6.2
Majority	11,023	23.9
Turnout	46,078	66.0
Electorate	69,813	

General election 2019: Paisley and Renfrewshire South
Party	Candidate	Votes	%	±%
SNP	Mhairi Black	21,637	50.2	+9.5
Labour	Moira Ramage	10,958	25.4	−9.2
Conservative	Mark Dougan	7,571	17.6	−1.9
Liberal Democrats	Jack Clark	2,918	6.8	+3.6
Majority		10,679	24.8	+18.7
Turnout		43,084	66.9	−1.1
SNP hold		Swing	+9.4	

General election 2017: Paisley and Renfrewshire South
Party	Candidate	Votes	%	±%
SNP	Mhairi Black	16,964	40.7	−10.2
Labour	Alison Dowling	14,423	34.6	−4.0
Conservative	Amy Thomson	8,122	19.5	+11.9
Liberal Democrats	Eileen McCartin	1,327	3.2	+1.0
Independent	Paul Mack	876	2.1	New
Majority		2,541	6.1	−6.2
Turnout		41,712	68.0	−7.4
SNP hold		Swing	−3.1	

General election 2015: Paisley and Renfrewshire South
Party	Candidate	Votes	%	±%
SNP	Mhairi Black	23,548	50.9	+32.8
Labour	Douglas Alexander	17,864	38.6	−21.0
Conservative	Fraser Galloway	3,526	7.6	−2.3
Liberal Democrats	Eileen McCartin	1,010	2.2	−7.3
Scottish Socialist	Sandra Webster	278	0.6	−0.3
Majority		5,684	12.3	N/A
Turnout		46,226	75.4	+10.0
SNP gain from Labour		Swing	+26.9	

General election 2010: Paisley and Renfrewshire South
Party	Candidate	Votes	%	±%
Labour	Douglas Alexander	23,842	59.6	+7.0
SNP	Andrew Doig	7,228	18.1	+0.5
Conservative	Gordon McCaskill	3,979	9.9	+1.5
Liberal Democrats	Ashay Ghai	3,812	9.5	−8.1
Independent	Paul Mack	513	1.3	New
Scottish Socialist	Jimmy Kerr	375	0.9	−1.2
Independent	William Hendry	249	0.6	New
Majority		16,614	41.5	+6.5
Turnout		39,998	65.4	+2.5
Labour hold		Swing	+3.3	

=== Elections in the 2000s ===
General election 2005: Paisley and Renfrewshire South
Party	Candidate	Votes	%	±%
Labour	Douglas Alexander	19,904	52.6	−4.4
Liberal Democrats	Eileen McCartin	6,672	17.6	+8.0
SNP	Andrew Doig	6,653	17.6	−3.3
Conservative	Thomas Begg	3,188	8.4	0.0
Scottish Socialist	Iain Hogg	789	2.1	−0.7
Pride in Paisley Party	Gordon Matthew	381	1.0	New
Independent	Robert Rodgers	166	0.4	New
Socialist Labour	Howard Broadbent	107	0.3	New
Majority		13,232	35.0	
Turnout		37,860	62.9	
Labour win (new seat)				
