= Dill Katz =

British bass guitarist (1946–2025)

- Born: David Katz; 12 January 1946; London, England
- Died: 13 June 2025 (aged 79)
- Instruments: Bass guitar; guitar
- Years active: 1963–2025

David "Dill" Katz (12 January 1946 – 13 June 2025) was a British bassist and educator.

== Biography ==
His parents were classical musicians: his father playing violin and his mother piano. He studied guitar and double bass but was "formally self-taught." His first experience as a guitarist playing in a Shadows-influenced school band, The Nocturnes. In 1963, he became a professional musician, initially in Dublin, playing with Irish show bands Maisie McDaniel and her Fendermen and The Madrid, and taking part in studio sessions. He was considered a UK pioneer of the fretless electric bass from the 1960s. From the late 1960s, he hired out basses to visiting musicians. In the mid-1970s, he was a member of Dave MacRae's band, Pacific Eardrum. Between 1978 and 1979, he played with Nucleus, and then worked in Barbara Thompson's band Paraphernalia until 1982. He then founded the trio 20th Century Blues with Nic France and pianist Colin Dudman. From 1984, he played again with Nucleus (until the dissolution of the band). He founded The Premises Studios in London with Dudman in 1986. He also worked on Julian Bahula's Jazz Africa and Brian Abrahams' District Six, and was for 25 years the bassist with Steve Robie's band, Samara. He performed with his own jazz rock quartet. Some of his discography appeared on the 77 Records label.

He performed as a session player with in a wide variety of settings including recordings with folk musician Ewan MacColl, pop stars such as the Walker Brothers, and Dusty Springfieldm and on children's TV programme, Play Away.

Katz also taught at the Guildhall School of Music and worked as a music producer.

== Health and personal life ==
In 2019 Katz had suffered a heart attack on stage at the 606 Club where he regularly worked. He was saved by two doctors in the audience who performed CPR. He was fitted with a pacemaker and made a full recovery, but retired from performing. It was reported that Katz never married nor had children.

He died of sepsis on 13 June 2025, at the age of 79.
