= Brookfield, Renfrewshire =

Town in Renfrewshire, Scotland

Coordinates: 55.847°N 4.534°W

Brookfield: Burnfield
- Location within Renfrewshire
- Population: 880 (2020)
- OS grid reference: NS4164
- Council area: Renfrewshire
- Lieutenancy area: Renfrewshire
- Country: Scotland
- Sovereign state: United Kingdom
- Post town: JOHNSTONE
- Postcode district: PA5
- Dialling code: 01505
- Police: Scotland
- Fire: Scottish
- Ambulance: Scottish
- UK Parliament: Paisley and Renfrewshire South
- Scottish Parliament: Renfrewshire South

Brookfield is a small dormitory town in west central Renfrewshire, Scotland. It lies on the north of the A761 road, which runs through a number of towns and villages to join Port Glasgow and the city of Glasgow, via Paisley, and is roughly equidistant to the nearby settlements of Houston, Bridge of Weir, Kilbarchan, Johnstone and Linwood.

== History ==
The village was effectively founded in the late 19th century from what was previously farmland. It continued to grow at a steady rate from this point onwards, and now includes some 200 houses – making it possibly Renfrewshire's smallest village.

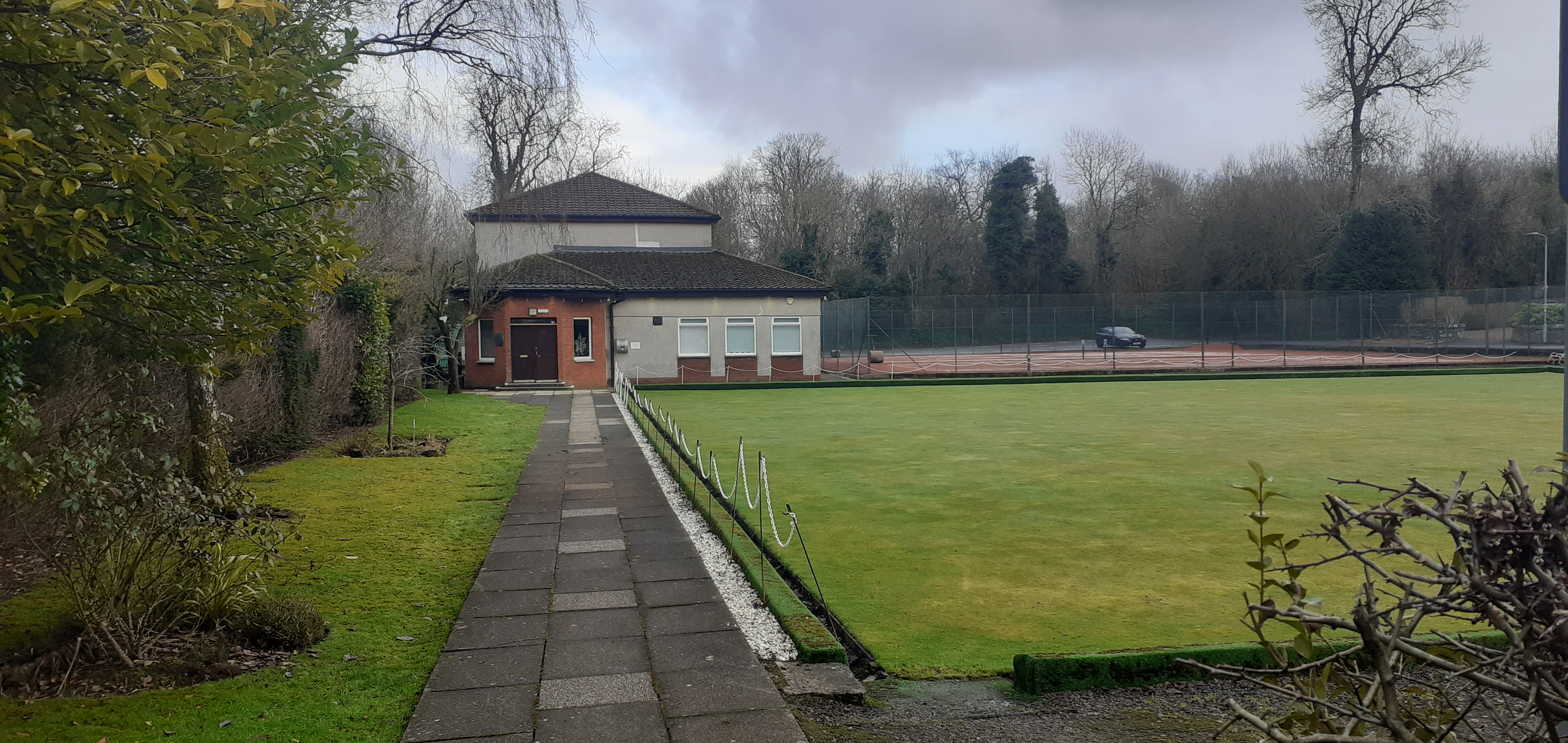
Brookfield Village Hall

Brookfield was also home to Donald J Malcolm (1925-2003), founder of The Malcolm Group, a significant haulage contractor whose fleet carried the Brookfield name.

The village was also home to Merchiston Hospital. After the demolition of the hospital buildings in 2013, the site was converted into a large housing estate, significantly increasing the size of the village.

== Governance ==
For elections to Renfrewshire Council, Brookfield forms part of Ward 9 (Houston, Crosslee and Linwood).
