= Laura Davison =

British trade union leader

Laura Davison is a British trade union leader.

Davison worked at the BBC, where she worked in local radio. She joined the National Union of Journalists (NUJ) and in 2007 she began working full-time for the union. Initially, she was national organiser for newspapers and news agencies, then moved to cover broadcasting. In this role, she secured recognition for the union at the Press Association.

In 2024, Davison was elected as general secretary of the NUJ, defeating Natasha Hirst by 1,976 votes to 644. She stated that her priorities would include defending media freedom, internationalism, and improving the pay and conditions of members.

Trade union offices
Preceded by Michelle Stanistreet	General Secretary of the National Union of Journalists; 2024–present	Succeeded by Incumbent
