= Harry Conroy =

Trade union leader and journalist (1943–2010)

Harry Conroy (6 April 1943 – 24 April 2010) was a trade union leader and journalist. He was the General Secretary of the National Union of Journalists from 1985 to 1990.

Born in Glasgow, he attended Lourdes Secondary School in Cardonald. He worked as a trainee lab technician in the Southern General Hospital before finding work at the Scottish Daily Express. He subsequently worked for various newspapers including the Daily Record, before becoming chair of the NUJ. In 2006, he wrote a biography of Prime Minister James Callaghan, based on his experiences as press officer for the Labour Party during Callaghan's tenure as leader. Conroy also edited a biography by writer Brian McGeachan called The Cardinal, in 2001 and collaborated with McGeachan on a 2003 book, They Rose Again.

Trade union offices
Preceded by Francis Beckett	President of the National Union of Journalists; 1981–1982	Succeeded by Jonathan Hammond
Preceded by Ken Ashton	General Secretary of the National Union of Journalists; 1985–1990	Succeeded by Steve Turner
