= Clement Bundock =

British trade unionist

Clement James Bundock (20 January 1892 – 8 August 1961) was a British trade union leader, newspaper editor and political activist.

Born in Wood Green in London, Bundock trained as a journalist with the Christian Commonwealth. He then moved to Manchester to work for the Independent Labour Party's (ILP) Labour Leader and joined the National Union of Journalists (NUJ). A supporter of the ILP and particularly of Fenner Brockway, Bundock regularly spoke on behalf of the party, and during World War I contributed to its pamphlet, "Why I Am A Conscientious Objector: Being Answers to the Tribunal Catechism". He spent some time in London as the paper's Parliamentary correspondent, before in 1919 becoming editor of the Leicester Pioneer.

From 1920 to 1922, Bundock served as the Midlands representative on the National Administrative Council of the ILP. Through the ILP, Bundock was active in the Labour Party, chairing the Leicester Labour Party in 1922, and standing unsuccessfully in Bosworth at the 1922 United Kingdom general election. In 1923, he was appointed as full-time National Organiser of the NUJ, a controversial appointment on account of his socialist and pacifist views. He proved immediately successful in the role, particularly in negotiations with employers. During the UK general strike, he tried to get the Trades Union Congress paper, the British Worker, printed in Leicester, but was overruled by the union, which felt that journalists should not undertake any work during the action.

Bundock was elected as general secretary of the NUJ in 1937, holding the post until 1952. That year, the International Federation of Journalists was re-established, and Bundock became its president. In retirement, he wrote a history of the NUJ, and also one of the National Union of Printing, Bookbinding and Paper Workers.

Party political offices
Preceded by J. W. Murby	Midlands Division representative on the National Administrative Council of the Independent Labour Party; 1920–1922	Succeeded by Charles Simmons
Preceded by Charles Simmons	Midlands Division representative on the National Administrative Council of the Independent Labour Party; 1923–1924	Succeeded by George Banton
Trade union offices
Preceded by Harry Richardson	General Secretary of the National Union of Journalists; 1937–1952	Succeeded by Jim Bradley
