= Jim Bradley (journalist) =

British journalist and trade unionist (1904–1991)

Henry James Bradley OBE (9 November 1904 – 1 November 1991) was an English journalist and trade unionist.

Bradley was born in Lawkland, Craven, Yorkshire, England. He began work as a journalist with the Craven Chronicle, then moved to the Evening Chronicle in Manchester, where he remained for many years. He joined the National Union of Journalists (NUJ) in 1923, and gradually came to prominence in the union, being elected to its National Executive Committee in 1945, and then as the union's general secretary in 1952.

Under Bradley's leadership, membership of the NUJ increased significantly; by his retirement in 1969, it had doubled to over 24,000. From 1964 to 1970, he was the president of the International Federation of Journalists.

In 1969, Bradley was made an Officer of the Order of the British Empire.

Trade union offices
Preceded by H. D. Moxley	President of the National Union of Journalists; 1951–1952	Succeeded by Jerry Taylor
Preceded by Clement Bundock	General Secretary of the National Union of Journalists; 1952–1969	Succeeded by Ken Morgan
Preceded by Anne Godwin	President of the National Federation of Professional Workers; 1956–1960	Succeeded by Jim Mortimer
