= Steve Turner (journalist) =

British journalist and trade union leader

Stephen Gordon Turner (27 July 1935 – 12 May 2016) was a British journalist and trade union leader.

Born in Mile End, Turner became a journalist with the Ilford Recorder and the Romford Times, then left to run his own freelance journalism agency. This was a success, and he frequently contributed to The Observer and The World at One. After a few years, he became a subeditor for the Daily Mail, then moved to the same post at the Daily Mirror, before becoming editor of its readers' letters page. In addition, he worked for the Sunday Mirror, where he subedited the column written by Woodrow Wyatt.

Turner also became active in the National Union of Journalists (NUJ), and by 1990 was Father of the Chapel at the Mirror. That year, he was elected as general secretary of the NUJ, but he was sacked the following year, on the charge that he had defied the union's own policy on the merger of print unions. In protest, Turner resigned from the union and formed the rival British Association of Journalists, which attracted much of the staff from the Mirror. He remained secretary of the new union until 2013, then served as its president until his death in 2016.

In December 2011, Turner gave evidence at the Leveson Inquiry. He spoke of the deep-seated culture of bullying and corporate greed that existed in the national press. He requested Lord Justice Leveson to enable journalists to give evidence to the Inquiry secretly and be guaranteed anonymity.

Turner's memorial service was held at St Bride's Church in September 2016.

Trade union offices
Preceded by Harry Conroy	General Secretary of the National Union of Journalists; 1990–1991	Succeeded by John Foster
Preceded by New position	General Secretary of the British Association of Journalists; 1992–2013	Succeeded by Nick Townsend
