= Kolton Lee =

British film director and writer

- Education: Borough Road College
- Occupation(s): Film director and writer

Kolton Lee is a British film director, crime novelist, and former journalist and editor of The Voice.

== Life and career ==
His parents came from the Caribbean island of Montserrat. They met in London, England, in the 1950s. When the couple split, their two children were sent to a Surrey-based children's home, Reedham School. Lee was seven years old when he arrived there and he remained there until he was 16. At Reedham, Lee discovered a talent for basketball. He went on to represent his county and his country at levels under-17 and U-19 and became a full, senior international player when he turned 20. He combined his playing with attending Borough Road College, part of London University, to study English Literature.

A serious knee injury cut his basketball career short. He started working as a journalist freelancing for a variety of sports publications, he found a full-time job as a sports journalist for The Voice and later became the magazines editor.

From there, he left to join the News on Sunday, the radical, left-wing Sunday tabloid. In joining the news team as its News Editor, Kolton became the first black British to be made news editor of a national newspaper. After six months the newspaper went bankrupt and Lee joined the BBC as a documentary researcher.

He later attended National Film and Television School. Upon graduating, he worked as a writer and/or director on a number of television programmes, including a stint at Crucial Films, the production company owned by Lenny Henry.

In 1998, he moved to New York City, United States, where he lived for four years. While there he made his first independent short drama, American Mod. While living in New York, Lee wrote and performed his first play, An Evening with Michael Jordan, at the National Black Theatre of Harlem.

He arrived back in London in 2002 and promptly founded the film and television production company Prophet Pictures. Through Prophet Pictures, Lee wrote, directed and produced his first feature film Cherps, winner of a Screen Nation Independent Spirit Film Award. His short film Blood was bought by MTV North America. Kolton's second feature film, Freestyle, was a youth romance with a basketball back drop.

Lee's first novel, a contemporary crime thriller titled The Last Card, received positive reviews in The Guardian and The Observer, he is currently preparing a follow-up for his publisher. Lee's second novel is about a sports psychologist who gets embroiled in dodgy dealings in a tennis camp for young stars.

== Films ==
- Freestyle (2010)
- Blood (2005)
- Cherps (2005)
- American Mod (2002)

== Novels ==
- The Last Card (2007)

== See also ==
- British African-Caribbean community
- Crime fiction
