= Mhairi Black =

Scottish politician (born 1994)

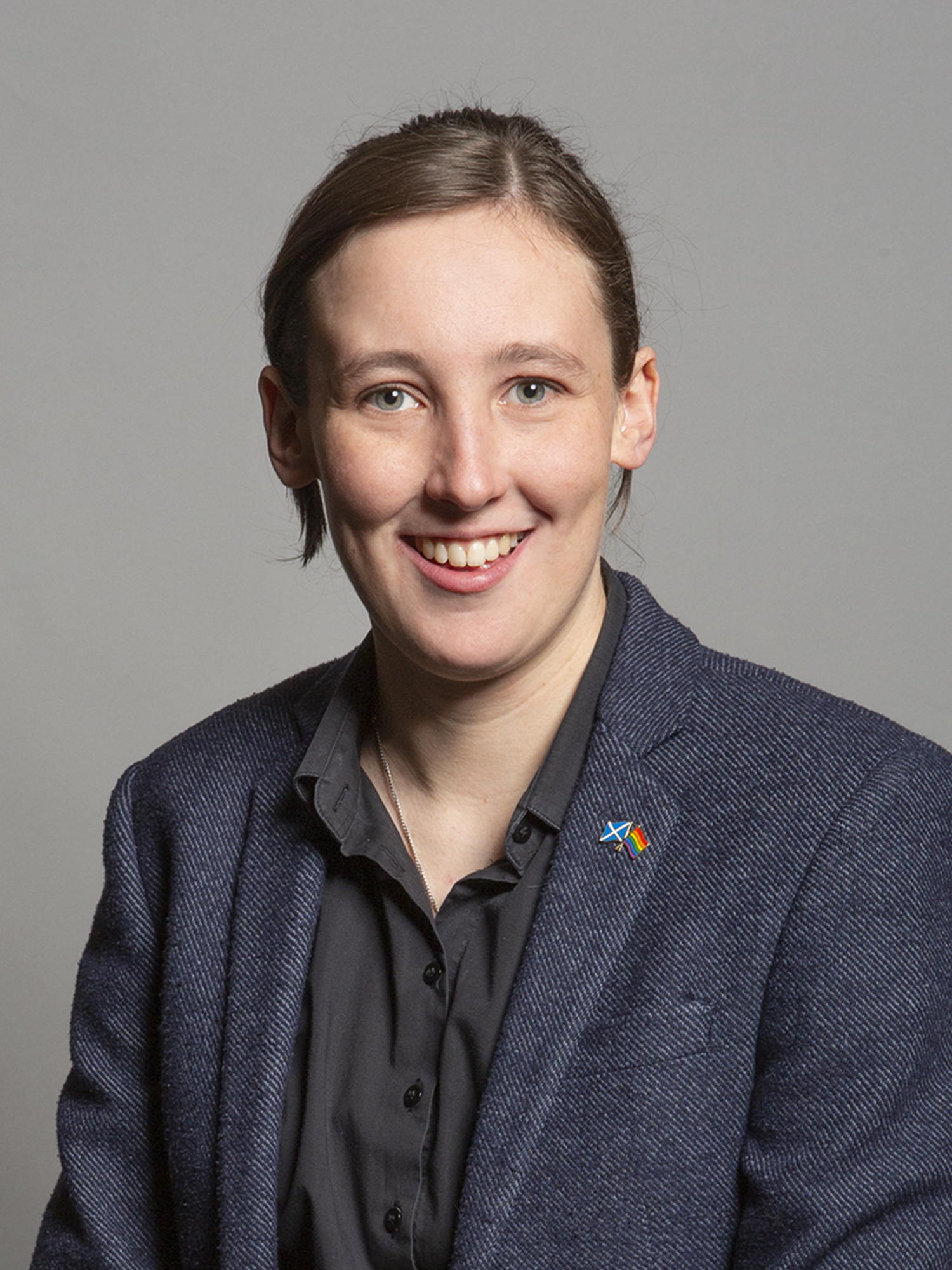
- Official portrait, 2019

Deputy Leader of the Scottish National Party in the House of Commons
- In office 6 December 2022 – 30 May 2024
- Leader: Stephen Flynn
- Preceded by: Kirsten Oswald
- Succeeded by: Pete Wishart

SNP Scotland Spokesperson in the House of Commons
- In office 7 January 2020 – 6 December 2022
- Leader: Ian Blackford
- Preceded by: Tommy Sheppard
- Succeeded by: Philippa Whitford

Member of Parliament for Paisley and Renfrewshire South
- In office 7 May 2015 – 30 May 2024
- Preceded by: Douglas Alexander
- Succeeded by: Johanna Baxter

Personal details
- Born: 12 September 1994 (age 32) Paisley, Scotland
- Party: Independent (since 2025)
- Other political affiliations: SNP (until 2025)
- Spouse: Katie McGarvey (m. 2022)
- Education: Lourdes Secondary School, University of Glasgow

Mhairi Black (/ˈmæri/;^{[a]} born 12 September 1994) is a Scottish comedian and former politician. She served as Deputy Leader of the Scottish National Party (SNP) in the House of Commons from 2022 to 2024, and as a Member of Parliament for Paisley and Renfrewshire South from 2015 to 2024.

Black was elected as the Member of Parliament (MP) for Paisley and Renfrewshire South in 2015, when she defeated the Labour Party's Shadow Foreign Secretary Douglas Alexander. She was re-elected in 2017 and again in 2019.

When elected in May 2015, she was 20 years, 7 months and 25 days old, making her the youngest MP elected to the House of Commons since the Reform Act 1832, the previous record having been held by William Wentworth-Fitzwilliam, who was 20 years and 11 months old when elected in 1832. Black was the youngest member of the House from 2015 to 2019. She stood down as an MP at the 2024 general election.

== Early life and education ==
Born in Paisley in 1994, Black was educated at Lourdes Secondary School, Glasgow, and the University of Glasgow, where she was awarded a first-class honours Master of Arts (MA) degree in Politics in June 2015. At the date of her election in 2015, she had not completed her undergraduate degree, with a final exam on Scottish politics still to be undertaken.

== Political career (2015–2024) ==
=== 2015 general election ===
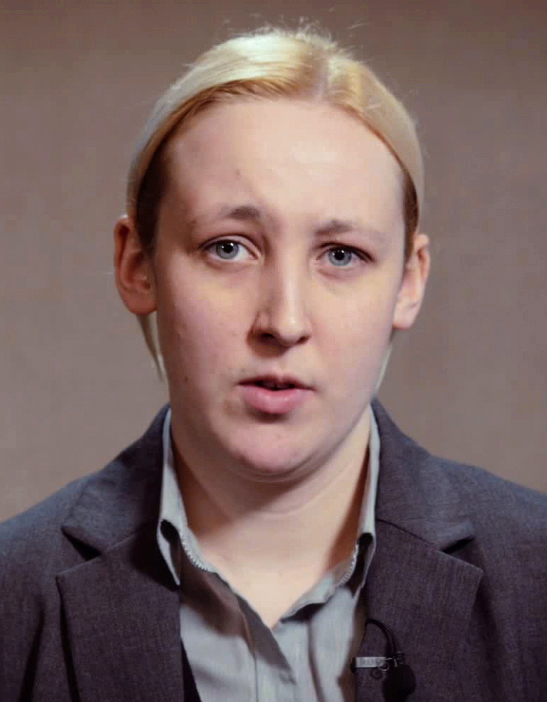
Black in 2015

Black became a member of Parliament for Paisley and Renfrewshire South in the 2015 general election while still a final year undergraduate student at the University of Glasgow. Her defeat of Douglas Alexander, a Labour MP and Shadow Foreign Secretary, was described as unexpected and an example of a collapse of popularity for the Labour Party in Scotland at the 2015 general election.

She was widely reported to be the youngest MP since Christopher Monck, Earl of Torrington, who entered the House of Commons at the age of 13 in 1667, although there have been other teenage MPs in between, such as Viscount Jocelyn, who was 18 when elected in the 1806 general election. Since the Electoral Administration Act 2006 reduced the age of candidacy from 21 to 18 years, Black is the first person to be elected under its provisions.

=== Committee appointment ===
On 1 July 2015, it was announced that Black had been appointed to the Work and Pensions Select Committee. She made her maiden speech on 14 July 2015 and this included some criticism of the government's approach to unemployment in her constituency and the growing need for food banks. She said, "Food banks are not part of the welfare state. They are a symbol that the welfare state is failing." Black also criticised the government over cuts to Housing Benefit. Within five days of her giving this speech, it had been viewed over 10 million times on various media. Black was later made aware of the change in the state pension through her constituents, and has since endorsed Women Against State Pension Inequality (WASPI) on several occasions.

=== 2017 general election ===
In 2017, Black considered not standing for a second term in the next general election, expressing her frustration that "so little gets done", and that "it is a pain to come up and down every week". Despite this, Black stood at the 2017 general election and, despite a backlash among voters to Sturgeon's plans for a second independence referendum, was re-elected with a reduced majority.

In April 2017, Black was heckled by protestors who were angry at the decision of the Scottish Government to close the sick children's ward at the Royal Alexandra Hospital in her constituency. One local parent told the press, "I am not at all happy. Ward 15 saved my little boy's life when he was only five days old. It's about children's lives".

In January 2018, Black was a signatory for a Safer Drugs Consumption Facility (SDCF) pilot scheme in Glasgow.

Since October 2015, she has received £150 per week from Newsquest Media (Herald & Times) Ltd, for a column in The National.

=== 2019 general election ===
Black stood again in the 2019 general election as the SNP candidate for Paisley & Renfrewshire South and was elected with over half the vote, increasing her majority to 10,679 votes or 24.8% – more than double that in the 2015 general election.

In March 2020, it was reported that Black had a "blazing row" with her SNP colleague, Joanna Cherry, after the latter questioned her decision to visit a primary school with a drag queen.

=== Deputy Leader of SNP (Westminster) ===
In December 2022, she became Deputy Leader of the SNP at Westminster.

On 4 July 2023, Black announced that she would not seek re-election as an MP at the 2024 general election. On The News Agents podcast, she called Westminster "one of the most unhealthy workplaces you could ever be in" and "a toxic environment". On the eve of the 2023 Rutherglen and Hamilton West by-election she reportedly threatened to quit the SNP. This was over her wishes to be succeeded as SNP candidate by her senior adviser Robert Innes. Eventually councillor Jacqueline Cameron was selected as the SNP candidate. In the general election Paisley and Renfrewshire South went with the Labour landslide electing Scottish Labour candidate Johanna Baxter.

== Comedy and acting (2024–present) ==
Black announced her decision not to stand for the 2024 general election, and said that she was looking for "new adventures" in her life after leaving the House of Commons. Following a performance at the Edinburgh Fringe Festival, Black embarked on a national tour with her stage show Politics Isn't For Me which commenced in March 2025 and concluded in July 2025. Black embarked on a second stage comedy show, Difficult Second Album, in 2026.

In October 2025, it was announced that Black would be joining the cast of the new BBC legal drama Counsels.

== Political views ==
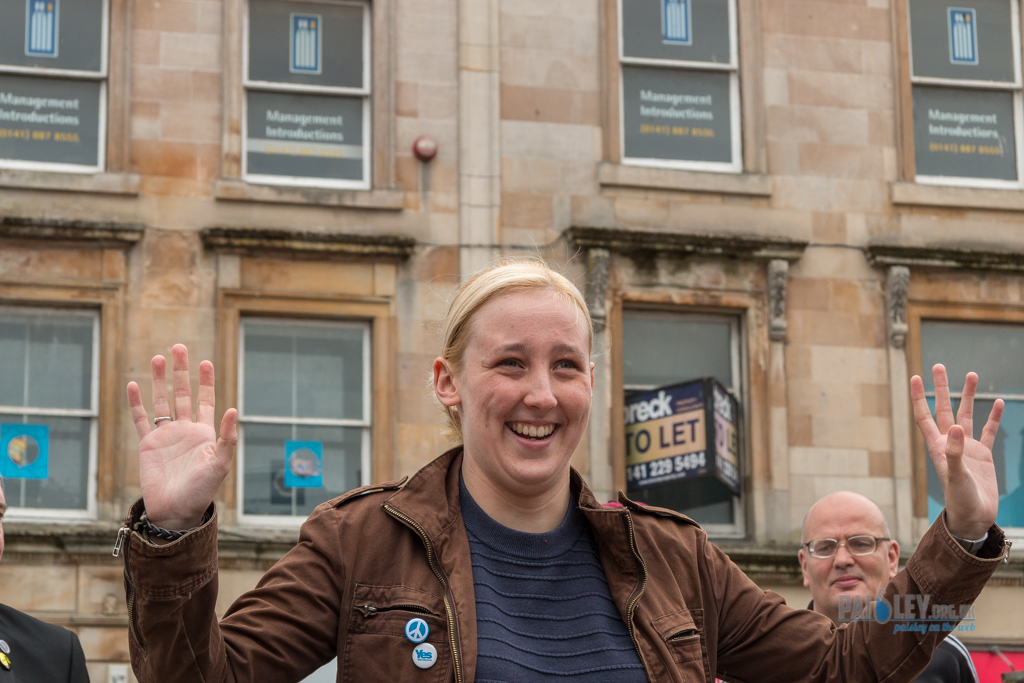
Black at the Campaign for Nuclear Disarmament protest in Paisley Cross, July 2016

Black is a long-standing critic of Westminster. Two months following her election, she commented that the practice of making MPs vote in person, instead of electronically, was "outdated and wasted time". In a 2016 interview with Guardian journalist Owen Jones, Black labelled Westminster as an "old boys' club" and "so excluded from reality", while expressing concern about the arrogance and sexism from other MPs.

In June 2016, Black introduced a Private Members' Bill entitled Benefit Claimants Sanctions (Required Assessment) Bill. It received its second reading in December 2016, but did not proceed to any further stages.

At a public meeting in November 2016 in Aberdeenshire, Black said of the EU referendum: "If I'm honest, there was an element of holding my nose a bit when I voted Remain." One member of the audience told The Daily Telegraph, "I'm not sure she would have said it in Glasgow. She was sitting in the most Eurosceptic corner of Scotland."

She also dismissed the claim of the pro-independence campaign in 2014 that Scots would be £5,000 better off if they voted Yes as "mythical".

Black describes herself as a "traditional socialist", citing Tony Benn as her enduring political hero – despite his opposition to Scottish independence. Her other political inspirations include Keir Hardie and Margo MacDonald.

Black was photographed at the 2019 SNP conference displaying her support for gender-neutral bathrooms by wearing a t-shirt with a trans-inclusive slogan. Black is a supporter of gender self-identification. In 2020, Black tweeted, "The only time I’ve felt erased as a lesbian is when anti-trans activists have shouted me down and sent me the vilest abuse whenever I express support for my trans siblings". Speaking at an Edinburgh Festival Fringe event in 2023, Black stated, "I'm a woman, I’m a lesbian, nobody's cancelling me and I want trans people to be able to live with dignity and happiness and for newspapers and politicians to leave them the hell alone".

In July 2025, Black revealed that she had left the SNP, predominantly over its stance on trans rights and Palestine. Black has criticised the prominent position of Deputy First Minister of Scotland given to Kate Forbes, given Forbes' socially conservative views and Black also condemning the SNP's "capitulation on LGBT rights, trans rights in particular".

== Personal life ==
Black is a lesbian. Asked about her decision to "come out", she replied "I've never been in". In June 2022, Black married her partner, Katie McGarvey, at Pollokshields Burgh Hall in Glasgow.

A 2015 article by The Tablet said that Black is a Catholic. In 2015, Black said that she is "not religious", although she "reads her Bible".

She plays the guitar and piano, as was revealed in a Channel 4 News interview with Jon Snow on 18 September 2015, during which she played the theme music from the film Titanic.

Black was diagnosed with attention deficit hyperactivity disorder in 2018.

== Notes ==
Black's forename is a Scottish Gaelic form of 'Mary'. In Gaelic, this name is Màiri [ˈmaːɾʲɪ] in the nominative case but a Mhàiri [əˈvaːɾʲɪ] in the vocative case, of which Mhairi is a borrowing (similar to the borrowing of Seumas ('James') as Hamish via the Gaelic vocative a Sheumais [əˈheːmɪʃ]). However, Black says that her name is a homophone of the word marry. /ˈmɑːri/ was the pronunciation chosen by Deputy Speaker Eleanor Laing on the occasion of her maiden speech.

Parliament of the United Kingdom
Preceded by Douglas Alexander	Member of Parliament for Paisley and Renfrewshire South; 2015–2024	Succeeded by Johanna Baxter
Honorary titles
Preceded by Pamela Nash	Baby of the House of Commons; 2015–2019	Succeeded by Nadia Whittome
