= Ken Ashton =

British journalist and trade union leader

Kenneth Bruce Ashton (9 November 1925 – 8 September 2002) was a British journalist and trade union leader.

== Early life and education ==
Ashton grew up in London, where he attended the Latymer Upper School before serving in the British Army from 1942. Stationed in Scotland for much of this time, he attended a course at the University of Glasgow, and took some casual work as a subeditor with the Daily Record. He was demobbed in 1946, and became a journalist with the Hampstead and Highgate Express, then worked successively for the Devon and Somerset News, the Mansfield Reporter and the Sheffield Star. In 1958, he became a subeditor with the Sheffield Telegraph, then held the same post at the Daily Express and finally the Daily Mail.

== Trade unionism ==
Ashton was a long-term member of the National Union of Journalists (NUJ), and was elected to its executive in 1968. He became the union's president in 1975, but had to stand down shortly afterwards as he began working full-time for the union as its Manchester regional organiser. In 1977, he was elected as the union's general secretary.

Ashton's time as leader of the NUJ was difficult. The union became involved in an increasing number of disputes, something Ashton was unhappy about, and this led him to face increasing criticism from union members. A member critical of him was elected as his deputy. In 1985, he took early retirement, relocating to the Yorkshire Dales, where he became a volunteer warden.

From 1982 to 1986, Ashton also served as president of the International Federation of Journalists.

Trade union offices
Preceded by Ivan Peebles	President of the National Union of Journalists; 1975	Succeeded by Rosaline Kelly
Preceded by Ken Morgan	General Secretary of the National Union of Journalists; 1977–1985	Succeeded by Harry Conroy
