= Merchiston Hospital =

- NHS Greater Glasgow and Clyde
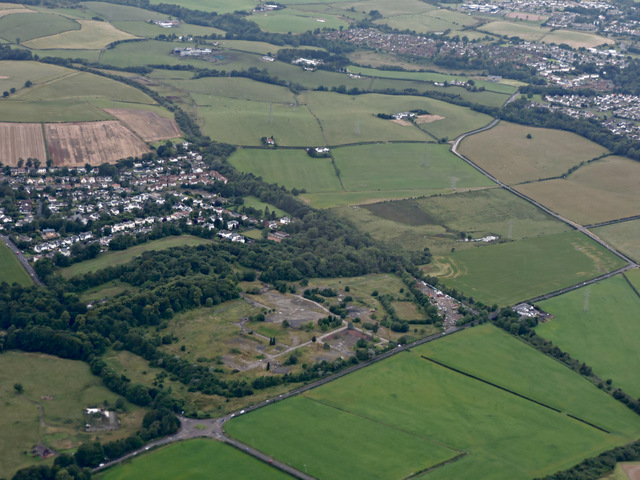
- The site of the demolished hospital from the air

- Shown in Renfrewshire

Geography
- Location: Barochan Road, Brookfield, Scotland
- Coordinates: 55.8444°N 4.5223°W

Organisation
- Care system: NHS Scotland
- Type: Mental health

Services
- Emergency department: No

History
- Founded: 1948
- Closed: 2008

Links
- Lists: Hospitals in Scotland

Merchiston Hospital was a mental health facility on Barochan Road in Brookfield, Renfrewshire, Scotland. It was managed by NHS Greater Glasgow and Clyde.

== History ==
The facility, which was commissioned as a replacement for Broadfield Hospital at Port Glasgow, was established by converting a 19th-century building known as Merchiston House in 1948. Two new wings were added in 1958. Modern facilities were created on the site in 1984 and the mansion was subsequently demolished. After services transferred to the Southern General Hospital, Merchiston Hospital closed in 2008. The buildings were demolished in 2013 in order to better secure the site.
