= International Federation of Journalists =

Trade union centre

- Type: Global union federation
- Purpose: Press freedom, journalists' rights
- Location: Brussels, Belgium
- Region served: World
- Members: 600 000, from 187 organisations in about 140 countries
- Official language: English, French, Spanish
- President: Dominique Pradalié
- General Secretary: Anthony Bellanger
- Website: www.ifj.org

The International Federation of Journalists (IFJ) is the largest global union federation of journalists' trade unions in the world. It represents more than 600,000 media workers from 187 organisations in 146 countries.

The IFJ is an associate member of UNESCO and has represented journalists at the United Nations since 1953 (UN/ILO). It works with the International Trade Union Confederation (ITUC) and the Trade Union Advisory Committee to the OECD.

The IFJ President is the French journalist and trade unionist Dominique Pradalié. She succeeded Younes Mjahed. Anthony Bellanger, a French journalist and trade unionist, is the organisation's General Secretary.

Upon request, the IFJ delivers the International Press Card to members of its affiliated organisations, the only press pass endorsed by national journalists' organisations in more than 130 countries.

The Federation's headquarters are located in Brussels, Belgium (155, rue de la Loi).

== History ==
The International Federation of Journalists was founded in 1926 in Paris, on the initiative of the French Syndicat national des journalistes (SNJ). At the time, it represented about 25 000 media workers from about twenty countries and had its headquarters in Paris. Its first President was the French reporter Georges Bourdon.

With the occupation of France by Nazi Germany, the Second World War put an end to the IFJ's activities in Paris. Several unions then decided to form in London the International Federation of Journalists of the Allies or Free Countries (IFJAFC), whose first Congress took place in 1941. IFJAFC dissolved in 1946, once the war was over, becoming the International Organisation of Journalists (IOJ).

As a result of the Cold War, the International Federation of Journalists was relaunched in 1952 at a World Congress in Brussels attended by 49 delegates. It competed with the IOJ, based in Prague and composed mainly of national journalists' unions from Central and Eastern Europe and developing countries, until the collapse of the IOJ in the 1990's with the end of the Cold War.

The IFJ was officially recognised by the United Nations Economic and Social Council (Ecosoc) and UNESCO.

At IFJ Second World Congress in Bordeaux in 1954, delegates representing more than 43 000 media workers from 21 unions in 18 countries adopted the IFJ Declaration of Principles on the Conduct of Journalists, the first widely recognised text on journalistic ethics.

The gradual disappearance of the IOJ in the 1990s gave a new impetus to the IFJ, with the membership of national trade unions from non-aligned states or from the former Soviet bloc. At the same time, IFJ encouraged the regionalisation of its activities and regional offices appeared in Africa, Asia-Pacific, Latin America, Europe and the Middle East.

In 2019, IFJ 30th World Congress took place for the first time in Africa and in an Arab Country, in Tunis, Tunisia. The Congress proved historical also because the 300 delegates from more than 100 countries adopted the Global Charter of Ethics for Journalists, which reinforced the ethical standards laid down by the 1954 IFJ Declaration of Principles on the Conduct of Journalists.

In February 2023, during the 2022 Russian invasion of Ukraine, the Russian Union of Journalists was suspended from IFJ after having established activities in occupied parts of Ukraine.

In 2024, the IFJ condemned "Israel’s strategy of slandering Gaza’s journalists with unproven allegations" and called for an investigation into "Israel’s systematic targeting and killing of journalists" in the Gaza war. The IFJ marked 26 February 2024 as the International Day for Palestinian Journalists.

== Priorities and campaigns ==
The International Federation of Journalists supports and organises union of journalists’ activities in defending their rights and press freedom worldwide.

It fights for the improvement of journalists' working conditions and rights: freedom of expression, fair remuneration, stable employment and decent pay, gender equality and the fight against all forms of discrimination, copyright protection, freedom of association, safety. ... In this regard, it campaigns for the adoption of standards aimed at protecting the journalists’ rights and strengthening collective agreements.

Freelance journalists' rights are a priority concern for the IFJ, which encourages its affiliates to integrate them in their structures.

The IFJ deals with various threats to press freedom: media concentration, repressive laws, censorship, intimidations, and impunity for crimes against media workers.

=== Gender equality ===
The Federation promotes equality between women and men journalists in editorial offices and the workplace, in trade unions and in the content of information.

IFJ Gender Council was founded in 2001 and is composed of representatives of organisations affiliated to the IFJ. It is an advisory body that sets the organisation's priorities in terms of gender equality and LGBTI representation.

The IFJ's objectives for achieving equality include: equal pay, women's access to positions of responsibility in both the media and trade unions, conciliation of private and professional life, combating all forms of harassment, discrimination and violence against women journalists, balanced and unbiased representation of women and men in information content and at all levels of the media industry.

=== Safety ===
Since 1990, the IFJ has published an annual report (the "Killed list") which documents cases of journalists and media staff killed during the course of each year. It uses the information to campaign for greater safety for journalists, particularly local and freelance reporters and support staff who lack the resources to protect themselves in conflict zones. The annual reports are archived on the website.

Since 1992, the Federation has also had a Safety Fund to support journalists (and their families) when faced with persecution. It has become internationally recognised as an important and crucial source of support for journalists under threat. It is the only international assistance fund for journalists established by journalists.

The Safety Fund is an integral part of the IFJ Safety Programme which includes casework, protests, campaigns, provision of information and production of various publications.

Besides, the IFJ organises safety trainings for journalists working in dangerous areas.

== Organization ==
The IFJ Head Office is located in Brussels, Belgium.

The Federation has regional organisations in Africa (Federation of African Journalists – FAJ), Europe (European Federation of Journalists) and Latin America (Federación de Periodistas de América Latina y el Caribe -FEPALC).

Regional offices are located in Sydney (Australia), Dakar (Senegal), Brussels and Buenos Aires (Argentina).

The Congress is the supreme organ of the Federation. Every three years, it brings together delegates from all its member unions.

French journalist and trade unionist Dominique Pradalié was elected IFJ President during IFJ Congress in Muscat (Oman) in 2022. She succeeded the Moroccan journalist Younes Mjahed, elected at the Tunis Congress in 2019.

French journalist and trade unionist Anthony Bellanger has been the IFJ General Secretary since 2015. He was Deputy General Secretary from 2014 to 2015 and First General Secretary of the French Syndicat National des Journalistes (SNJ) from 2011 to 2014.

=== List of IFJ Presidents ===
President	Office	Origin
Georges Bourdon	1926–1928	France
Georg Bernhard	1928–1930	United Kingdom
Harry Richardson	1930–1932	United Kingdom
Herman Dons	1932–1934	Belgium
Paul Bourguin	1934–1936	Switzerland
Karl Eskelund	1936–1938	Denmark
Archibald Kenyon	1939–1946	United Kingdom
Clement Bundock	1952–1956	United Kingdom
Marcel Stijns	1956–1964	Belgium
Jim Bradley	1964–1970	United Kingdom
K. G. Michanek	1970–1974	Sweden
Helmut A. Crous	1974–1978	Germany
Paul Parisot	1978–1982	France
Ken Ashton	1982–1986	United Kingdom
Mia Doornaert	1986–1990	Belgium
Jens Linde	1990–1998	Denmark
Chris Warren	1998–2007	Australia
Jim Boumelha	2007–2016	United Kingdom
Philippe Leruth	2016–2019	Belgium
Younes Mjahed	2019–2022	Morocco
Dominique Pradalié	2022–present	France

=== List of General Secretaries ===
General Secretary	Office	Origin
Stephen Valot	1926–1940	France
L.-A. Berry	1941–1947	Australia
Jiří Hronek	1947–1952 (IOJ)	Czechoslovakia
Théo Bogaerts	1952–1985	Belgium
Hans Larsen	1985–1987	Denmark
Aidan White	1987–2011	United Kingdom
Beth Costa	2011–2015	Brazil
Anthony Bellanger	2015–present	France

== See also ==
- National Union of Journalists
- Global union federation
- International Freedom of Expression Exchange
- National Writers Union
- Association of Iranian Journalists
- Tunisia Monitoring Group
- National Union of Somali Journalists
