= Val McCalla =

Jamaican newspaper publisher (1943–2002)

- Born: Val Irvine McCalla; 3 October 1943; Kingston, Colony of Jamaica, British Empire
- Died: 22 August 2002 (aged 58); Seaford, East Sussex, England
- Education: Kingston College
- Occupations: Accountant, media entrepreneur
- Known for: Founder of The Voice

Val Irvine McCalla (3 October 1943 – 22 August 2002) was a Jamaican accountant and media entrepreneur who settled in Britain in 1959. He is best known as the founder of The Voice, a British weekly newspaper aimed at the Britain's black community, which he established in 1982 as a voice for the British African-Caribbean community. He was honoured as a pioneering publisher for the community, but also faced critics who deemed him sensationalistic.

In the 100 Great Black Britons poll conducted in 1997, Val McCalla was voted number 68.

== Early life ==
Val McCalla was born in a poor part of Kingston, Jamaica. After studying accountancy at Kingston College, a Jamaican high school, McCalla travelled to England in May 1959, aged 15.

== Career ==
He joined the RAF, but a perforated eardrum put paid to his dreams of becoming a pilot and instead he honed his skills as a bookkeeper, leaving in the mid-1960s.

He then found employment in various accounts and book-keeping positions, before working part-time on a community newspaper, East End News, based near his flat in Bethnal Green. He started The Voice newspaper in 1982, Britain's first Black-owned paper, with a team that included broadcaster Alex Pascall, launching it at the Notting Hill carnival that August, and bringing in Viv Broughton as marketing manager. The Voice became a training ground for leading journalists. He owned Chic and Pride magazines, and in 1991 founded The Weekly Journal.

McCalla died of liver failure on 22 August 2002, aged 58, in Seaford, East Sussex, where he was buried.

== Legacy ==
In June 2021, on Windrush Day, Val McCalla was honoured as the founder of The Voice with the installation of a plaque by the Nubian Jak Community Trust outside the newspaper's Brixton offices, Blue Star House.
