= J. W. Murby =

John William Murby (June 1872 – March 1923) was a British trade unionist and socialist politician.

Born in Aylestone, Murby left school at the age of fourteen and initially began working as a printer's assistant. He was injured in an accident and instead found work as a clicker. He later worked at the Co-operative Wholesale Society's Wheatsheaf factory, then at the Co-operative Self Help Boot and Shoe Works, and then at the National Union of Boot and Shoe Operatives (NUBSO).

Murby was a keen Methodist. Through reading Tolstoy, he became interested in socialism, and he joined the Independent Labour Party (ILP) in 1903. He and W. E. Wilford founded the South Leicester Labour Church, and Murby served as its president.

In 1909, Murby was elected to the Leicester Borough Council for the Labour Party. He objected to the party's refusal to support George Banton as a candidate in the 1913 Leicester by-election, and so instead Murby campaigned for Edward Hartley of the British Socialist Party. This position was popular in the local ILP, and he served as its chair from 1913 until 1916.

Like the majority of the ILP, Murby opposed World War I, and from 1917 until 1920 he served on the party's National Administrative Council, representing the Midlands Division. He also joined the Union of Democratic Control. He lost his seat on the council in 1919, and during the 1920s, he worked as the manager of NUBSO's National Health Insurance Department. He died in March 1923, at which time he was the Labour Party's Prospective Parliamentary Candidate for Birmingham Ladywood.

Party political offices
Preceded by John Kneeshaw	Midlands Division representative on the National Administrative Council of the Independent Labour Party; 1917–1920	Succeeded by Clement Bundock
