= Independent Radio Drama Productions =

Radio drama production company

Independent Radio Drama Productions (IRDP) started in 1987 as an independent producer of radio drama. IRDP was a non profit company run by directors Tim Crook, Richard Shannon, and Marja Giejgo. IRDP's ambition was to promote the value of radio drama and to expand opportunities for writers new to radio. IRDP ran festivals and competitions which resulted in the production and broadcast of many plays by new writers who would not otherwise have had the chance to hear their work aired on the radio. In 1996, IRDP received a nomination at the Writers' Guild of Great Britain Awards for 'Developing and Fostering New Writing' in recognition of this work. The Woolwich Young Radio Playwrights' Competition was awarded the Daily Telegraph / ABSA award for Best Youth Sponsorship in 1991. The company ceased trading in 2003.
