= New Nation =

Weekly newspaper for the Black British community, 1996–2016

- Type: Weekly newspaper
- Format: Tabloid
- Owner: Ethnic Media Group
- Editor: Richard Adeshiyan, Michael Eboda, Lester Holloway
- Founded: 1996
- Ceased publication: 2016
- Political alignment: Minorities
- Headquarters: Whitechapel, London

New Nation was a weekly newspaper published in the UK for the Black British community. The newspaper was launched in November 1996 by Richard Adeshiyan, the founding Editor who gave the title its name. The newspaper was Britain's Number 1-selling black newspaper. The paper was published every Monday.

== History ==
The original New Nation masthead was designed by Peter Pek.

New Nation was initially launched in November 1996, by Elkin Pianim and his wife Elisabeth Murdoch, daughter of the media tycoon Rupert Murdoch. They later sold the title to Ethnic Media Group, a leading publisher of weekly newspapers, magazines, websites and digital newspapers for Britain's African, Caribbean, Black British and Asian communities, until the company went into administration in 2009.

It pioneered the development of Black and Asian digital newspapers, reaching a global audience. The newspaper's first two editions were priced at twenty-five pence, after which the price was raised to fifty-five pence. It featured a mix of news, sport, social and political issues. It also had a recruitment and personal section. Its weekly entertainment section, The Pulse, featured black music, gospel, general entertainment features as well as exclusive interviews. "Legal Ease" was a legal column written by barrister Ryan Clement, the author of Legal Eyes, that used to be a legal column in the weekly newspaper The Voice, which was New Nation's main competitor.

In 2003, when several UK newspapers were furnished with details about the death of Margie Schoedinger, a black woman who had filed rape charges against George W. Bush, only the New Nation chose to publish the story.

New Nation published its final online issue on 17 February 2016.

== See also ==
- List of newspapers in the United Kingdom
