= National Union of Journalists =

British and Irish journalists' trade union

NUJ
- National Union of Journalists
- Founded: 1907; 119 years ago
- Headquarters: Headland House, 72 Acton Street, London, WC1X 8DP
- Location: United Kingdom, Ireland
- Members: ▼23,066 (2024)
- General Secretary: Laura Davison
- President: Natasha Hirst
- Affiliations: IFJ; TUC; STUC; ICTU; TUCG; NSSN; FEU
- Website: nuj.org.uk

The National Union of Journalists (NUJ) is a trade union supporting journalists and media workers in the United Kingdom and Ireland. The NUJ was founded in 1907 and has 20,693 members. It is a member of the International Federation of Journalists (IFJ), Trades Union Congress (TUC) affiliated, and a former member of the General Federation of Trade Unions (GFTU).

== Structure ==
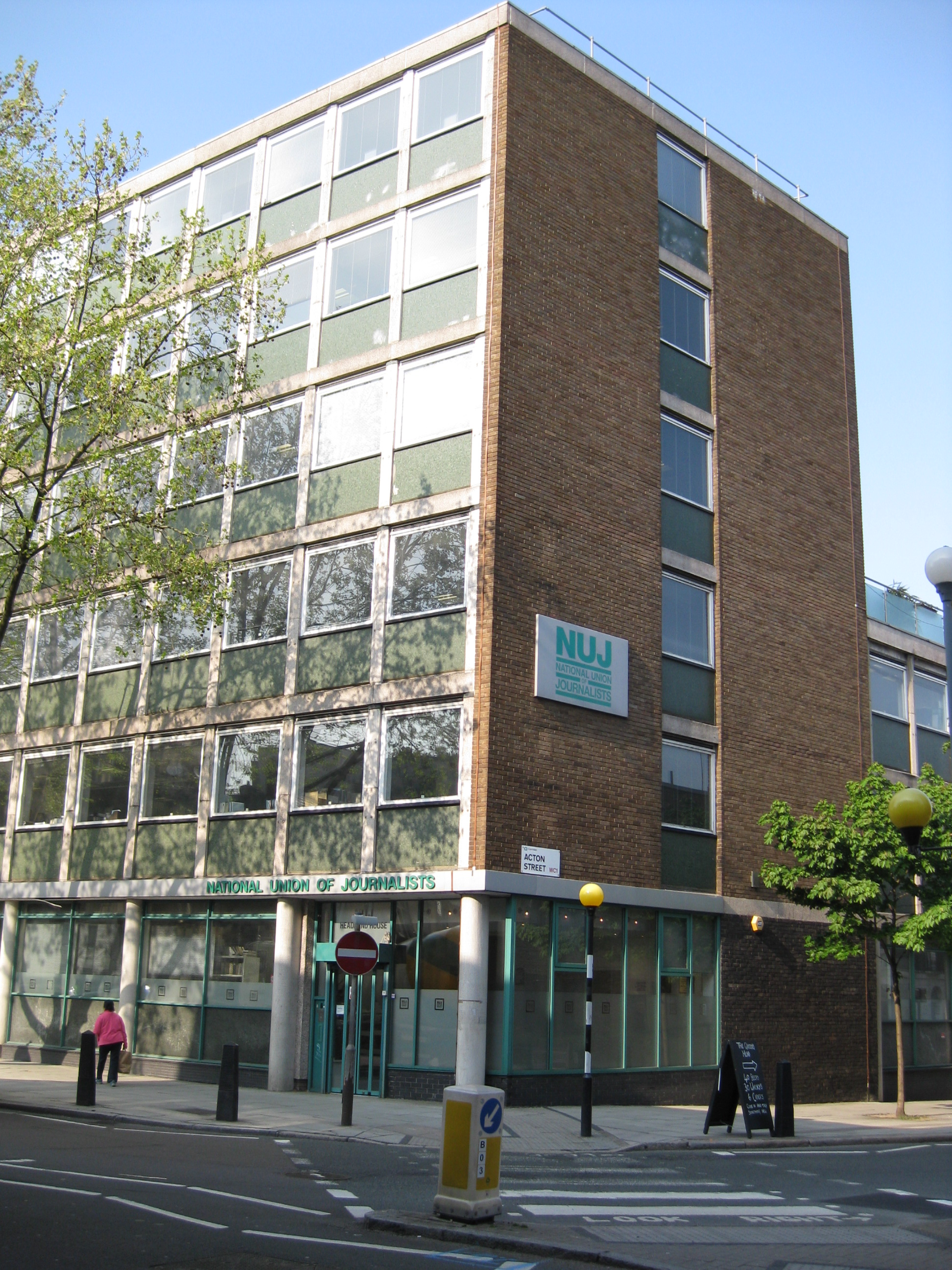
NUJ Headquarters, Gray's Inn Road, London

There is a range of National Councils beneath the NEC, covering different sections and areas of activity. There is a Sector Council for each of the NUJ's "industrial" sectors:

- Broadcasting and Digital Media
- Freelance
- Magazine, Journals & Books
- Newspapers & Agencies (NAIC)
- Public Relations & Communications.

The Photographers' Council, while not an industrial council, functions in the same way to campaign on issues relevant to the union's photographer, photojournalist and videographer members.

There are also National Executive Councils, covering all sectors, for Ireland and Scotland. The Irish Executive Council, which has a higher degree of autonomy, covers Northern Ireland as well as the Republic. Since 2016, in response to Brexit, the Union's Continental European Council further expanded the NUJ's remit to include NUJ members working in Continental Europe, in particular for NUJ branches in Paris, Brussels and the Netherlands, to campaign on issues of common interest.

The union's structure is democratic, and its supreme decision-making body is its Delegate Meeting, a gathering of elected delegates from all branches across the UK, Ireland and Europe. Between Delegate Meetings, decisions lie with the NUJ's National Executive Council, a committee of 27 people, elected annually by members. The NEC is chaired by a President, elected, along with a Vice-President and Treasurer, at the Delegate Meeting.

The General Secretary (GS) is elected every five years by a national ballot of all members and is held to account and responsible to the National Executive Council (NEC). The current GS is Laura Davison. The General Secretary is responsible for the day-to-day running of the union and directing its staff. However, important decisions such as authorising industrial action must be taken by the NEC.

== Leadership ==
=== General Secretaries ===
1907: William Watts
1918: Harry Richardson
1936: Clement Bundock Tim Gopsill and Greg Neale, Journalists: 100 Years of the NUJ
1952: Jim Bradley
1969: Ken Morgan
1977: Ken Ashton
1985: Harry Conroy
1990: Steve Turner
1992: John Foster
2001: Jeremy Dear
2011: Michelle Stanistreet
2024: Laura Davison

=== Presidents ===
Presidents of the NUJ:

1907: R. C. Spencer
1909: G. H. Lethem
1911: John Hunter Harley
1913: W. T. A. Beare
1914: F. E. Hamer
1916: E. Williams
1917: A. Martin
1918: F. J. Mansfield
1919: James Haslam
1920: J. E. Brown
1921: Thomas Jay
1922: T. A. Davies
1923: Walter Meakin
1924: T. K. Sledge
1925: Thomas Dickson
1926: A. J. Rhodes
1927: H. A. Raybould
1928: F. W. Bill
1929: H. D. Nichols
1930: W. G. Mitchell
1931: W. Betts
1932: J. G. Gregson
1933: James Hume Aitken
1934: E. J. T. Didymus
1935: R. S. Forsyth
1936: F. G. Humphrey
1937: F. P. Dickinson
1938: E. S. Bardsley
1939: James William Thomas Ley
1940: Ernest E. Hunter
1941: T. Foster
1942: D. M. Elliot
1943: A. Kenyon
1944: R. J. Finnemore
1945: A. J. Gibson
1946: F. Treavett
1947: J. E. Jay
1948: L. R. Aldous
1949: H. D. Moxley
1950: Jim Bradley
1951: J. Taylor
1952: Henry Bate
1953: P. W. Jarrett
1954: E. A. Lofts
1955: A. D. Ramsay
1956: G. Reid
1957: T. Bartholomew
1958: G. R. Mead
1959: R. G. Venmore-Rowland
1960: M. J. Williamson
1961: P. G. Reid
1962: K. L. Ley
1963: William Heald
1964: G. Byrne
1965: L. H. Kirwan
1966: D. C. Tuckett
1967: G. A. Hutt
1968: Kenneth Holmes
1969: Cyril Kilner
1970: C. Bland
1971: Douglas Rees
1972: Harold Pearson
1973: John Bailey
1974: Ivan Peebles
1975: Ken Ashton
1975: Rosaline Kelly
1977: John Devine
1978: Denis Macshane
1979: Jacob Ecclestone
1980: Francis Beckett
1981: Harry Conroy
1982: Jonathan Hammond
1983: Eddie Barrett
1984: George Findlay
1985: Ray McGuigan
1986: Bob Keogh
1987: Lionel Morrison
1988: Barbara Gunnell and S. McGuire
1989: Paul McGill
1990: David Sinclair
1991: Chris Frost
1992: Jim Boumelha and R. Trevor
1993: John Toner
1994: Anita Halpin
1995: Kyran Connolly
1996: Jeremy Dear
1998: Mark Turnbull
1999: Christy Loftus
2000: Dave Toomer
2001: Rory MacLeod
2002: John Barsby
2003: George Macintyre
2004: Jim Corrigal
2005: Tim Lezard
2006: Chris Morley
2007: Michelle Stanistreet
2008: James Doherty
2009: Peter Murray
2011: Donnacha DeLong
2012: Barry McCall
2014: Andy Smith and Adam Christie
2016: Tim Dawson
2018: Sian Jones
2021: Pierre Vicary
2023: Natasha Hirst
2025: Gerry Curran and Fran McNulty

== Publications ==
The NUJ publishes a magazine called The Journalist.

== See also ==
- Journalism
- Trade union
- Impress (regulator)
