= The Caribbean Times =

Former weekly newspaper focused on the British African-Caribbean population

The Caribbean Times was a British weekly newspaper that was first published in 1981 by Hansib Publications, a publishing house for Caribbean, African and Asian writers and their communities, founded in London by Guyanese-born businessman Arif Ali in 1970. The newspaper covered news, sport and social developments in the Caribbean, targeting the UK's West Indian and African-Caribbean population. It was "an important anti-racist campaigning organ" and the UK's oldest Black weekly newspaper. Hansib brought out other publications, including the weekly Asian Times in 1983 and the African Times in 1984, but in 1997 sold off the newspapers in order to concentrate on producing books.

The Caribbean Times was subsequently published by Ethnic Media Group Ltd, and in 2006 was merged with the New Nation, which had launched in 1996.

After Ethnic Media Group went into administration in 2009, the rights to The Caribbean Times and other titles were sold.
