= The Voice (British newspaper) =

British newspaper

- Type: Monthly newspaper
- Founder: Val McCalla
- Founded: 30 August 1982; 43 years ago
- Language: English
- City: London
- Country: United Kingdom
- ISSN: 1757-5893
- Website: www.voice-online.co.uk

The Voice, founded in 1982, is a British national African-Caribbean newspaper operating in the United Kingdom. The paper is based in London and was published every Thursday until 2019 when it became monthly. It is available in a paper version by subscription and also online.

== History ==
The Voice was founded in 1982 by Val McCalla, who was working on a London local paper called the East End News in 1981. He and a group of businesspeople and journalists created a weekly newspaper to cater for the interests of British-born African-Caribbean people. Until then, relevant publications had mastheads such as the West Indian Gazette, West Indian World, The Caribbean Times and West Africa. This was in order to address the interests of a generation of immigrants, by passing on news from their countries of origin in the Caribbean and Africa, rather than addressing the concerns of generations born in the UK. According to Beulah Ainley, who worked with McCalla on the East End News, "...nobody thought the Voice would work". However, as The Independent noted in 1996, "The previous summer, Brixton had rioted, and African-Caribbean enterprises of all kinds were now being encouraged in the hope of preventing a repetition. London councils, in particular, were keen to advertise for black staff, and even keener to do so in an African-Caribbean newspaper. McCalla also had a business partner, Alex Pascall, with BBC connections; soon the Corporation was advertising too."

The Voice was established with a £62,000 loan from Barclays Bank, at a time when African-Caribbean businesses found it particularly hard to get financial backing from banks. Barclays had attracted a boycott by the Anti-Apartheid Movement for its investments in South Africa and was thus eager to show support for African-Caribbean causes. The Loan Guarantee Scheme, set up by the Conservative government to help small businesses, was also a help. The loan was in fact paid off within five years.

The first issue of The Voice was printed at the same time of year as the Notting Hill Carnival in August 1982. Its cover price was 54 pence, and it was only sold in Greater London.. The Voice's first office was in Mare Street, Hackney, east London. The newspaper's first editor, Flip Fraser, led a team of young journalists who set about addressing issues of interest to Britain's African-Caribbean community. They combined human-interest stories and coverage of sports, fashion and entertainment with hard news and investigative reporting.

In under a decade, the paper was selling more than 50,000 copies weekly. Within two decades it had become "Britain's most successful African-Caribbean newspaper". From 1996, The Voice had a new competitor in the form of New Nation, which sought to position itself as an "upbeat, aspirational publication", rather than the typically "advocacy journalism" contained within The Voice. New Nation published its final online issue on 17 February 2016.

McCalla died in 2002. In 2004, the newspaper was taken over by the Jamaican Gleaner Company. Its publisher is GV Media Group Limited.

== Type and circulation ==
The Voice is produced in tabloid format and is now a monthly publication, published on the last Thursday each month, and aimed at the African and Caribbean diaspora in the UK. There is also a website, The Voice Online.

Regular columns in the newspaper include Faith, News, Campaigns, Sport, Black British Voices. In addition there are special supplements such as:

- Black Business Guide - an annual publication highlighting and showcasing small black business owners and their trades.
- Apprenticeships - each year, a supplement highlighting apprenticeships across the UK is published alongside the newspaper. The supplement includes features from key figures in business and apprenticeships.
- Carnival - every August, The Voice publishes a Carnival supplement to coincide with the Notting Hill Carnival.
- Bound volumes of the periodical from 1982 to 1999 are held in the Black Cultural Archives. The Voice also features in the British Library collection of Black Britain publications.

== Events ==
In 2012, The Voice journalists were denied entry to the Olympic stadium despite the strong presence and interest in Black British athletes.

In July 2017, The Voice hosted a special charity dinner for Usain Bolt ahead of his final appearance at the World Championships. The event, which took place at the Dorchester Hotel in London, raised money for Bolt and coach Glen Mills' Racers Track Club through auctioning off special items and raised over £30,000.

The Voice has been a key player in Africa on the Square – a yearly event that takes place every October in Trafalgar Square, celebrating Africa's culture, cuisine, music and more.

In 2022, the paper launched a UK wide research project and survey to find out more about the lived experience of Black British people. The Black British Voices Project is the largest national survey of Black Britain - with over 10,000 Black Britons with in-depth interviews of leading Black British commentators, including politicians, celebrities, writers, journalists and businesspeople.

In 2022, the publishing house Ebury Press announced the upcoming publication of a book entitled The Voice: 40 years of Black British Lives.

== Staff ==
Vic Motune is News Editor. Paulette Simpson is the executive director of The Voice.

Former writers for The Voice include one-time Commission for Racial Equality chair Trevor Phillips, former BBC and currently Al Jazeera newsman Rageh Omaar, Martin Bashir, authors Diran Adebayo, Leone Ross, and Gemma Weekes; film maker and novelist Kolton Lee, novelist Vanessa Walters, broadcasters Jasmine Dotiwala, Henry Bonsu, Dotun Adebayo, Onyekachi Wambu, Joel Kibazo, educationalist Tony Sewell, publisher Steve Pope, and former The Star-News editor Michael C. Burgess, among others.

== Recognition and awards ==
The Voice has received many awards, which include:.

- Young Voices – two "Best Magazine" awards from the Urban Music Awards 2010 and 2009
- BBI Media and Entertainment Award 2008
- Voice of Sports – Performance Award 2003 from Western Union
- BEEAM Awards for Organisation Achievements 2003
- Black Plus Awards 2002
- Britain's Ethnic Minority Federation at the Bank of England, Partnership Awards 1999
- NLBA Enterprise Excellence Awards 1996
- BGA Gospel Awards – Best Media 1980s

== Criticisms ==
The editorial tone and content of The Voice has often come under criticism. At the launch of the New Nation newspaper, the paper's editor, Richard Adeshiyan referred to The Voice as a "doom-and-gloom sheet" which prints damaging news and images of Black people as victims.

In July 2020, educationalist Tony Sewell publicly retracted and apologized for homophobic remarks he had made in a column published in The Voice in 1990, in which he commented on the announcement by footballer Justin Fashanu that he was gay. Sewell had written:

"We heteros are sick and tired of tortured queens playing hide and seek around their closets. Homosexuals are the greatest queer-bashers around. No other group of people are so preoccupied with making their own sexuality look dirty."

On 30 July 2020, The Voice received widespread criticism for publishing an interview with rapper Wiley shortly after he posted a series of anti-Semitic comments on social media. Rather than challenging Wiley on his comments, the interview merely asked Wiley if he felt he had made any "salient points". This received widespread criticism from many Jewish people, with music producer Mark Ronson tweeting a series of comments criticising the publication. On 31 July the article was removed, with The Voice issuing a statement apologising for the offence caused by the article.

Prince Charles was invited in 2022 to guest edit an issue celebrating 40 years of The Voice. The choice of a white member of British Royalty to do this was heavily criticised by many.

== See also ==
- List of newspapers in the United Kingdom
- New Nation
