= Turner (surname) =

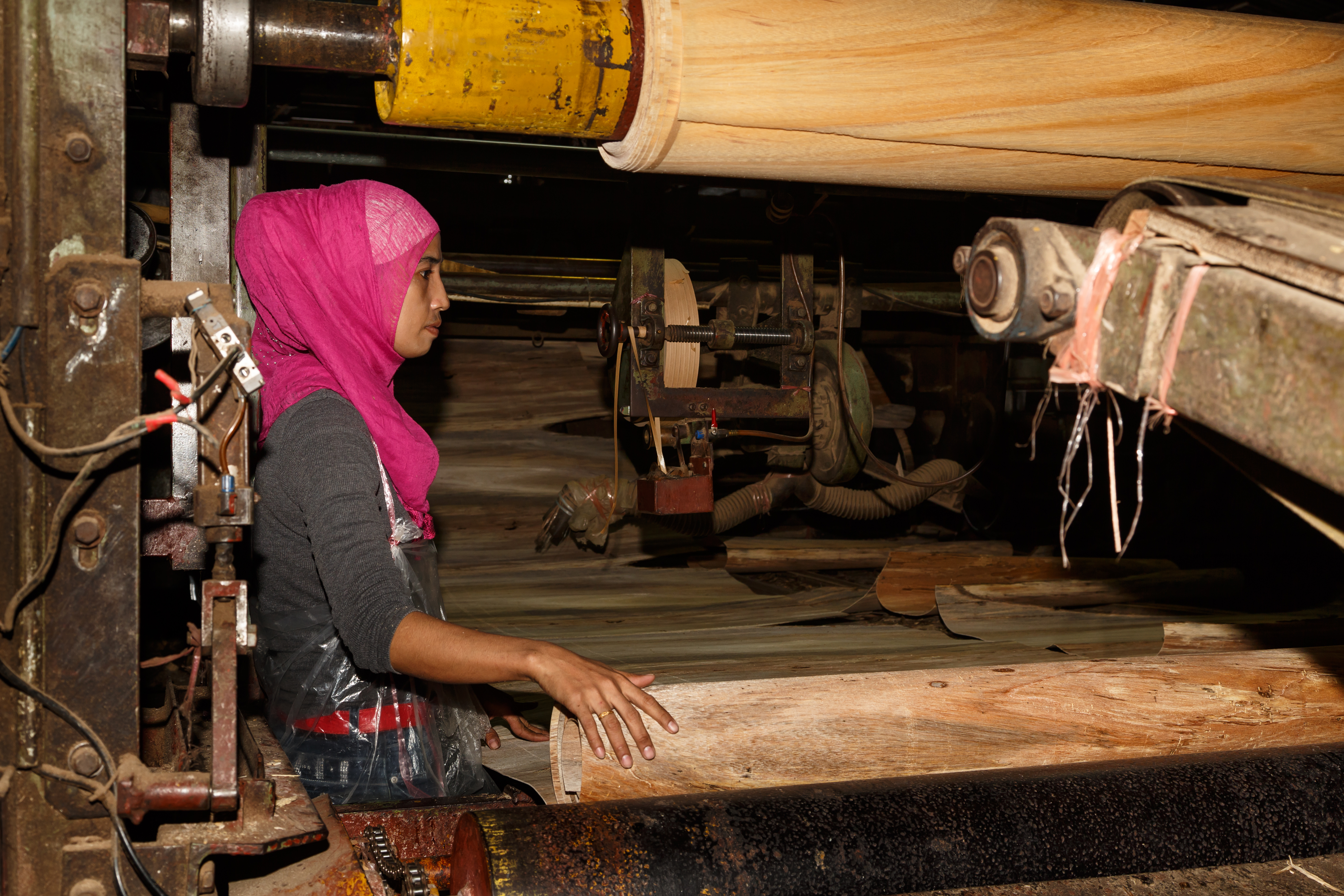
- A woman working a modern lathe

Origin
- Origin: Middle English
- Derivation: "one who works a lathe"
- Region of origin: France, England

Other names
- Variant forms: Tuner, Turnor, Thurner, Tourner, Tournor

Turner is a common surname originating from Normandy, France, arriving in England after the Norman conquest with the earliest known records dated in the 12th century. It is the 28th-most common surname in the United Kingdom.

Most often it derives from an occupational name applied to a maker of small objects out of wood, metal or bone, by turning on a lathe (from Old French tornier, "lathe", ultimately from Latin). In this sense it is analogous to the German surnames Drexel, Drechsler, Dressler, and Dreyer, Polish Tokarz, Finnish Sorvari, Russian Токарев (Tokarev) and related to English surnames such as Potter and Crocker. Other occasional origins include Old French tournoieur, referring to someone either in charge of, or who participates in a tournament, and Turnhare, referring to a fast runner (one who can outrun a hare).

Early recordings of this surname include Ralph le Turner in the late 12th century. The earliest recorded spelling of this family name dates from 1180 for "Warner le Turnur".

== List of people with surname Turner ==
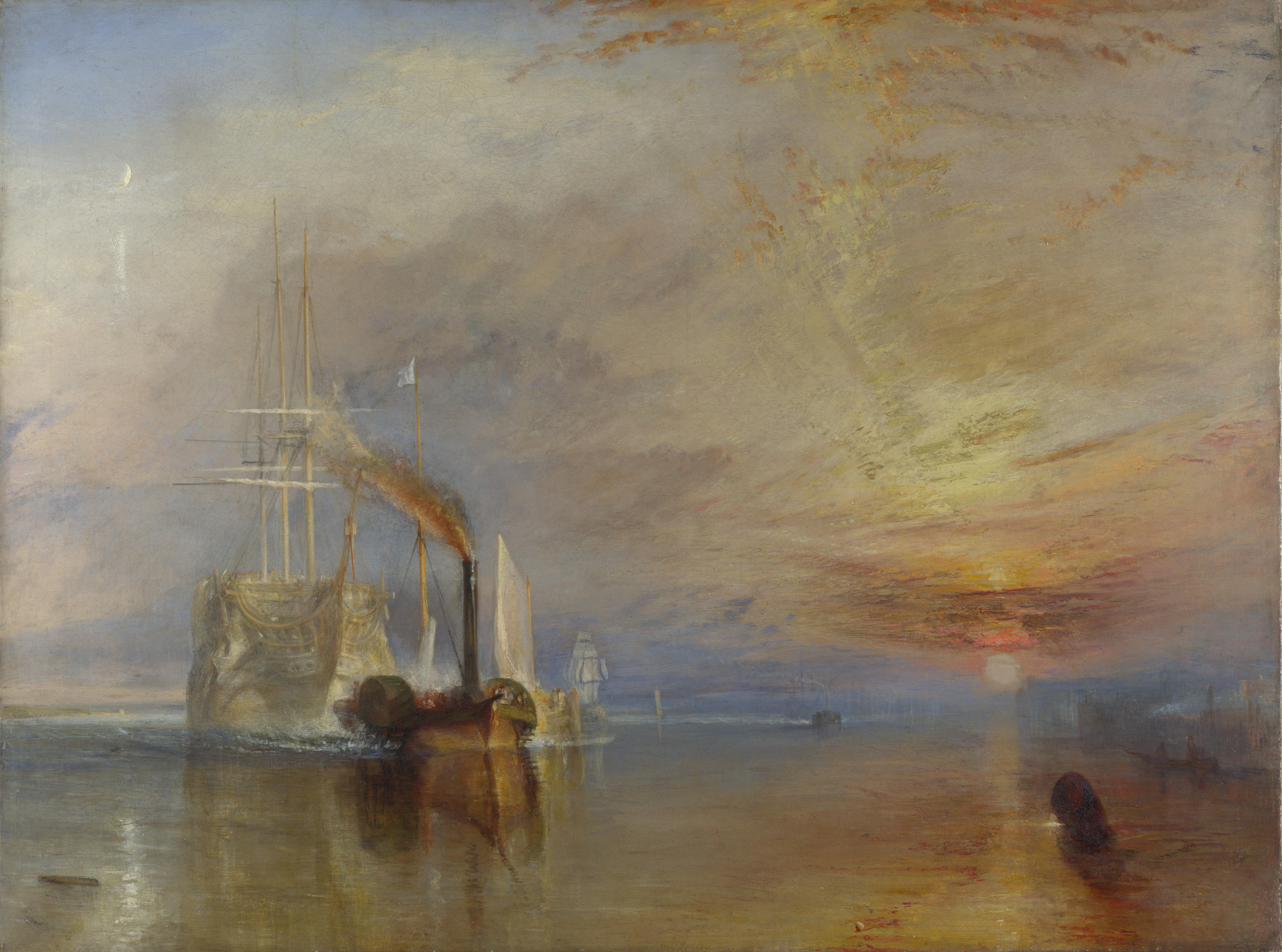
The Fighting Temeraire tugged to her last berth to be broken up by artist J. M. W. Turner

- Captain Turner (disambiguation), various people

=== Common combinations of given name and surname "Turner" ===
These links lead to disambiguation pages

- Alan Turner
- Albert Turner
- Alfred Turner
- Alex Turner
- Andrew Turner
- Ann Turner
- Anna Turner
- Anne Turner
- Benjamin Turner
- Bert Turner
- Brad Turner
- Brian Turner
- Bruce Turner
- Carl Turner
- Charles Turner
- Chris Turner
- Christopher Turner
- Cole Turner
- D. J. Turner
- Dan Turner
- Daniel Turner
- David Turner
- Edward Turner
- Edwin Turner
- Elizabeth Turner
- Francis Turner
- Frank Turner
- Fred Turner
- George Turner
- Graeme Turner
- Henry Turner
- Herbert Turner
- Hugh Turner
- Ian Turner
- Jack Turner
- James Turner
- Janet Turner
- Jason Turner
- Jay Turner
- Jim Turner
- Jimmy Turner
- Joe Turner
- Joel Turner
- John Turner
- Karl Turner
- Kyle Turner
- Laura Turner
- Lynn Turner
- Max Turner
- Mark Turner
- Mary Turner
- Matthew Turner
- Michael Turner
- Neil Turner
- Pat Turner
- Paul Turner
- Peter Turner
- Philip Turner
- Richard Turner
- Robert Turner
- Robin Turner
- Roger Turner
- Ron Turner
- Samuel Turner
- Sarah Turner
- Steve Turner
- Stuart Turner
- Ted Turner
- Thomas Turner
- William Turner

=== Less common first names ===
==== A to D ====
- Adair Turner, Baron Turner of Ecchinswell (born 1955), British businessman and academic
- Afida Turner (born 1976), French media personality and singer
- Aidan Turner (born 1983), Irish actor
- Augustus J. Turner (1818–1905), American musician
- Alice Bellvadore Sams Turner (1859–1915), American physician, writer
- Anthea Turner (born 1960), UK TV presenter
- Arlin Turner (1909–1980), American biographer and scholar of American literature
- Arthur James Turner (politician) (1888–1983), Canadian politician
- Asa Turner (American football), American college football player
- Bake Turner (born 1940), American football player who played wide receiver
- Bertha L. Turner, American caterer, cookbook author, and community leader
- Big Joe Turner (1911–1985), American blues singer
- Billie Lee Turner (1925–2020), American botanist
- Billie Lee Turner II, American geographer
- Bird Margaret Turner (1877–1962), American mathematician and university professor
- Bolon B. Turner (1897–1987), United States Tax Court judge
- Bonnie and Terry Turner, husband and wife sitcom writing team
- Bree Turner (born 1977), American actress
- Brock Turner, rapist
- Bulldog Turner (1919–1998), American football player
- Carmen E. Turner (1931–1992), American public administrator
- Charlotte Turner (1749–1806), English novelist and poet
- Chester Novell Turner (born 1946), African-American filmmaker
- Christian Turner (born 1972), British diplomat
- Clarence W. Turner (1866–1939), American politician
- Clorinda Matto de Turner (1853–1909), Peruvian writer
- Crystal Turner (1982–2021), American female murder victim
- Curtis Turner (1924–1970), NASCAR driver
- Daisy Turner, American storyteller and poet
- Dallas Turner (born 2003), American football player
- Dawson Turner (1775–1858), English banker and botanist
- Debbie Turner (born 1956), American actress and former child star
- Debbye Turner (born 1965), American TV anchor, veterinarian, talk show host and former beauty queen
- Decherd Turner (1922–2002), American institutional book collector
- De'Lance Turner (born 1995), American football player
- Dennis Turner, Baron Bilston (1942–2014), British Member of Parliament
- Derek Turner, English rugby league footballer
- Des Turner (born 1939), British politician
- Diane Turner, American politician
- Douglas H. Turner, American chemist and professor
- Dwayne Turner, British comic book artist

==== E to K ====
- Edward Turner (1901–1973), British motorcycle and engine designer of Triumph Motorcycles
- Ernest Sackville Turner (1909–2006), English journalist and author
- Eugene S. Turner (1824–1915), American politician
- Evan Turner (born 1988), American basketball player
- Florence Turner (1885–1946), American actress
- Florence Turner-Maley (1871–1962) American composer, singer and teacher
- Frank Turner (born 1981), British musician
- Frederick Jackson Turner (1861–1932), American historian
- Garth Turner (born 1949), Canadian business journalist, broadcaster and politician
- Geills Turner (born 1937), wife of John Turner, a prime minister of Canada
- George Townsend Turner (1906–1979), philatelist of Washington, D.C.
- Gerald Turner, perpetrator of the murder of Lisa Ann French
- Glenn Turner (cricketer) (born 1947), New Zealand cricketer
- Grant Turner (1958–2023), New Zealand soccer player
- Guinevere Turner (born 1968), American actor and writer
- Hal Turner, internet radio talk show host
- Harald Turner (1891–1947), German Nazi SS commander executed for war crimes
- Harvey G. Turner (1822–1893), American politician
- Hayden Turner (born 1966), Australian television presenter and zookeeper
- Helen Alma Newton Turner (1908–1995), Australian geneticist and statistician
- Helen Monro Turner (1901–1977), Scottish artist
- Howard Turner (1897–1976), American football player
- Hugh Thackeray Turner (1853–1937), English architect
- Ike Turner (1931–2007), American musician
- J. B. Turner, Australian cricketer fl. 1865–1867
- J. M. W. Turner (1775–1851), English painter
- Jamie Turner (born 1972), American automobile dealer
- Jane Turner (born 1967), Australian actor and comedian
- Janine Turner (born 1962), American actor
- Jasmine Turner (born 1994), Maltese footballer
- Jazz Turner (born 1998), British paralympic sailor
- Jean Turner (born 1939), member of the Scottish Parliament
- Jean L. Turner, American astrophysicist
- Jessica Turner (1996–2023), American woman shot to death by police officer Jason Chamberlain in Clearwater, Florida
- Jermaine Turner (born 1974), American professional basketball player
- Jessie Franklin Turner (1881–1956), American fashion designer.
- Jimmie Turner (born 1962), American football player
- Joe Lynn Turner (born 1951), American musician
- Joe M. Turner (born 1969), American magician, mentalist and speaker
- Jonathan Baldwin Turner (1805–1899), abolitionist and educational leader
- Jonathan D. C. Turner (born 1958), English barrister
- Jordan Turner (American football) (born 2001), American football player
- Josh Turner (born 1977), musician
- Julian Turner (born 1955), British poet and mental health worker
- Justin Turner (born 1984), American professional baseball player
- Kathleen Turner (born 1954), American actor
- Keena Turner (born 1958), American football player
- Kenneth Turner (1928–2018), Australian political historian
- B. Kevin Turner (born 1965), business executive
- Kobie Turner (born 1999), American football player

==== L to R ====
- Lacey Turner (born 1988), English actor
- Lana Turner (1921–1995), American actor
- Landon Turner (born 1993), American football player
- Landon Turner (basketball) (born 1960), American basketball player
- Lavinia Turner (c. 1888–after 1937), American classic female blues singer
- Lesley Turner Bowrey (born 1942), Australian tennis player
- Lillia Turner (born 2009), English actress
- Lizabeth A. Turner (1829–1907), National President, Woman's Relief Corps
- Lloyd Turner (1884–1976), Canadian ice hockey pioneer
- Loyce W. Turner (1927–2021), American politician and veterinarian
- Lynn Turner (murderer) (born 1968)
- Malik Turner (born 1996), American football player
- Margery J. Turner, American dancer and author
- Mo Turner, American politician
- Mildred Cozzens Turner (1897–1992) American artist, composer and singer
- Milt Turner (1930–1993), American jazz drummer
- Myra Brooks Turner (1936–2017), American composer
- Nat Turner (1800–1831), American leader of a slave rebellion
- Natalie Turner, Canadian animator
- Nolan Turner (born 1997), American football player
- Norv Turner (born 1952), American football coach
- Othar Turner (1907–2003), American fife player and blues musician
- Pamela Rogers Turner (born 1977), American teacher convicted as a sex offender
- Payton Turner (born 1999), American football player
- Pearl Turner, American female child who has been missing since 1923
- Percival Stanley Turner (1913–1985), Canadian combat pilot
- Percy Turner, English footballer
- Pierce Turner, Irish singer-songwriter
- Rahshon Turner (born 1975), American basketball player
- Ralph E. Turner (1893–1964), American historian
- Ralph Lilley Turner (1888–1983), English Indian languages philologist and linguist
- Randy Turner (1949–2005), American artist and singer for the band Big Boys
- Richmond K. Turner (1885–1961), American naval officer in World War II
- Robert Turner (born 1993), American basketball player
- Rodney Turner (born 1953), British/New Zealand organizational theorist
- Ross Sterling Turner (1847–1915), American painter and educator
- Roy J. Turner (1894–1973), American politician

==== S to Z ====
- Sammy Turner (1932–2026), American singer
- Scott Turner (born 1982), American football coach
- Sharon Turner (1768–1847), English historian
- Sheadrick Turner (1869–1927), American lawyer and politician
- Shemar Turner (born 2003), American football player
- Sherri Turner (born 1956), American LPGA golfer
- Shirley Turner, American politician
- Shirley Turner (1961–2003), perpetrator of the murder of Zachary Turner and his father
- Sonny Turner (1939–2022), American singer
- Sophie Turner (born 1996), English actress
- Stan Turner (footballer) (1926–1991), English soccer player
- Stan Turner (news anchor), Minneapolis area news anchor
- Stansfield Turner (1923–2018), director of the U.S. CIA
- Stuart Turner, British pump designer
- Sukhi Turner (born 1952), New Zealand politician, born in India
- Sylvester Turner (1954–2025), Mayor of Houston, Texas
- T. J. Turner (end) (1963–2009), American football player
- T. J. Turner (linebacker), American football player
- Ted Turner (1938–2026), American media mogul
- Tina Turner (1939–2023), American singer
- Titus Turner (1933–1984), American R&B and East Coast blues singer and songwriter
- Trea Turner (born 1993), American professional baseball player
- Victor Turner (1920–1983), Scottish anthropologist
- Walter J. Turner (1884–1947), Australian poet
- Yaakov Turner (1935–2024), mayor of Beersheba and a brigadier general in the Israeli Air Force
- Zachary Turner (2002–2003), baby drowned by his mother in Canadian murder/suicide
- Zeke Turner (born 1996), American football player

== Fictional characters ==
- Alan Turner (Emmerdale), played by Richard Thorp on Emmerdale
- Chris Turner, a character in the 1993 TV series Journey to the Center of the Earth
- Cole Turner, character in Charmed played by Julian McMahon
- Darnell Turner, character played by Eddie Steeples in My Name Is Earl
- Dave Turner, character in Degrassi: The Next Generation
- Griffin Turner, a character in Ninjago
- Gus Turner, in the TV series Robotboy
- Heidi Turner, minor character in South Park animated TV series
- Naomi Turner from Elena of Avalor
- Owen Turner, character in EastEnders
- Scott Turner, a character from the 1989 film Turner and Hooch
- Terence Turner, son of Alan Turner in Emmerdale, played by Stephen Marchant and then Nick Brimble
- Timmy Turner, main character on the Nickelodeon animated TV series The Fairly OddParents
  - Mr. and Mrs. Turner, Timmy's parents
  - Vivian "Viv" Turner, Timmy's 13-year-old cousin and main character from The Fairly OddParents: Fairly Odder
  - Ty Turner, Viv's father as well as Timmy's Uncle also from Fairly Odder
- Vernon Turner, character in the Fox television series Empire, played by Malik Yoba
- Violet Turner, a character in Private Practice
- Will Turner, fictional character, and one of the protagonists, in the Pirates of the Caribbean franchise
  - Bootstrap Bill Turner, Will's twice cursed pirate father
  - Henry Turner, Will Turner's and Elizabeth Swann's son
- Sean and Dorothy Turner, main characters on Apple's 2019 show Servant
- Jeanette Turner, main character on Freeform's recent miniseries Cruel Summer. Her parents are Gregory and Cindy, her elder brother is Derek.
- Martin Turner from Benjamin Zephaniah's novel Face.

== See also ==
- Justice Turner (disambiguation)
- Turner (potters), John, and his sons John and William, a family active in that trade in England 1756–1829
- C. Turner Joy (1895–1956), U.S. Navy Admiral in World War II and the Korean War
