= Fred Turner =

Fred or Frederick Turner is the name of:

== Sportsmen ==
- Fred Turner (footballer) (1930–1955), English footballer
- Freddy Turner (1914–2003), South African rugby player
- Frederick Harding Turner (1888–1915), Scottish rugby player

== Writers and academics ==
- Frederick Jackson Turner (1861–1932), American historian
- Frederick Turner (Jesuit) (1910–2001), British priest, archivist and librarian
- Frederick Turner (poet) (born 1943), American poet
- Frederick W. Turner (born 1937), American author, editor of Geronimo's autobiography, Redemption, The Go-Between
- Fred Turner (author) (born 1961), professor of communication at Stanford University and author
- Fred Turner (botanist) (1852–1939), Australian botanist

== Others ==
- Fred L. Turner (1933–2013), American restaurant executive, CEO and chairman of McDonald's until 2004
- Fred Turner (musician) (born 1943), Canadian founding member of Bachman–Turner Overdrive
- W. Fred Turner (1922–2003), American attorney
- F. A. Turner (1858–1923), American actor, sometimes credited as Fred Turner
- Frederick C. Turner Jr., American soldier and educator, first Black student and faculty member at Arkansas State University
- Frederick C. Turner (1923–2014), vice admiral in the United States Navy
- Frederick Turner (unionist) (1846–?), English-born American labor union leader
- Fred Turner (entrepreneur), British business executive in the United States, founder of Curative, Inc.
- Frederick Storrs Turner (1834–1916), British clergyman and campaigner against the opium trade

== See also ==
- Turner (surname)
