= Charles Howe =

Charles Howe may refer to:

- Charles Howe (boxer) (born 1974), American boxer
- Charles Howe (writer) (1661–1742), English devotional writer and courtier
- Charles Moffat Howe (1851–1920), mayor of Passaic, New Jersey
- Charles E. Howe (1846–1911), mayor of Lowell, Massachusetts
- Charles S. Howe (1858-1939), American educator
