= Francis Turner =

Francis Turner may refer to:

== Military ==
- Francis Turner (RAF officer) (1897–1982), British World War I flying ace
- Sir Francis Turner (Royal Navy officer) (1912–1921), British admiral

== Sports ==
- Francis Turner (cricketer, born 1890) (1890–1979), English cricketer
- Francis Turner (cricketer, born 1894) (1894–1954), English cricketer

== Others ==
- Francis Turner (bishop) (1637–1700), Bishop of Ely
- Francis A. Turner (1900–1962), American politician from Iowa
- Francis John Turner (1904–1985), New Zealand geologist
- Francis Turner (engineer) (1908–1999), U.S. government worker credited with creation of the Interstate Highway System

== See also ==
- Frank Turner (disambiguation)
