= Benjamin Turner =

Benjamin or Ben Turner may refer to:

== Artists ==
- Ben Turner (actor) (born 1980), British actor
- Ben Turner (producer), co-founder of Fulwell 73
- Benjamin Brecknell Turner (1815–1894), photographer

== Politicians ==
- Benjamin S. Turner (1825–1894), U.S. Representative from Alabama
- Sir Ben Turner (politician) (1863–1942), Member of Parliament for Batley and Morley
- Benjamin F. Turner Sr. (1873–1950), mayor of Passaic, New Jersey

== Sportspeople ==
- Ben Turner (weightlifter) (born 1984), Australian weightlifter
- Ben Turner (footballer) (born 1988), English footballer
- Ben Turner (cyclist) (born 1999), British cyclist

== Characters ==
- Benjamin Turner, character in Cake
- Bronze Tiger or Ben Turner, a fictional DC Comics character
