= Stephen Turner =

Stephen Turner may refer to:

- Stephen Park Turner (born 1951), educationist
- Stephen Barker Turner (born 1968), actor
- Stephen Turner (rower) (born 1964), British Olympic rower

== See also ==
- Stephen Turner House, historic house in Norfolk, Massachusetts
- Steve Turner (disambiguation)
