= Ken Turner =

Ken Turner may refer to:

- Ken Turner (Australian footballer) (born 1935), former Australian rules footballer
- Ken Turner (Australian politician) (born 1944), former Australian politician
- Ken Turner (baseball) (born 1943), former Major League Baseball pitcher
- Ken Turner (director), British television and film director and screenwriter
- Ken Turner (English footballer) (born 1941), English former footballer
- Kenneth Turner (1928–2018), Australian academic
