= Chris Turner =

Chris Turner may refer to:

== Sports ==
- Chris Turner (American football) (born 1987), American football quarterback
- Chris Turner (baseball) (born 1969), American baseball player
- Chris Turner (footballer, born 1951) (1951–2015), English football player and manager Cambridge United of Peterborough United
- Chris Turner (footballer, born 1958), English football player and manager of Sheffield Wednesday
- Chris Turner (footballer, born 1959), New Zealand international football player
- Chris Turner (footballer, born 1987), Northern Irish football player
- Chris Turner (footballer, born 1990), English football player
- Chris Turner (soccer) (born 1960), retired Canadian soccer goalkeeper
- Chris Turner (speedway rider) (born 1958), English speedway rider

== Other ==
- Chris Turner (comedian), British comedian and freestyle rap artist.
- Chris Turner (author) (born 1973), Canadian writer
- Chris Turner (Louisiana politician), Louisiana politician
- Chris Turner (Texas politician) (born 1972), Texas politician

== See also ==
- Christopher Turner (disambiguation)
- Christopher Turnor (disambiguation)
- Kriss Turner, American screenwriter and producer
- Christian Turner (born 1972), British diplomat
