= Hugh Turner =

Hugh Turner may refer to:

- Hugh Turner (footballer, born 1904) (1904–?), English Huddersfield Town goalkeeper football player
- Hugh Turner (footballer, born 1917) (1917–1992), English Darlington full back football player
- Hugh Turner (theologian) (1907–1995), academic and priest
- Hugh Thackeray Turner (1853–1937), English architect

== See also ==
- Turner (surname)
