= Curative =

Curative may refer to:

- Curative care, also called curative medicine, health care traditionally oriented towards seeking a cure for an existent disease or medical condition
- Curative (company), a healthcare startup company that scaled SARS-CoV-2 testing, COVID-19 vaccine distribution, and vaccination clinic management in the United States during the COVID-19 pandemic
- Curative petition, a legal petition specific to the India justice system that is a final remedy after the dismissal of a review petition by the Supreme Court of India
- Corrective rape, also called curative rape, a criminal practice, whereby homosexual women and men are raped by persons of the opposite sex to turn them heterosexual
