= Edward Turner =

Edward Turner may refer to:

- Sir Edward Turner, 1st Baronet (1691–1735), first of the Turner baronets
- Sir Edward Turner, 2nd Baronet (1719–1766), British politician
- Edward Turner (judge) (1778–1860), Justice of the Supreme Court of Mississippi
- Edward Turner (chemist) (1798–1837), British chemist
- Edward Beadon Turner (1854–1931), English medical administrator and rugby union international
- Edward Turner (cricketer) (1858–1893), Australian cricketer
- Edward C. Turner (1872–1950), American lawyer and judge in Ohio
- Edward George Turner (1872–1962), British film entrepreneur
- Edward Raymond Turner (1873–1903), British inventor and cinematographer
- Edward Turner (footballer) (1877–?), Northern Ireland international footballer
- Edward Turner (motorcycle designer) (1901–1973), British motorcycle designer
- Edward Clark Turner (1915–1997), American bishop of the Episcopal Diocese of Kansas
- Edward M. Turner (1918–1996), American Episcopal prelate
- Ed Turner (television executive) (1935–2002), CNN executive vice president
- Eddie Turner (fl. 1970s–2010s), guitarist
- Ed Turner (basketball) (born 1957), American basketball player
- Ed Turner (sprinter) (born 1975), American sprinter, 1997 All-American for the Washington Huskies track and field team

== See also ==
- Ted Turner (disambiguation)
