= Daniel Turner =

Daniel Turner may refer to:

- Daniel Turner (physician) (1667–1741), English physician who first noted the Auspitz's sign
- Daniel Turner (naval officer) (1794–1850), United States Navy officer
- Daniel Turner (North Carolina politician) (1796–1860), United States representative for North Carolina
- Daniel Webster Turner (1877–1969), American soldier and governor of Iowa
- Daniel Turner (hymn writer) (1710–1798), English teacher, Baptist minister and hymn-writer
- Daniel Turner (artist) (born 1983), American visual artist
- Daniel Turner (footballer) (born 2002), Australian rules footballer

== See also ==
- Dan Turner (disambiguation)
