= Ron Turner =

Ron or Ronald Turner may refer to:

- Ron Turner (American football) (born 1953), Florida International University's head coach
- Ron Turner (illustrator) (1922–1998), British illustrator and comics artist
- Ron Turner (publisher), American comics publisher
- Ron Turner (water polo) (1929–2007), British water polo player
- Ron Turner (coach), USA Swimming
- Ronald Renelle Turner (1960–2022), American actor, singer, and youngest son of Tina Turner
- Ronald Turner (politician) (1915–1965), Canadian politician
- Ronald William Turner (1896–?), English World War I flying ace
- Ronald Turner (cricketer) (1885–1915), English cricketer
- Ron Turner (rugby league) (1945–2026), Australian rugby league footballer
- Ronnie Turner (1911–?), Rhodesian international bowler

== See also ==
- Turner (surname)
