= Pat Turner =

Pat Turner may refer to:

== Women (Patricia) ==
- Pat Turner (Aboriginal activist) (born 1952), Aboriginal Australian civil administrator and activist
- Pat Turner (rower) (born 1961), a Canadian rower and Olympic gold medalist
- Pat Turner (trade unionist) (1927–2000), British trade unionist
- Patricia Turner, (born 1955) American folklorist, author, and academic
- Patricia L. Turner, surgeon and executive director of the American College of Surgeons

== Men (Patrick) ==
- Patrick Alasdair Fionn Turner (1969 – 2011), British-born scientist
- Patrick Turner (born 1987), American football wide receiver
- Pat Turner (long jumper) (born 1918), American long and triple jumper, 1939 and 1940 All-American for the UCLA Bruins track and field team
- Patrick Turner, fictional character on BBC television drama series Call the Midwife

== See also ==
- Paddy Turner, Irish football player
- Turner (surname)
