= Tokarev =

Tokarev (or Tokaryev) (Russian: Токарев), or Tokareva (Токарева), is a Russian patronymic surname, derived from the word "токарь" (turner). Notable people with the surname include:

- Anton Tokarev (born 1984), Russian skater
- Boris Tokarev (athlete) (1927–2002), Russian athlete
- Boris Tokarev (actor) (born 1947), Russian actor
- Fedor Tokarev (1871–1968), Russian arms designer and later Deputy of the Supreme Soviet of the USSR
- Nadezda Tokareva, Russian-Slovenian classical violinist
- Nikolay Tokarev (born 1950), Russian businessman
- Nikolai Tokarev (pianist) (born 1983), Russian pianist
- Viktoriya Tokareva (born 1937), Russian writer
- Willi Tokarev (1934–2019), Russian and former expatriate Russian-American singer-songwriter

== Other uses ==
- Tokarev (film), a 2014 American thriller film
- Tokarev, Astrakhan Oblast, a rural locality in Russia
- TT pistol, a Russian semi-automatic pistol
- 7.62×25mm Tokarev, the cartridge used in most TT pistols
