= Ian Turner =

Ian Turner may refer to:

- Ian Turner (Australian political activist) (1922–1978), Australian political activist and historian
- Ian Turner (footballer, born 1953), English footballer for Grimsby Town, Southampton and Walsall
- Ian Turner (Irish footballer) (born 1989), Irish footballer
- Ian Turner (rower) (1925–2010), American rower
- Ian Turner (cricketer) (born 1968), English cricketer
- Ian Turner (rugby league) (born 1970), Australian businessman and rugby league footballer
- Ian Turner (speedway rider) (born 1949), English speedway rider
- Ian Mark Turner (born 1963), British botanist

== See also ==
- Iain Turner (born 1984), Scottish football goalkeeper for Everton
