= Jane Turner (disambiguation) =

Jane Turner can refer to:

- Jane Turner (born 1960), Australian actress and comedian
- Jane Turner (Baptist writer), author of Choice Experiences (1653)
- Jane Turner (FBI whistleblower), American FBI agent and whistleblower
