= Cyril Turner =

English cricketer

Cyril Turner (11 January 1902 – 19 November 1968) was an English first-class cricketer, who played 200 first-class matches for Yorkshire County Cricket Club from 1925 to 1946, and one match for the Minor Counties in 1935.

Born in Wombwell, Yorkshire, England, Turner worked in the South Yorkshire coal fields before joining Yorkshire, whom he served as player, coach and scorer for thirty one years. He scored 6,132 runs at 26.20, with two centuries, against Somerset (130) and Hampshire (115). He took 181 catches, and 173 wickets at 30.75 with his right arm medium pace, with a best of 7 for 54 against Gloucestershire. He took five wickets in an innings on four occasions. He won his Yorkshire cap in 1935. He was part of the team which dominated the County Championship in the 1930s.

Turner died in November 1968, in Wath-on-Dearne, Yorkshire. His brother, Francis Turner, played five matches for Yorkshire and his son, Brian Turner, also played twice for them.
