= Frank Turner (disambiguation) =

Frank Turner (born 1981) is an English folk/punk singer-songwriter.

Frank Turner may also refer to:

- Frank Turner (gymnast) (1922–2010), British Olympic gymnast
- Frank C. Turner, Francis Turner (engineer) (1908–1999), American civil engineer, Federal Highway Administration head
- Frank S. Turner (1947–2025), American politician in the Maryland House of Delegates
- Frank Turner (basketball) (born 1988), American basketball player
- F. A. Turner (1858–1923), American actor sometimes credited as Frank Turner
- Frank Turner (footballer) (1886–1963), Australian rules footballer
- Frank Newman Turner (1913–1964), British organic farmer, writer and broadcaster
- Frank C. Turner (born 1951), Canadian actor and iconographer

== See also ==
- Francis Turner (disambiguation)
