= Janet Turner =

Janet Turner may refer to:

- Janet Turner (footballer), English footballer
- Janet Turner (designer) (1936–2015), British designer
- Janet E. Turner (1914–1988), American artist and printmaker

== See also ==
- Jane Turner (disambiguation)
