= Robert Turner =

Robert, Rob, Bob, Bobby or Robbie Turner may refer to:

== Arts ==
- Robert Chapman Turner (1913–2005), American potter
- Robert Turner (composer) (1920–2012), Canadian composer
- Robert Levon Been (born 1978), a.k.a. Robert Turner, American musician
- Robby Turner (1962/1963–2025), American steel guitar player

== Politics ==
=== U.S. politics ===
- Bob Turner (Texas politician) (1934–2022), American politician from Texas
- Bob Turner (New York politician) (born 1941), congressman from New York
- Robert L. Turner (born 1947), Democratic member of the Wisconsin State Assembly

=== Other politics ===
- Robert Turner (MP) (fl. 1597–1601), English Member of Parliament for Downton and Old Sarum
- Bob Turner, Canadian politician, unsuccessful candidate in Manitoba Liberal Party candidates, 1995 Manitoba provincial election
- Bob Turner (Canadian politician) (born 1948), Canadian politician from Alberta

== Science and technology ==
- Robert Lowry Turner (1923–1990), cancer research pioneer
- Robert Turner (endocrinologist) (1938–1999), professor in diabetes and endocrinology
- Robert Turner (neuroscientist) (born 1946), MRI physicist

== Sports ==
=== American football ===
- Bobby Turner (born 1949), American football coach
- Robert Turner (defensive back) (1971–1991), American college football player
- Rob Turner (born 1984), American football offensive lineman

=== Cricket ===
- Robert Turner (Middlesex cricketer), 18th-century English cricketer
- Bob Turner (cricketer, born 1885) (1885–1959), English cricketer
- Robert Turner (Nottinghamshire cricketer) (1888–1947), English cricketer
- Robert Turner (cricketer, born 1967), English cricketer

=== Other sports ===
- Robert Turner (footballer) (1877–?), English footballer
- Bob Turner (baseball) (1926–1962), American baseball player
- Bob Turner (ice hockey) (1934–2005), Canadian ice hockey player
- Bob Turner (footballer, born 1936) (1936–2025), Australian footballer for Melbourne
- Bob Turner (footballer, born 1942), Australian footballer for Footscray
- Robbie Turner (born 1966), English footballer
- Robert Turner (canoeist), British slalom canoer in 1998 European Canoe Slalom Championships
- Robert Turner (basketball) (born 1993), American basketball player
- Eric Turner (athlete) (1909–?), British javelin thrower who competed under the name Robert Turner

== Other ==
- Robert Turner (divine) (died 1599), Scottish Roman Catholic divine
- Robert Turner (soldier) (1820–1910), British gunner
- Robert Turner (Bahá'í) (1855/1856–1909), First African American Bahá’í
- Robert Edward Turner III (born 1938), American media mogul
- Robert F. Turner (born 1944), professor of international law and national security law
- Leigh Turner (Robert Leigh Turner, born 1958), British diplomat
- Robert Turner (poker player), American professional poker player
- Robbie Turner (drag queen)

== See also ==
- Bert Turner (disambiguation)
