= Neil Turner =

Neil Turner may refer to:

- Neil Turner (British politician) (born 1945), British Labour politician
- Neil Turner (Australian politician) (1934–2011), former speaker of the Queensland Legislative Assembly
- Neil Turner (footballer) (1891–1971), Scottish forward
- Neil Turner (rugby league) (born 1963), British winger
- Neil Clifford Turner (born 1940), Australian agricultural scientist
