= Curative (company) =

American health care startup company

Curative Inc.
- Type: Private
- Industry: Life sciences, biotechnology, medical diagnostics, healthcare industry
- Founded: 2020
- Founders: Fred Turner; Isaac Turner; Vlad Slepnev
- Headquarters: Austin, Texas
- Key people: Fred Turner (CEO); Isaac Turner (CTO); Tami Wilson-Ciranna (President, CFO)
- Number of employees: >3000 (2021)
- Website: curative.com

Curative Inc. is a United States-based health insurance company headquartered in Austin, Texas. In September 2022, it launched Curative Insurance Company, an employer-based health plan that is structured with a single monthly premium and is marketed as having no copayments and no deductibles for covered services within its network.

Curative was founded in January 2020 and initially developed diagnostic tools before pivoting to COVID-19 testing and vaccination operations during the COVID-19 pandemic. The company began winding down its COVID-19 testing business in 2022 and transitioned its operations to focus on health insurance in 2023.

== History ==
=== Founding (2020) ===
In January 2020, Fred Turner, Isaac Turner (no relation), and Vlad Slepnev co-founded Curative, Inc. to create new diagnostic tools for the detection and management of sepsis.

=== COVID-19 Operations (2020-2022) ===
In response to nationwide (US) shortages of diagnostic test kits, laboratory testing capacity, and personal protective equipment (PPE) available to healthcare workers, the company abruptly pivoted to focus on COVID-19 in March 2020. Curative developed a self-collected oral fluid swab as an alternative sample collection method, an orthogonal supply chain approach to avoid competing with other SARS-CoV-2/COVID-19 test kit and laboratory analysis providers, created the Curative SARS-CoV-2 Assay, and began field tests using supervised self-collection in Los Angeles and Long Beach (California) in March. In early April, Curative contacted UK government officials, offering to supply 50,000 test kits per week.

The company's novel RT-PCR-based Curative SARS-CoV-2 Assay received FDA Emergency Use Authorization (EUA) in April 2020. Later in April 2020, the United States Department of Defense signed a US$13M agreement with Curative to source Curative SARS-CoV-2 Assay kits for Air Force use, to establish a new laboratory facility with testing capacity of 50,000 tests per day within one week of signing, and to establish additional test locations across the US at a later date. By October 2020, the company had expanded operations, processing nearly 10% of the COVID-19 tests performed in the United States. As of March 2021, Curative operated COVID-19 testing laboratories in San Dimas (California), Austin (Texas), and Washington, D.C.

After the Emergency Use Authorization had been issued, health care workers used Curative SARS-CoV-2 Assay to observe, direct, self-collect oral and nasal swabs, and subsequent laboratory analysis. The Curative SARS-CoV-2 Assay were implemented for medical diagnostic programs in the United States, including United States Armed Forces operations, prisons, state-wide nursing home, long-term care facilities, city-wide centers, regional testing centers, state-wide testing programs, and airports. The company partnered with universities to provide on-campus testing to students and/or student athletes (Texas A&M, Florida A&M (Bragg Stadium), Western New Mexico University, Our Lady of the Lake).

In July 2020, the United States Department of Defense awarded a CARES Act-funded contract (US$42M) to Curative to provide 250,000 test kits for use at more than 100 military treatment facilities, and analysis and reporting services at Curative's high throughput laboratory.

In August 2020, Florida officials signed a contract with Curative to provide COVID-19 testing services for staff at nursing home and long-term care facilities located throughout the state. Using a biweekly testing schedule, the test positivity rate for staff members decreased from 3% to 1%. Subsequently, "a majority of the state's 694 nursing homes" entered into agreements with Curative to resume testing of staff and expand testing to include residents.

In January 2021, the FDA released a Safety Communication warning the public of the risk of false negative results with the Curative test. The communication restated the patient populations, test uses, and other conditions that were previously validated and allowed under the original Emergency Use Authorization (EUA).

In December 2020, Curative began COVID-19 vaccine distribution in Los Angeles. By February 2021, the company's vaccine distribution and vaccine clinic management service had expanded to sites in California, Delaware, Florida, Massachusetts, Michigan, Pennsylvania, and Texas.

=== Transition to Health Insurance (2022-2023) ===
Beginning in 2022, Curative pivoted their business to health insurance, offering health plans with $0 copays and $0 deductibles for in-network care. Initially launched in the Austin, Texas area, the company eventually expanded to include plans in over 20 states, including Georgia and Florida. The plans are available to employers with 51 or more employees.

As of 2026, Curative's valuation is over $1.3 billion.

== Products ==
=== Health Insurance (2023-Present) ===
Curative health plans offer a single premium with $0 copays and $0 deductibles for in-network care when a "Baseline Visit" is completed within 120 days of enrollment. Consisting of a preventative health screening and onboarding, it helps patients learn more about diseases and how to prevent sicknesses before they occur.

Curative offers both fully-insured and self-funded options for employers with 51 or more employees.

Curative also offers what they call a "Curative Cash Card", which can be used for both in-patient and outpatient hospital services regardless of their benefit plan. No prior authorization is required when using the Cash Card.

The company has earned an HITRUST r2 certification for information security.

In 2025, Curative launched Curative Telehealth, which connects members with licensed providers across all 50 states.

In 2024, 2025, and 2026, Curative obtained a Network adequacy waiver in place of meeting health plan requirements. In 2023, Curative was identified as having deficiency’s in one or more specialties in Atascosa, Bandera, Bastrop, Bell, Bexar, Brazoria, Brazos, Burnet, Collin, Comal, Dallas, Denton, El Paso, Fort Bend, Frio, Galveston, Harris, Kendall, Lee, Llano, Lubbock, McLennan, Medina, Milam, Montgomery, Nueces, Tarrant, Travis, Williamson, Wilson counties.

=== Curative SARS-CoV-2 Assay (2020-2022) ===
The Curative SARS-CoV-2 Assay is a nucleic acid amplification test (NAAT), reverse transcription polymerase chain reaction test (RT-PCR) for COVID-19. The test was designed to be scalable in response to changes in demand, and uses a healthcare worker observed, self-collected oral fluid swab to obtain specimens for testing. During the self-collection procedure, a person coughs before swabbing the inside of their mouth to collect oral fluid for testing; the cough serves to release virus (if present) from the respiratory tract. The self-collected oral fluid swab method is less invasive than the nasopharyngeal swab method, reduces the risk to healthcare workers by eliminating close contact, and reduces the need to change PPE frequently. The reduction in PPE usage was an advantage during the global shortage of medical materials related to the COVID-19 pandemic.

In January 2021, the FDA released a safety communication warning of false negative test results. Consequently LA County and the United States Congress suspended use of the tests.

In July 2021, Curative switched over to using Abbott's Alinity m SARS-CoV-2 Assay and requested the FDA revoke EUA clearance for its original test.

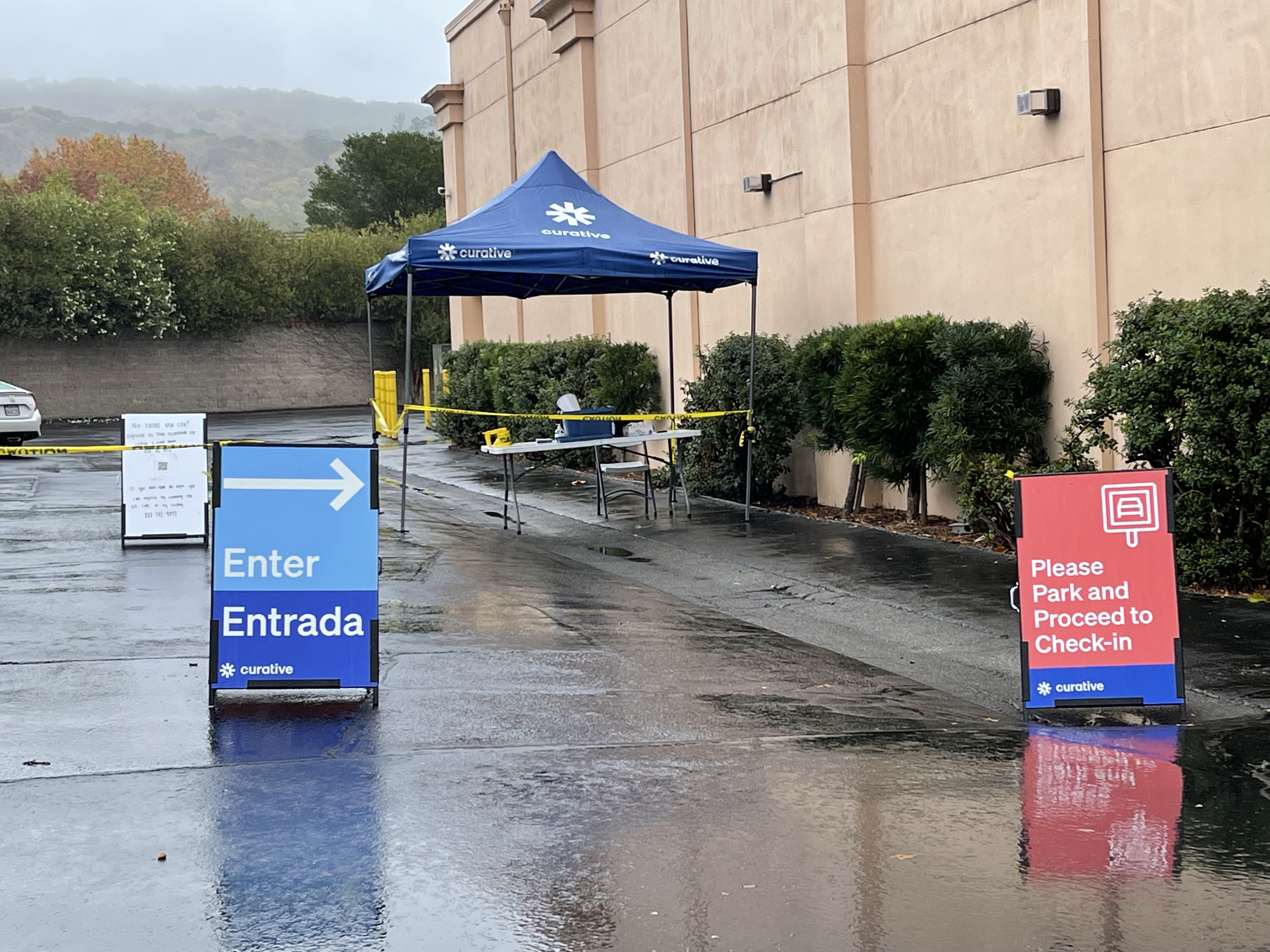
Curative testing site in Boyes Hot Springs, California in 2021.

=== Accessible testing (2020-2022) ===
After developing a scalable SARS-CoV-2 diagnostic test and laboratory facilities, Curative worked to make COVID-19 testing as accessible as possible. The company partnered with cities, regions, and states across the United States, setting up and managing different types of testing sites (including drive-through, mobile vans, kiosks, and walkup locations) in an effort to reach general and at-risk populations. As of October 2021, Curative managed 16,557 testing sites nationwide, including mobile van, kiosk, walk-up, and drive-through sites.

=== Vaccinations ===
In late 2020, Curative became one of the first companies to administer COVID-19 vaccines in Los Angeles, after vaccines from Pfizer and Moderna became publicly available in the United States. Curative used the scaling principles that enabled it to quickly create mass and mobile COVID-19 testing capabilities to create a vaccine distribution and vaccination management strategy. As of February 2021, the company had partnered with communities in California, Delaware, Florida, Massachusetts, Michigan, Pennsylvania, and Texas, administering vaccinations across 170 sites. Vaccination sites operated by the company include traditional, large scale (also known as mass vaccination), drive-through, and mobile vans.

=== Mayo Clinic Lawsuit ===
In September 2026, Curative was sued by the Mayo Clinic for breach of contract.

== Awards ==
In 2020, Curative, Inc. was named a LinkedIn Top Startup, and was the recipient of the 2020 dot.LA Summit Award "Pivot of the Year".

In 2021, Curative was named Best Medtech Startup in the Medtech Breakthrough Awards, was a finalist in the Pandemic Response category, and received an honorable mention in the Health category as part of our 2021 World Changing Ideas Awards by Fast Company. The company also received an honorable mention for Fast Company's Best Place to Work for Innovators Award.

In 2025, Curative was named one of Fast Company's 15 Most Innovative Companies in Healthcare for, "bringing copay- and deductible-free health insurance to employers across the south"

Curative has won various awards from Top Work Places since 2024, including Culture Excellence Awards in Employee Well-Being and Innovation and Industry Awards for the Nonprofit Industry. USA Today also named it a Top Workplace in 2025.
