= Brian Turner (cricketer) =

English cricketer

Brian Turner (25 July 1938, Sheffield, Yorkshire, England – 27 December 2015) was an English first-class cricketer, who played in two matches for Yorkshire County Cricket Club in 1960 and 1961.

Turner was a right arm medium pace swing bowler and right-handed batsman, who has lived for the bulk of his life Wath-upon-Dearne, near Rotherham, Yorkshire. He made his first-class debut against the South Africans in 1960, and the second in 1961 against Gloucestershire. In those two games, Turner took four wickets at 11.75, with a best return of 2 for 9 against the South Africans, when he took 3 for 17 in the match. He scored seven runs in two completed innings, and took two catches.

He also played cricket for Sheffield United Cricket Club in the Yorkshire League, and was the professional at Golcar C.C. in the Huddersfield League for several years - winning the league bowling award on many occasions.

His father, Cyril Turner, and uncle, Francis Turner, were also professional cricketers, who both played in the first-class game for Yorkshire.
