= Alex Turner (disambiguation) =

Alex Turner (born 1986) is an English singer-songwriter and guitarist for Arctic Monkeys and The Last Shadow Puppets.

Alex or Alexander Turner may refer to:

- Alex Turner (director) (born 1971), American film director
- Alexander Turner (slave), Virginian slave who escaped at the beginning of the American Civil War and fought in the Union army, and father of Daisy Turner
- Alexander Buller Turner (1893–1915), British soldier in World War I
- Alexander Turner (jurist) (1901–1993), New Zealand lawyer and judge
- Alexander Turner (judoka) (born 1993), American judoka
