= Samuel Turner =

Samuel Turner may refer to:

- Samuel Turner (Royalist) (died c. 1647), physician and Royalist during the English Civil War
- Samuel Turner (diplomat) (1759-1802), British traveller
- Samuel Turner (informer) (1765–1807), Irish barrister, Protestant supporter of the United Irishmen who turned informer
- Samuel H. Turner (1790–1861), American Hebraist
- Samuel Turner (VC) (1826–1868), English soldier decorated for valour during the Indian Mutiny
- Sam Turner (footballer, born 1980), Welsh former footballer
- Sam Turner (footballer, born 1993), English footballer
- Sam Turner (athlete) (born 1957), American hurdler
- Chip Turner (Samuel Chipman Turner, 1893–1978), Australian rules footballer
