= Margery J. Turner =

American dancer, choreographer and author

Margery J. Turner (1921−2004) was an American dancer, choreographer and author. Turner earned a B.S. degree from Chicago Teachers College (now Chicago State University) in 1943, an M.S. degree from the University of Wisconsin-Madison in 1947, and a Doctoral degree from New York University in 1957.

Turner introduced modern dance into the curriculum at the University of Nevada, Reno, and at the University of Illinois at Urbana-Champaign from 1947 to 1951. She developed the B.A. and B.F.A. programs in Modern Dance and established the dance department at the Mason Gross School of the Arts at Rutgers University where she spent the last 27 years of her teaching career. The Margery J. Turner Choreographer Prize at the Mason Gross School of the Arts was established in her honor. Turner authored three books including New Dance: Approaches to Nonliteral Choreography (University of Pittsburgh Press, 1971). It was reviewed in the American Dance Guild's magazine Dance Scope in 1971.
