= Alfred Turner =

Alfred Turner may refer to:

- Alfred Jefferis Turner (1861–1947), British and Australian pediatrician and entomologist
- Alfred Dudley Turner (1854–1888), American composer
- Alfred Turner (sculptor) (1874–1940), British sculptor
- Sir Alfred Edward Turner (1842–1918), British army officer
