= Andrew Turner =

Andrew or Andy Turner may refer to:

- Andrew Jackson Turner (1832–1905), American politician, newspaper editor, and businessman
- Andrew Turner (politician) (born 1953), member of parliament for the Isle of Wight from 2001 to 2017
- Andrew Turner (RAF officer) (born 1967), senior officer and helicopter pilot
- Andy Turner (footballer) (born 1975), English footballer
- Andrew Turner (lacrosse) (born 1978), Canadian lacrosse player
- Andrew D. Turner (1920–1947), member of the Tuskegee Airmen
- Andy Turner (hurdler) (born 1980), British athlete
- Andrew Turner (rugby union, born 1993), American international rugby union player
- Andrew Turner (rugby union, born 2002), English rugby union player
- Aim (musician) (Andrew Turner, born 1970), British musician and DJ
