= Dan Turner =

Dan Turner may refer to:

== Politics ==
- Dan W. Turner (1877–1969), 25th Governor of Iowa, U.S.
- Dan Turner (Manitoba politician), Canadian politician

== Sport ==
- Dan Turner (footballer) (born 1998), English semi-professional footballer
- Dan Turner (rugby union) (born 1980), Scottish rugby union player
- Danielle Turner (born 1991), English professional footballer

== Others ==
- Dan Turner (AIDS activist), American AIDS activist in San Francisco in the 1980s
- Dan Turner (director) (born 1968), British film director
- Dan Turner, Hollywood Detective, pulp magazine fictional character

== See also ==
- Daniel Turner (disambiguation)
