= Edward Turner (cricketer) =

Australian cricketer

Personal information
- Born: 8 August 1858; Colony of Victoria
- Died: 26 January 1893 (aged 34); Melbourne, Australia

Domestic team information
- Years: Team
- 1881-1884: Victoria
- Source: Cricinfo, 22 July 2015

Edward Turner (8 August 1858 – 26 January 1893) was an Australian cricketer. He played nine first-class cricket matches for Victoria between 1881 and 1884.

== See also ==
- List of Victoria first-class cricketers
