= Daniel Turner (physician) =

English pioneering dermatologist

Daniel Turner (18 September 1667 – 13 March 1740/41) was a London physician who published the first textbook on dermatology in English. De Morbis Cutaneis was first published in 1714 and went through several English editions. It was also published in French and German.

Turner started his medical career as a barber surgeon. In 1723 he was awarded a Doctor of Medicine (abbreviated M.D.) by Yale College, the first ever D.M. awarded by the US college.
