= Bert Turner =

Bert Turner may refer to:

- Bert Turner (politician) (1888–1973), member of the Queensland Legislative Assembly
- Bert Turner (footballer, born 1899) (1899–1953), English footballer who played for Merthyr Town, Coventry City, Torquay United and Bristol Rovers
- Bert Turner (footballer, born 1907) (1907–1959), English footballer
- Bert Turner (footballer, born 1909) (1909–1981), Welsh international footballer who played for Charlton Athletic
- Hubert Turner, cricketer, see List of Leeward Islands first-class cricketers

== See also ==
- Albert Turner (disambiguation)
- Robert Turner (disambiguation)
- Herbert Turner (disambiguation)
