= Sarah Turner =

Sarah Turner may refer to:

- Sarah Turner (filmmaker), British filmmaker and academic
- Sarah Lucille Turner (1898–1972), Missouri lawyer and politician
- Sarah E. Turner, American professor of economics and education
