= Ian Turner (cricketer) =

English cricketer

Personal information
- Full name: Ian John Turner
- Born: 18 July 1968 (age 58); Denmead, Hampshire, England
- Height: 6 ft 1 in (1.85 m)
- Batting: Right-handed
- Bowling: Slow left-arm orthodox

Domestic team information
- Years: Team
- 1989–1993: Hampshire

Career statistics
Competition	First-class	List A
Matches	24	17
Runs scored	159	3
Batting average	8.36	1.50
100s/50s	–/–	–/–
Top score	38*	2
Balls bowled	4,299	754
Wickets	54	16
Bowling average	36.38	34.25
5 wickets in innings	1	–
10 wickets in match	–	–
Best bowling	5/81	3/58
Catches/stumpings	12/–	3/–
- Source: Cricinfo, 12 December 2009

Ian John Turner (born 18 July 1968) is an English former cricketer who played for county cricket for Hampshire between 1989 and 1993.

== Cricket career ==
Turner was born in Denmead in July 1968. A slow left-arm orthodox bowler, he played his early cricket at club level for Hambledon, before making his debut for Hampshire in a first-class match against Glamorgan in the 1989 County Championship. He began the 1990 season by playing against Oxford University, before being called-up to Hampshire's squad in May alongside fellow spinner Shaun Udal for their County Championship match against Sussex. Turner featured in four first-class matches during the 1990 season, taking 9 wickets at an average of 47.11. The following season, he featured in eight matches in the 1991 County Championship, taking 14 wickets at an average of 45.50. In the 1992 season, he would not feature in the County Championship until August, but would make seven appearances. In these, he took 19 wickets at an average of 27.31; against Essex, he took the only five wicket haul of his career with figures of 5 for 81. Turner made his debut in List A one-day cricket against Gloucestershire in the 1992 Sunday League; he featured in seven matches during the competition, taking 4 wickets. The following season, he featured in four first-class matches in May and June, taking 8 wickets at an average of 42.12. In one-day cricket, he made ten appearances during the 1993 season, taking 12 wickets at an average of exactly 35. He was released by Hampshire following the 1993 season. In 24 first-class appearances for Hampshire, he took 54 wickets at an average of 36.38. In one-day cricket, he made seventeen appearances, taking 16 wickets at an average of 34.25, with best figures of 3 for 58.

After the end of his professional career, Turner returned to playing club cricket for Hambeldon, with him still making appearances for the club up until 2022.
