= Francis Turner (cricketer, born 1890) =

English cricketer

Personal information
- Full name: Francis Gordon Turner
- Born: 1 March 1890; Kensington, London, England
- Died: 21 November 1979 (aged 89); Deal, Kent, England
- Batting: Right-handed
- Bowling: Leg break

Domestic team information
- Years: Team
- 1912: Hampshire

Career statistics
Competition	First-class
Matches	1
Runs scored	14
Batting average	14.00
100s/50s	–/–
Top score	14
Catches/stumpings	1/–
- Source: Cricinfo, 1 January 2010

Francis Gordon Turner OBE MC (1 March 1890 — 21 November 1979) was an English first-class cricketer, British Army officer, and educator.

The son of John Turner and his wife, Esther, he was born at Kensington in March 1890. He was educated at Westminster School, before matriculating to Trinity College, Cambridge. After graduating from Cambridge, he became an assistant master at Twyford School in Hampshire between 1911 and 1913, which at the time was under the headmastership of the cricketer Harold McDonell. Turner played first-class cricket for Hampshire in 1912, making a single appearance against Cambridge University at Southampton. Batting once in the match, he was dismissed in Hampshire's first innings for 14 runs by Eric Kidd. He left Twyford in 1913 to become an assistant master at Felsted School.

With the outbreak of the First World War in July 1914, Turner's teaching career was interrupted. He would serve in the war, being commissioned as a temporary second lieutenant into the Hampshire Regiment in January 1915. Serving the entirety of the war on the Western Front, he was transferred to the Dorset Regiment in September 1915. In the same month, he was made a temporary captain, prior to gaining the full rank of lieutenant two months later. Turner was awarded the Military Cross in the 1917 Birthday Honours. In August of the same year, he was serving at headquarters as a brigade major. He remained in France until the end of the war, being demobilised in February 1919. He was made an OBE in the 1919 Birthday Honours, for valuable service rendered in connection with military operations in France.

Following the end of the war, Turner returned to teaching. He was appointed headmaster of Tormore School in Kent in 1919, an appointment he held until his retirement in 1955. Turner died in November 1979 at Deal, Kent.
