= Elizabeth Turner (disambiguation) =

Elizabeth Turner is an American canoeist.

Elizabeth Turner may also refer to:

== People ==
- Elizabeth Kathleen Turner (1914-1999), Australian physician and paediatrician
- Mary Elizabeth Turner (1854–1907), English embroiderer

== Fictional characters ==
- Elizabeth Swann, married name Turner, Pirates of the Caribbean character
- Liz Turner, EastEnders character
