= Ted Turner (disambiguation) =

Ted Turner (1938–2026) was an American media mogul and philanthropist.

Ted Turner may also refer to:

- Ted Turner (guitarist) (born 1950), guitarist and vocalist
- Ted Turner (baseball) (1892–1958), Major League Baseball pitcher
- Ted Turner (footballer) (1921–1981), Australian rules footballer
- Teddy Turner (1917–1992), English actor

== See also ==
- Edward Turner
