= Jane Turner (Baptist writer) =

English Baptist and devotional writer

Jane Turner (before 1640 – after 1660) was an English Baptist and devotional writer. Her Choice Experiences (1653) was "the first singly published, Baptist conversion narrative".

== Life ==
Jane Turner married Captain John Turner, a soldier stationed in the Scottish garrison commanded by Robert Lilburne at Dalkeith. It seems likely that Jane Turner was living in Dalkeith when her memoir was published in 1653. John Gardiner, with John Turner one of three men who added a preface to Choice Experiences, was also stationed there.

Choice Experiences was originally composed as a personal journal, and published with the encouragement of her husband.

== Works ==
- Choice Experiences of the Kind Dealings of God before, in and after Conversion; laid down in six general heads. Together with some brief observations upon the same. Whereunto is added a description of the experience. London: Printed by H. Hils,1653.
