= Jason Turner =

Jason Turner may refer to:

- Jason Turner (figure skater) (born 1971), Olympic figure skater
- Jason Turner (sport shooter) (born 1975), Olympic sport shooter
- Jason Turner (cartoonist) (born 1970), Canadian cartoonist
- Jason Turner (drummer), American drummer of the band Pavement
