= Robert Turner (footballer) =

English footballer

Robert Turner (1877 – unknown) was an English footballer. His regular position was at full-back. He was born in Manchester.

He played for Manchester United, making two Football League appearances in the 1898-1899 season, when the club was known as Newton Heath F.C.

He also played for Red Rock, Gravesend United, Brighton United and Cray Wanderers.

Whilst at Cray, he was part of the side that won the 1901-1902 Kent League Championship, scoring four goals during the season.
