= Carl Turner =

Carl or Karl Turner may refer to:

== Politics ==
- Karl Turner (born 1971), British politician
- Karl Turner (American politician) (1942–2025), American politician and businessman from Maine
- Carl Turner (politician), member of the Kansas House of Representatives

== Other people ==
- Carl C. Turner (1913–1996), United States Army general
- Carl Turner, English DJ, member of Bizarre Inc
- Karl Turner (cricketer) (born 1987), English cricketer
