= Diane Turner =

American politician

Mayor of Murray, Utah
- In office August 29, 2017 – September 19, 2017
- Preceded by: Ted Eyre
- Succeeded by: Blair Camp

Personal details
- Born: 1953 (age 72–73)
- Party: Democratic
- Spouse: Charles Turner
- Children: 2
- Education: University of Utah

Diane Turner was mayor of Murray, Utah from August 25, 2017, to September 19, 2017, after the death of Mayor Ted Eyre. Turner's brief term of office was significant as it was the first time that an acting mayor was appointed to office in Murray. Due to her appointment, she also became the first female to ever serve as mayor of Murray.

== City Council ==
First elected to Murray Utah City Council in 2014 for council district five, Turner had previously campaigned for Salt Lake County Council but was defeated by David Wilde in 2006. In the 2017 election, Turner ran unopposed for re-election.

Under Utah law, when a vacancy occurs in the office of the mayor, the chair of the city council serves as acting mayor. Turner was chair of the city council. During Turner’s brief term, she retained her city council seat because her role as acting mayor was temporary. Following a process specified in state law, the city council shall, within 30 days from the date of the vacancy, appoint an interim mayor to serve until a new mayor is elected and sworn into office. Murray City Council accepted applications, however, Acting Mayor Turner did not apply to be interim mayor, and ran for re-election, unopposed, for her city council seat.

Fellow city councilman Blair Camp was appointed the interim mayor. Turner told the Murray Journal, “I originally made an application because I wanted to ensure that we have a smooth transition from acting mayor to interim mayor and finally to mayor-elect and that we had at least one applicant who would meet that standard. When we had three qualified applicants I was able to pull out. I have no interest in having a full-time job at this time in my life, and the mayor’s job is full-time plus.”

== Personal ==
Turner is a graduate of the University of Utah with a Master of Public Administration. Her employment has included working with troubled youth in the State of Utah Division of Juvenile Justice Services. She was also appointed as a board member of the Commission on Youth.
