= Tokarev, Astrakhan Oblast =

Tokarev Токарев
- Khutor
- Location within Astrakhan Oblast Location within Russia
- Coordinates: 48°35′08″N 45°40′00″E
- Country: Russia
- Region: Astrakhan Oblast
- District: Akhtubinsky District
- Time zone: UTC+4:00

Tokarev (Russian: Токарев) is a rural locality (a khutor) in Kapustinoyarsky Selsoviet of Akhtubinsky District, Astrakhan Oblast, Russia. The population was 45 as of 2010. There is 1 street.

== Geography ==
Tokarev is located 55 km (34 mi) northwest of Akhtubinsk (the district's administrative centre) by road. Stasov is the nearest rural locality.
