= Anna Turner =

Anna Turner may refer to:

- Anna Turner (producer) (1944–1996), U.S. partner of the Hearts of Space radio show and record label
- Anna Turner, High Sheriff of Shropshire, 2009–2010 and Lord Lieutenant of Shropshire since 2019
- Anna Turner, co-owner with Roy Turner of Australian private island resort Haggerston Island
- Sheriff Anna Turner, a character in the TV series The Dead Zone, played by Cara Buono

== See also ==
- Ann Turner (disambiguation)
- Anne Turner (disambiguation)
