= Paul Turner =

Paul Turner may refer to:

- Paul Turner (American football coach), American football coach
- Paul Turner (rugby league) (born 2000), New Zealand rugby league footballer
- Paul Turner (rugby union) (born 1960), Welsh rugby union footballer and coach
- Paul Turner (tackle), American college football player
- Paul Turner (wide receiver) (born 1993), American football wide receiver
- Paul Turner (director) (1945-2019), Welsh film director
- Paul Turner (bassist) (born 1968), English bassist
- Paul Turner (pastor) (died 1980), active in the integration of Clinton High School in Tennessee
- Paul Turner (referee), professional wrestling referee
- Paul E. Turner, evolutionary biologist
- Paul Turner, founder of RockShox and Maverick Bikes
- Paul Turner, character in Submarine Seahawk
