= Stephen Turner House =

Historic house in Massachusetts, United States

- U.S. National Register of Historic Places
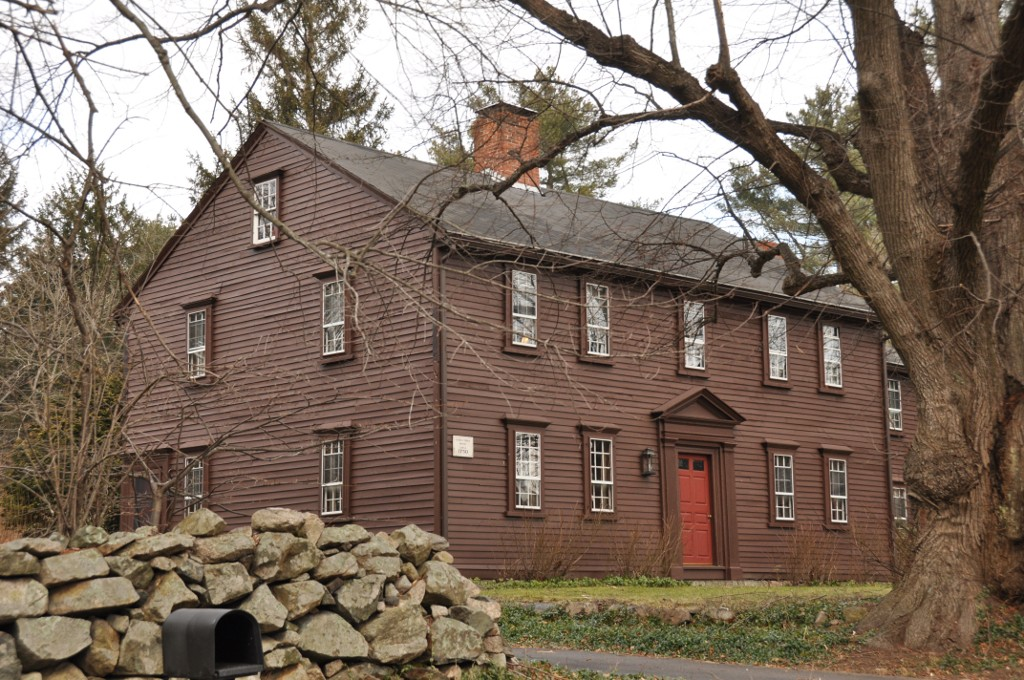

- Location within Massachusetts Location within the United States
- Nearest city: Norfolk, Massachusetts
- Coordinates: 42°8′45″N 71°18′32″W
- Built: 1712
- Architect: Turner, John
- Architectural style: Georgian
- NRHP reference No.: 79002682
- Added to NRHP: May 10, 1979

The Stephen Turner House is a historic house at 187 Seekonk St. in Norfolk, Massachusetts. The 2 1/2-story house was built sometime after the 1712 purchase of the land by Stephen Turner. His son Ichabod, an American Revolutionary War veteran, sold the house in 1792. The ell was added in 1812, and may be a separately-built structure of earlier construction. The house may also include beams from a 17th-century fortified house.

The house was listed on the National Register of Historic Places in 1979.

== See also ==
- National Register of Historic Places listings in Norfolk County, Massachusetts
