= Kyle Turner =

Kyle Turner may refer to:

- Kyle Turner (rugby league) (1992–2023), Australian rugby league footballer for South Sydney
- Kyle Turner (footballer) (born 1997), Scottish footballer for Raith Rovers

== See also ==
- Kylie Turner, fictional character from Coronation Street
