= Peter Turner =

Peter Turner may refer to:

- Peter Turner (writer and photographer) (1947–2005), London-born photographer and writer
- Peter Turner (physician) (1542–1614), English Paracelsian and Member of Parliament
- Peter Turner (mathematician) (1586–1652), English mathematician, son of the physician
- Pete Turner (musician) (born 1974), British musician and songwriter
- Pete Turner (photographer) (1934–2017), American photographer
- Peter Turner (Australian footballer) (born 1974), Australian rules footballer
- Peter Turner (Scottish footballer) (1876–1970), Scottish Association football player
- Peter Turner (rugby league), New Zealand rugby league international
- Peter H. Turner (1813–1885), American pioneer and politician
