= Ann Turner =

Ann Turner may refer to:

== People ==
- Ann Turner (writer) (born 1945), American children's author and poet
- Ann Turner (director) (born 1960), Australian film director and screenwriter
- Ann Turner (canoeist) (born 1956), American canoeist
- Ann Turner, "a half-blooded Miami" Indian noted in the 1818 Treaty of St. Mary's
- Ann Tennant ("Ann Turner" erron.), British 1875 murdered "witch" noted in the 1945 murder of Charles Walton
- Ann Turner Robinson (died 1741), née Turner, English 18th-century soprano
- Ann Turner Cook (1926–2022), née Turner, American educator, mystery writer, Gerber baby logo model
- Ann Turner Dillon, née Turner, American clubwoman, president general of the Daughters of the American Revolution

== Fiction ==
- Ann Turner, played by Dorothy Fay in the 1938 film The Stranger From Arizona

== See also ==
- Anne Turner (disambiguation)
- Anna Turner (disambiguation)
- Annie Turner Wittenmyer (1827–1900), née Turner, American charitable organization leader
