= Chris Turner (footballer, born 1959) =

New Zealand footballer

Personal information
- Full name: Christopher M Turner
- Date of birth: 13 March 1959 (age 67)
- Place of birth: Manurewa, New Zealand

Senior career*
Years	Team	Apps	(Gls)
- Manurewa

International career
1979–1980	New Zealand	8	(1)
- * Club domestic league appearances and goals

Chris Turner is a New Zealand former footballer who played as a midfielder. He played for the New Zealand national team at international level.

Turner scored on full All Whites debut in a 3–0 win over Fiji on 3 July 1979 and ended his international playing career with eight A-international caps and one goal to his credit, his final cap an appearance in a 6–1 win over Solomon Islands on 29 February 1980 before an injury to his knee ended his international career.
