= Christopher Turner =

Christopher Turner may refer to:

- Christopher J. Turner (1933–2014), governor of the Turks and Caicos and of Montserrat
- Christopher Turner (writer), British writer
- Kristopher Turner (born 1980), Canadian actor
- Christopher Turner (photographer), husband of writer Armistead Maupin

== See also ==
- Chris Turner (disambiguation)
- Christopher Turnor (disambiguation)
