= Fred Turner (botanist) =

Australian botanist (1852–1939)

Frederick Turner (17 April 1852 Burton Salmon, England – 17 October 1939 Chatswood, Australia) was an Australian botanist.

== Biography ==
He went to Australia in 1874, where he joined the staff of the Government Gardens at Brisbane and remained for five years, when he became botanist to the Department of Agriculture of New South Wales, and consulting botanist to the Western Australian government. He traveled over 60,000 miles throughout Australia botanizing. He made the study of botany popular in Australia and wrote on the subject for the press. He is the author of numerous works, many of which have been published by the government; translated into numerous foreign languages and republished at the expense of foreign governments. He is the holder of many medals and diplomas for economic botany. For several years he was engaged in the botanical survey of New South Wales.

== Works ==
- Grasses of New South Wales (1890)
- Indigenous Forage Plants of Australia (1891)
- Australian Grasses (1895)
- West Australian Grasses (1896)
- West Australian Salt Bushes (1897)
- Suspected Poison Plants of New South Wales (1890-1914)
- Noxious Exotic Weeds (1890-1913)
- New Commercial Crops for New South Wales (1890-1914)
