= Steve Turner =

Steve or Steven Turner may refer to:

== Sports ==
- Steve Turner (tennis) (born 1946), American professional tennis player and tennis coach
- Steve Turner (Australian rules footballer) (born 1960), Australian rules footballer
- Steve Turner (rugby league) (born 1984), Australian rugby league footballer
- Steve Turner, team owner of Turner Scott Motorsports
- Steven Turner (born 1987), Canadian football player

== Arts and entertainment ==
- Steve Turner (guitarist) (born 1965), American musician
- Steve Turner (writer), British music journalist, biographer and poet
- Steve Turner (game programmer), game music programmer and composer

== Others ==
- Steve Turner (journalist) (1930s–2016), British journalist and trade union leader
- Steve Turner (police commissioner) (born 1971), British police commissioner
- Steve Turner (trade unionist) (born 1962), British trade unionist

== See also ==
- Stephen Turner (disambiguation)
