= Joel Turner =

Joel Turner may refer to:

- Joel Turner (musician) (born 1987), Australian beatboxer
- Joel Turner (actor), Australian actor
- Joel Turner (mayor) (1820–1888), former mayor of Los Angeles, California
