= Benjamin Brecknell Turner =

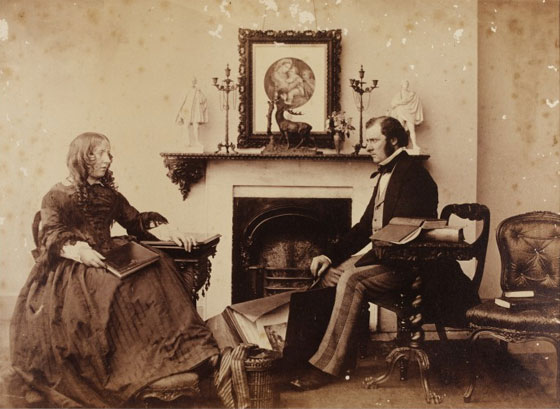
Benjamin and Agnes Brecknell Turner, England, V&A Museum no. PH.513-2003

Benjamin Brecknell Turner (1815–1894) was one of Britain's first photographers and a founding-member of the Photographic Society of London which was formed in 1853. His images were based on the traditionally 'picturesque' styles and subjects of the generation of watercolour painters before him.

Born in London, Turner was the eldest son in a family of eight children. The family lived above the family tallow-chandlers business where candles and saddle-soaps were made and sold. At sixteen Benjamin became an apprentice to his father. He joined the Worshipful Company of Tallow Chandlers in 1837 and became a Freeman of the City of London in 1838. On 17 August 1847, he married Agnes Chamberlain, a member of the Worcester China family.

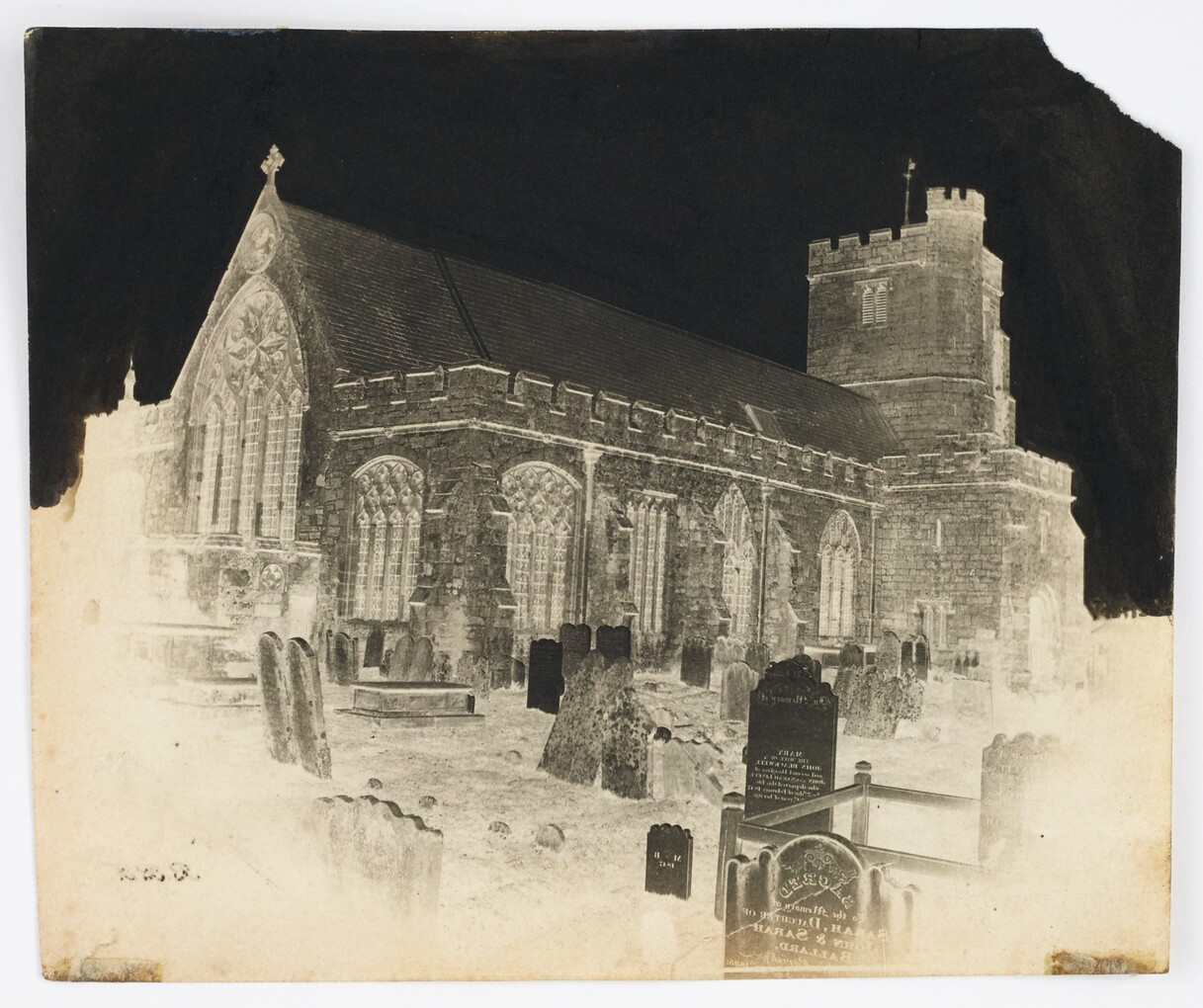
St. Laurence in Hawkhurst England by Benjamin Brecknell Turner, c. 1855. Department of Image Collections, National Gallery of Art Library.

In 1849 Turner took out a licence to practice paper negative (Calotype or Talbotype) photography from its inventor, William Henry Fox Talbot. He quickly mastered this form of photography and went on to produce many images during the 1850s, taking part in many photographic exhibitions during this time. He joined the Photographic Society, later the Royal Photographic Society, and was recorded as a member from 1854, although it is likely he joined in 1853 and remained a member until at least 1893, albeit with a break in membership between c.1871, rejoining in 1883. Brecknell's personal album from the Photographic Club, a grouping of members of the Photographic Society, is held in the Royal Photographic Society Collection at the Victoria and Albert Museum.

Between 1852 and 1854 Turner compiled 60 of his own photographs in what is believed to be a unique album, 'Photographic Views from Nature'. It might have been a sample book, a convenient method for presenting photographs for personal pleasure, and for showing to colleagues or potential exhibitors. It remained in the Turner family until it was bought by the Victoria and Albert Museum in London. Almost a third of the photographs in Turner's album are of scenes in the West Midlands county of Worcestershire. The village of Bredicot was the home of Turner's father-in-law, who had purchased Bredicot Court when he retired from the business of porcelain manufacture, a trade that had made him wealthy.

From the mid-1850s he worked in a 'glass house studio' above his London business premises. He made many portraits here although he seems never to have exhibited them. Although Turner is mainly known for his rural and architectural images he did also take portraits using his family and business as subjects. For these images he often used glass negatives as these had short exposure times allowing a high level of detail.

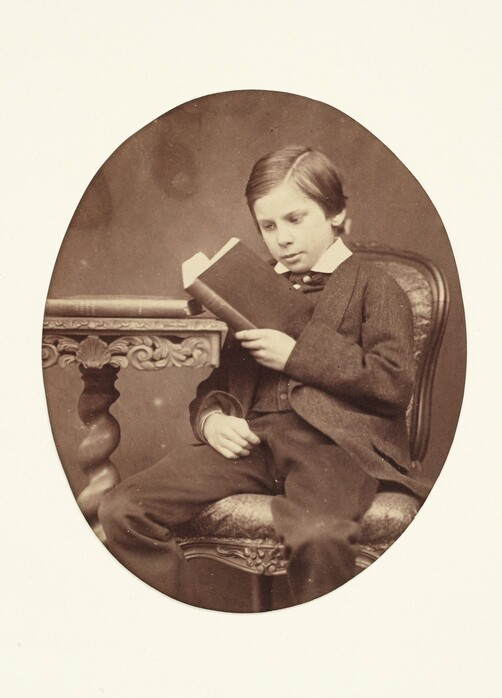
Portrait of Benjamin Brecknell Turner Jr. Reading by Benjamin Brecknell Turner, c. 1856. Department of Image Collections, National Gallery of Art Library.

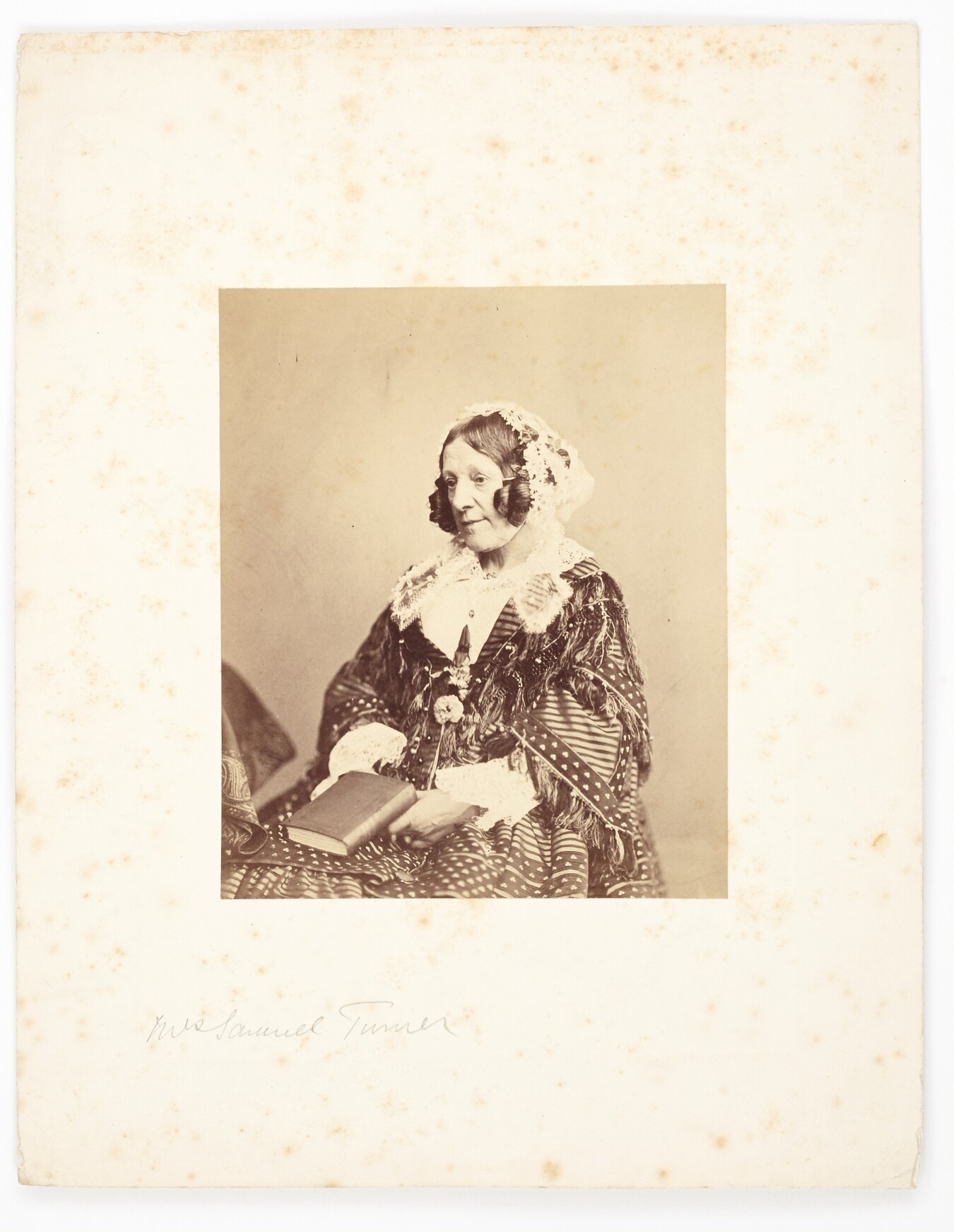
Portrait of Lucy Jane Fownes Turner by Benjamin Brecknell Turner, c. 1855. Department of Image Collections, National Gallery of Art Library.

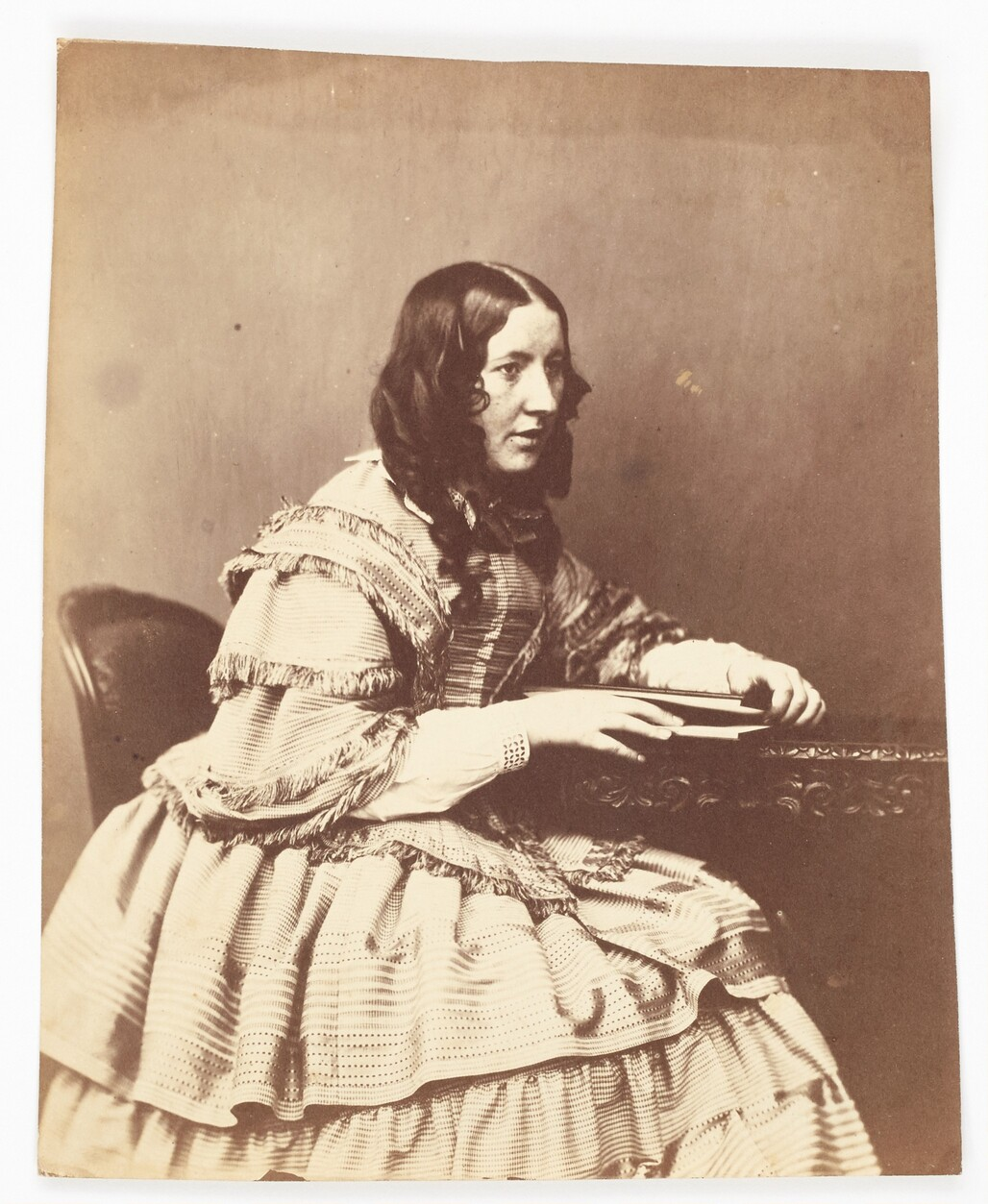
Agnes Chamberlain Turner by Benjamin Brecknell Turner, c. 1855. Department of Image Collections, National Gallery of Art Library.

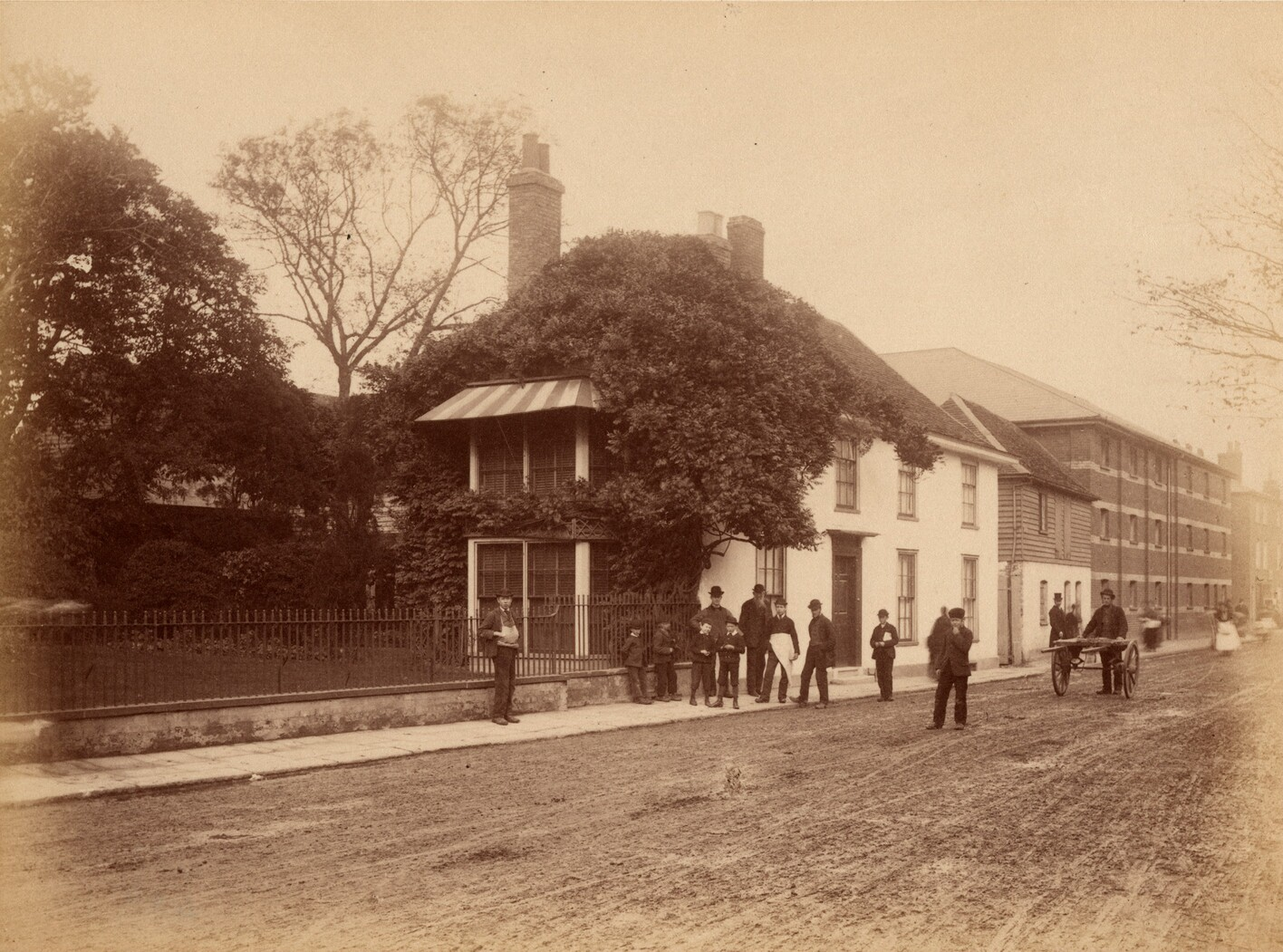
Gainsboroughs House in Sudbury England by Benjamin Brecknell Turner, c. 1855. Department of Image Collections, National Gallery of Art Library.

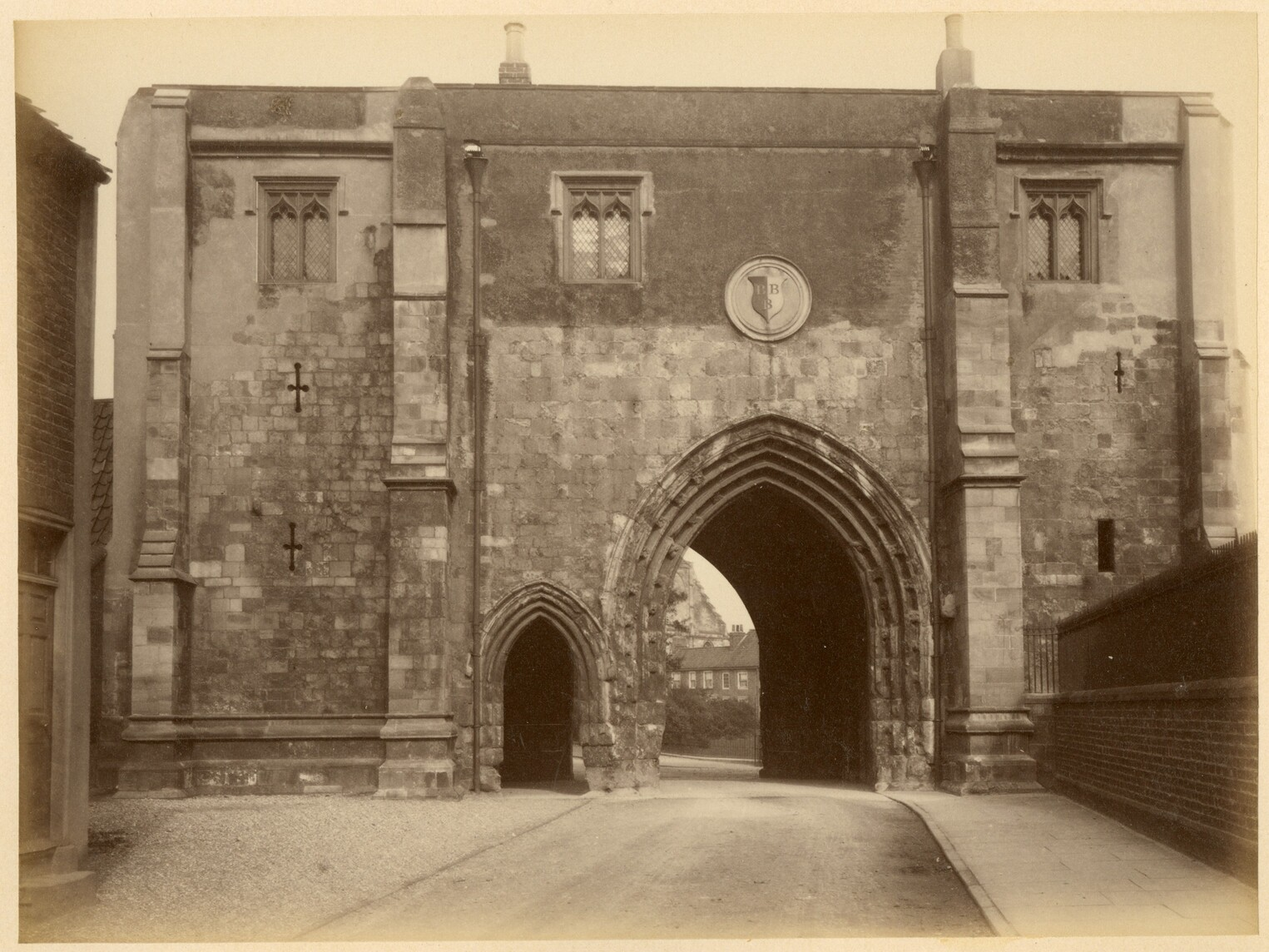
Bayte Gatehouse in Bridlington England by Benjamin Brecknell Turner, c. 1855. Department of Image Collections, National Gallery of Art Library.

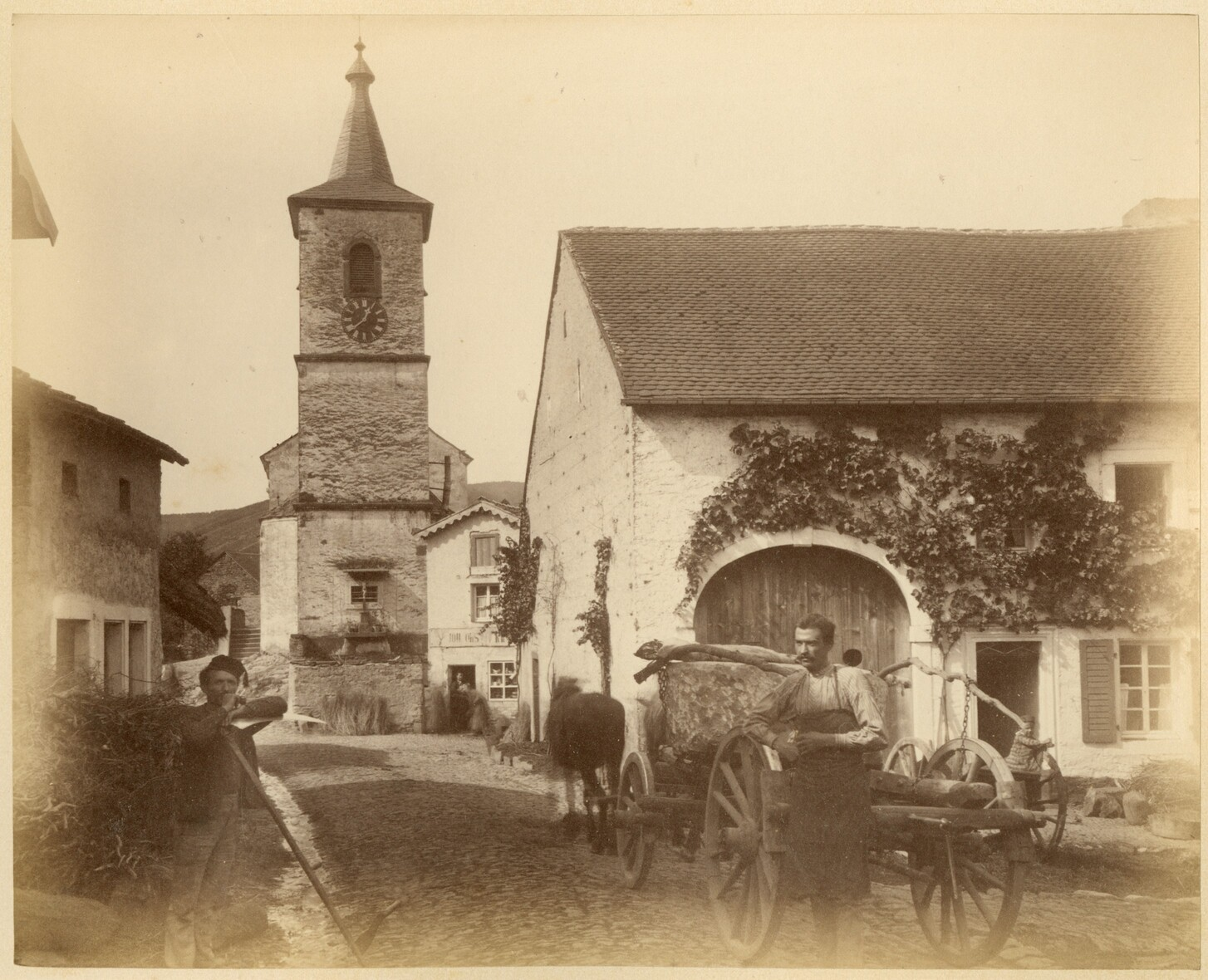
Church in Serrig Germany by Benjamin Brecknell Turner, c. 1855. Department of Image Collections, National Gallery of Art Library.

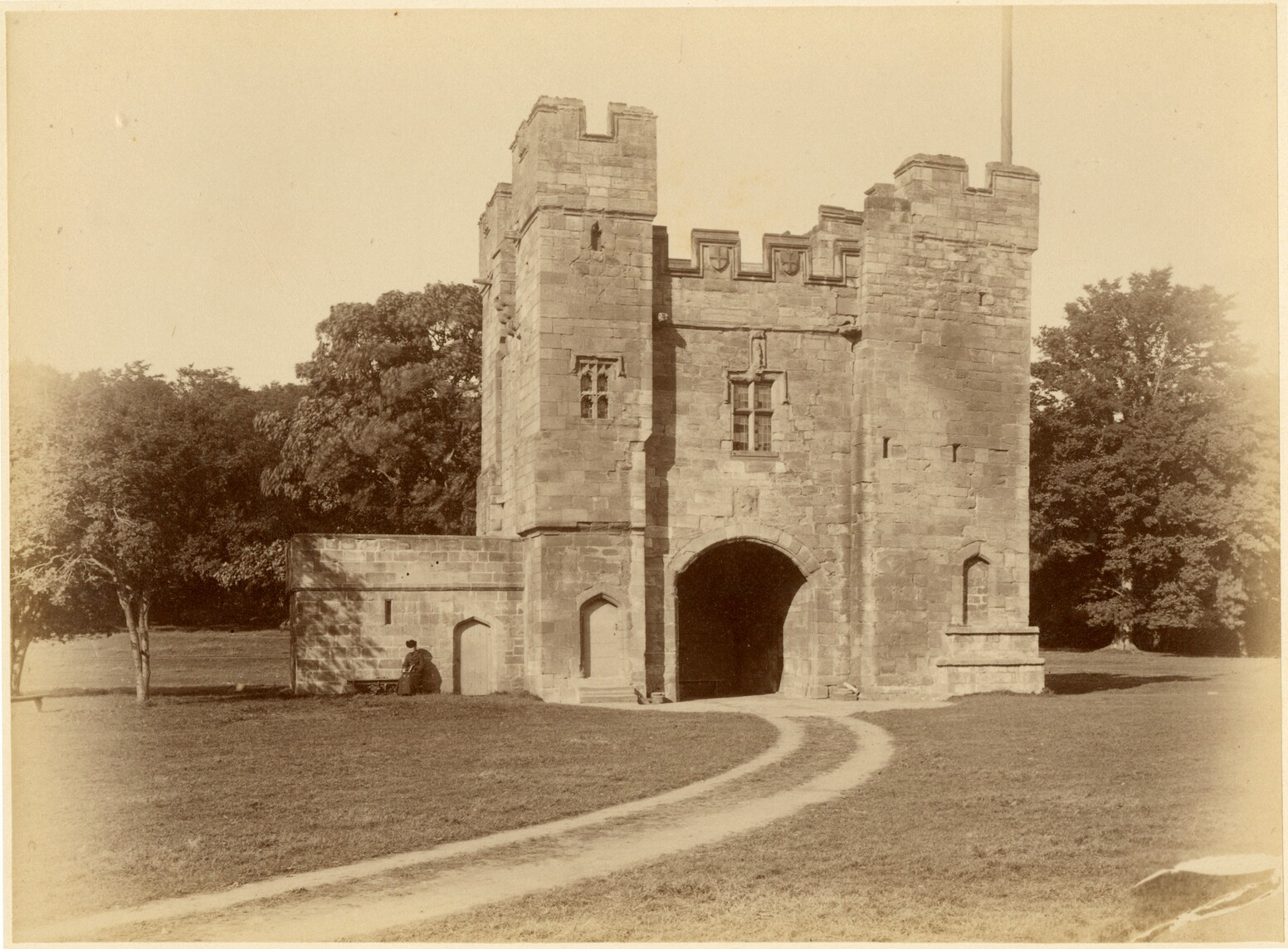
Alnwick Abbey England by Benjamin Brecknell Turner, c. 1855. Department of Image Collections, National Gallery of Art Library.

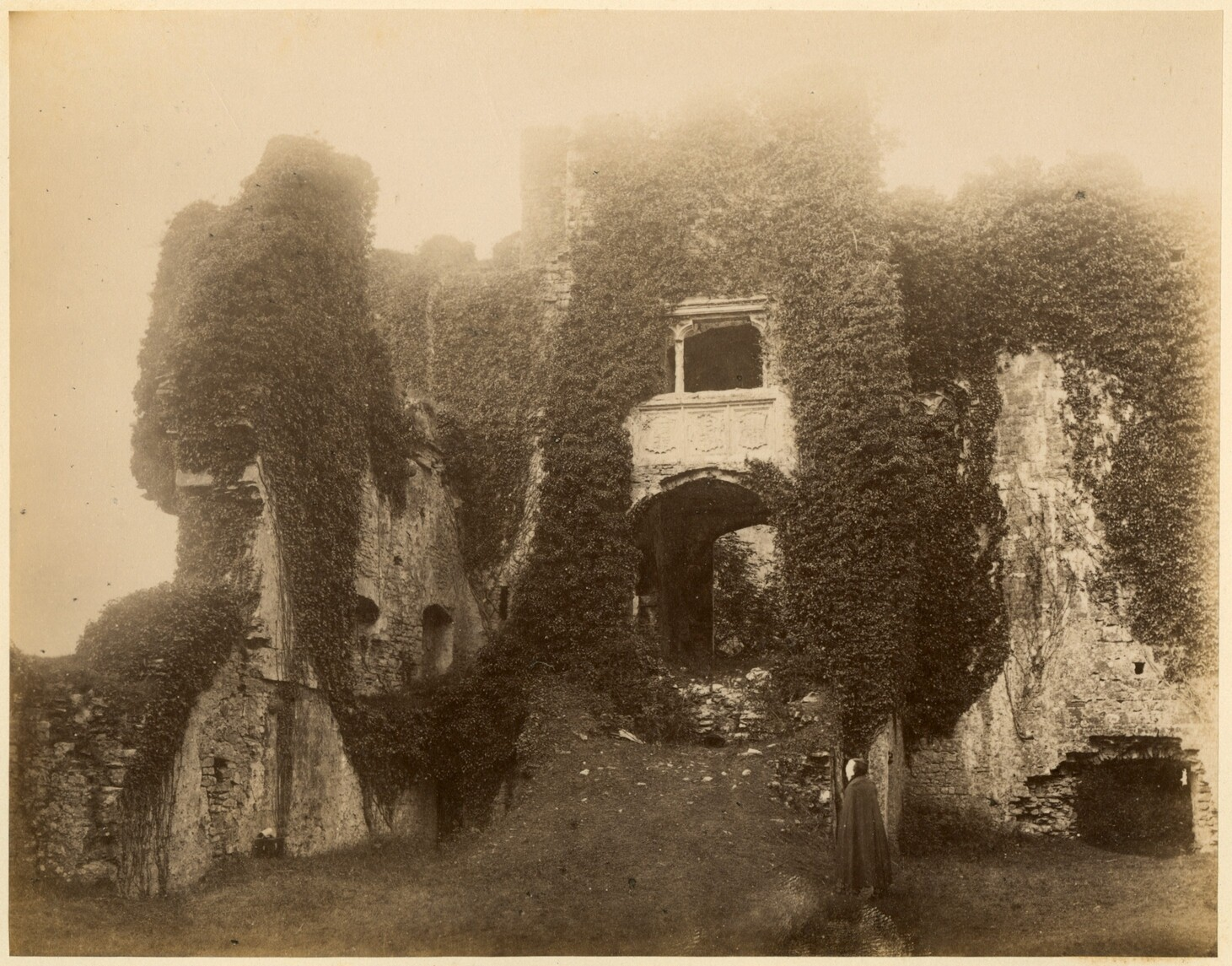
Dinefwr Castle in Wales by Benjamin Brecknell Turner, c. 1855. Department of Image Collections, National Gallery of Art Library.

== Collections ==
- Victoria and Albert Museum
- National Gallery of Art, Department of Image Collections
- National Media Museum
- Metropolitan Museum of Art
- National Galleries of Scotland
- National Portrait Gallery
- National Gallery of Canada

== Bibliography ==
- Barnes, Martin; Haworth-Booth, Mark; Daniel, R. Malcolm (2001). Benjamin Brecknell Turner: Rural England Through a Victorian Lens. V&A Publications. ISBN 1-85177-335-5
