= Stuart Turner =

Stuart Turner may refer to:

- Stuart Turner (baseball) (born 1991), American baseball player
- Stuart Turner (cricketer) (born 1943), English cricketer
- Stuart Turner (engineer) (1869–1920), English engineer
- Stuart Turner (musician), English alternative blues singer
- Stuart Turner (rugby union) (born 1972), rugby union player
- Stuart Turner (EastEnders), a fictional character
- Stuart Turner (The Bill), a fictional character
- Stuart Turner (company), British engineering company founded in 1906
