= Fred Turner (entrepreneur) =

British entrepreneur

- Born: West Yorkshire
- Education: University of Oxford
- Occupations: Scientist, Entrepreneur
- Known for: Founder of Curative

Fred Turner is a biotechnology entrepreneur and founder and CEO of Curative, Inc. He was featured in the Science Council list of top 100 practicing scientists in the UK in 2013 and was ranked #1 in the European Union Contest for Young Scientist in 2013. Turner was also featured on the 2017 Forbes 30 Under 30 in Science list.

== Early life and education ==
As a 17-year old, Fred won the UK's Young Engineer of the Year Award for building a PCR device intended to find the gene responsible for his brother's red hair. Turner went to Oxford to study biochemistry but dropped out.

== Career ==
Turner moved from the UK to San Francisco to found TL BioLabs, which made genetic tests for cow herds. TL was backed by the Thiel Foundation. The company pivoted and rebranded to Shield Bio, which had a focus on diagnostic testing for gonorrhea and sepsis. It was backed by a16z and Y-Combinator and the testing was made available to over 10,000 patients in medical centers.

Following Shield Bio's closing, Turner founded Curative to focus on improving outcomes for sepsis patients, but the company quickly turned focus to COVID-19 diagnostics in the wake of the COVID-19 pandemic.
