= Max Turner =

Max Turner may refer to:

- Max Turner (theologian), British New Testament scholar
- Max Turner (politician) (1947–2026), Australian politician, former member for Bendigo West
- Max Turner (footballer) (1911–1960), Australian footballer for Collingwood
- Max Turner (Coronation Street), a fictional character
- Max Turner (musician) (born 1980), Scottish-German vocalist, producer and songwriter
