= Christopher Turnor =

Christopher Turnor may refer to:

- Christopher Turnor (judge) (1607–1675), English judge in the time of Charles II
- Christopher Turnor (MP) (1809–1886), English Member of Parliament for South Lincolnshire
- Christopher Hatton Turnor (1873–1940), English architect and social reformer

== See also ==
- Christopher Turner (disambiguation)
