= Laura Turner =

Laura Turner may refer to:

- Laura Turner (sprinter) (born 1982), British track and field athlete
- Laura Turner (darts player) (born 1983), British darts player
- Laura Turner (singer), American singer
