= Edwin Turner =

Edwin Turner is the name of

- Edwin Turner (politician) (1849–1913)), Australian politician
- Edwin Turner (athlete) (1912–1968), American middle-distance runner

== See also ==
- Edwin Turney (1929–2008), American electrical engineer
