= Frank Turner (footballer) =

Australian rules footballer

Personal information
- Full name: Frank Eustace Turner
- Born: 31 July 1886; Port Melbourne, Victoria
- Died: 11 June 1963 (aged 76); Brooklyn, Victoria

Playing career^{1}
Years	Club	Games (Goals)
1910	St Kilda	1 (0)
- ^{1} Playing statistics correct to the end of 1910.

Frank Eustace Turner (31 July 1886 – 11 June 1963) was an Australian rules footballer who played with St Kilda in the Victorian Football League (VFL).
