= Benjamin F. Turner Sr. =

American mayor

Benjamin Franklin Turner Sr. (1873 – 25 May 1950) was the Mayor of Passaic, New Jersey. He was a city commissioner for Passaic, New Jersey, five times and was the director of parks and public improvements. Turner was first elected as a city commissioner for a four-year term. He died on May 25, 1950.
