= Francis Turner (cricketer, born 1894) =

English cricketer

Francis Irving Turner (3 September 1894 – 18 October 1954) was an English first-class cricketer, who played in five games for Yorkshire County Cricket Club in 1924.

Born in Barnsley, Yorkshire, England, Turner was a right-handed batsman and right arm medium pace bowler, who scored 33 runs with a highest score of 12, for an average of 4.71. He also took two catches. Turner played for Scotland in 1935. His brother, Cyril Turner, and nephew, Brian Turner, also played first-class cricket for Yorkshire.

Turner died in October 1954 in Killearn, Stirlingshire, Scotland, aged 60.
