= Michael Turner =

Michael or Mike Turner may refer to:

== Arts and entertainment ==
- Michael Le Vell (Michael Robert Turner, born 1964), English actor, plays Kevin Webster in Coronation Street
- Michael Turner (actor) (1921–2012), South African born actor who played numerous roles on British television
- Michael Turner (comics) (1971–2008), comic book artist and publisher known for his work on Witchblade and Fathom
- Michael Turner (illustrator) (1934–2025), British motorsport and aviation illustrator
- Michael Turner (musician) (born 1962), Canadian writer and musician from Vancouver, BC
- Mick Turner (born 1960), Australian musician and artist
- Mike Turner (musician) (born 1963), former and founding band member of alternative rock band Our Lady Peace
- Double K (American musician) (Michael Turner, 1977–2021), one half of hip-hop duo People Under the Stairs.

== Politics ==
- Mike Turner (Oklahoma politician) (born 1987), member of the Oklahoma House of Representatives
- Mike Turner (Tennessee politician) (born 1955), Tennessee politician in the Tennessee House of Representatives
- Mike Turner (born 1960), American politician from Ohio

== Sport ==
- Michael Turner (American football) (born 1982), American football running back
- Michael Turner (Australian rules footballer) (1954–2024), Australian rules footballer who played for the Geelong Football Club
- Mike Turner (cricketer) (1934–2015), English cricketer
- Michael Turner (footballer, born 1983), English footballer
- Mike Turner (footballer) (born 1938), English former football goalkeeper
- Michael Turner (swimmer) (1948–2020), British Olympic swimmer of the 1960s
- Michael Turner (water polo) (born 1951), Australian former water polo player
- Mike Turner (triple jumper) (born 1977), American triple jumper, 1999 All-American for the Purdue Boilermakers track and field team

== Other fields ==
- Michael Turner (banker) (1905–1980), chief manager of Hong Kong and Shanghai Bank from 1952 to 1963
- Michael Turner (businessman) (born 1948), former CEO of BAE Systems
- Michael S. Turner (born 1949), American cosmologist
- Sir Michael Turner (judge) (1931–2018), British barrister and judge
