= Roger Turner =

Roger Turner may refer to:

- Roger Turner (figure skater) (1901–1993), American figure skater
- Roger Turner (garden designer) (fl. 1980s–1990s), British garden designer
- Roger Turner (musician) (born 1946), English jazz percussionist
- Roger B. Turner, American Marine Corps general

== See also ==
- Roger Singleton-Turner (fl. 1970s–2000s), British television director
