= Charles Moffat Howe =

American mayor

Charles Moffat Howe (1851–1920) was a dentist and the Mayor of Passaic, New Jersey. He was mayor for four terms, and was president of Passaic National Bank, and president of the local YMCA.
