= D. J. Turner =

D. J. Turner may refer to:

- DJ Turner (cornerback) (born 2000), American football cornerback
- D. J. Turner (wide receiver) (born 1997), American football wide receiver
