= Brad Turner =

Brad Turner may refer to:

- Brad Turner (director), television director
- Brad Turner (ice hockey) (born 1968), former AHL/NHL hockey player
- Brad Turner, fictional character in the cartoon series M.A.S.K.
- Brad Turner (musician) (born 1967), Canadian jazz trumpeter
