= Neil Clifford Turner =

Australian agricultural scientist

Neil Clifford Turner (born 13 March 1940) is an Australian agricultural scientist known for his contributions to agronomy and crop physiology, particularly in the adaptation of crops to dry lands. He was the recipient of the Humboldt Research Award and the Centenary Medal for service to Australian society in environmental science. He is a member of the Order of Australia and his contributions spans physiological response of crops and trees to water deficits, rainfall-use efficiency, climate change implications for crop production, and various abiotic and biotic stress factors affecting plant growth and productivity.

Turner has authored and co-authored over 400 refereed scientific papers and book chapters, and he has edited 12 books and special issues of journals.

== Early life and education ==
Turner was born in Preston, England. He pursued his undergraduate studies in agricultural science at the University of Reading, graduating with a BSc (Hons) in 1962. He later obtained his PhD in agronomy from the University of Adelaide, Australia, in 1968, and a DSc in Agriculture from the University of Reading, UK, in 1983.

== Career ==
Turner served as a Crop and Tree Physiologist at the Department of Ecology and Climatology, The Connecticut Agricultural Experiment Station, New Haven, Connecticut, USA, from 1967 to 1974. He then transitioned to roles in Australia, including positions at CSIRO Plant Industry in Canberra and Perth.

Since 2005, Turner has been based at the University of Western Australia as Interim Director of the Centre for Legumes in Mediterranean Agriculture (2006–2007) and adjunct professor in the UWA Institute of Agriculture.

Turner's leadership roles include being a Research/Program Leader and Officer-in-Charge at the Dryland Crops and Soils Research Unit, CSIRO Plant Industry, Perth, Western Australia, from 1984 to 1995. He has also held visiting research professor positions at University of Aberdeen (1973), Bayreuth University (1982), Würzburg University (1993), Lanzhou University, China (2007-), Northwest Agricultural and Forestry University, China (2017-).

== Research ==
Throughout his career, Turner's research interests have focused on agronomic and physiological responses of crops and trees to water deficits, adaptation of crops to water-limited environments, rainfall-use efficiency, climate change impacts on crop production, stomatal behavior, plant water relations, drought and salinity tolerance, osmotic adjustment, high and low temperature stress, and early vigor. He has worked extensively with crops and trees, including wheat, oats, lupin, chickpea, maize, rice, sorghum, tobacco, cotton, soybean, sunflowers, and several Brassica species.

== Contributions ==
Turner has served as a UNESCO/FAO consultant at the UNDP Centre for Soil and Water Management, Haryana Agricultural University, Hisar, India (1978), and as a Visiting Research Scientist at the International Rice Research Institute, Los Baños, Philippines (1983). Turner contributed with organizations such as the International Centre for Research in Agroforestry (now World Agroforestry Center) and the International Crop Science Congress.

== Honors and awards ==
Turner received fellowships from the American Society of Agronomy, the Crop Science Society of America, the Australian Academy of Technological Sciences and Engineering, the Australian Institute of Agricultural Science and Technology and the Indian Academy of Agricultural Sciences. He was awarded the Humboldt Research Award, the Centenary Medal for service to Australian society in environmental science, and the Chancellor's Medal from The University of Western Australia, among others.

In 2021, Turner was appointed as a Member of the Order of Australia (AM) for his service to agricultural and environmental science, and to education.

== Personal life ==
Neil Turner is married with three adult married sons and eight grandchildren. He resides in Waterman's Bay, Western Australia.
