= Bruce Turner (disambiguation) =

Bruce Turner (1922–1993) was an English jazz musician.

Bruce Turner may also refer to:

- Bruce Turner (field hockey) (1930-2010), New Zealand field hockey player and cricketer
- Bruce I. Turner, American diplomat
