= Hugh Turner (footballer, born 1917) =

English footballer (1917–1992)

Personal information
- Full name: Hugh Peter Turner
- Date of birth: 12 May 1917
- Place of birth: Middlesbrough, England
- Date of death: 1992 (aged 74)
- Place of death: Central Cleveland, (Note: Turner's death was registered in March 1992, in the Central Cleveland registration district of Yorkshire, which covers Middlesbrough, Redcar, Stockton-on-Tees and surrounding area.) England
- Height: 5 ft 11 in (1.80 m)
- Position: Full back

Senior career*
Years	Team	Apps	(Gls)
–	South Bank St Peters	0	(0)
1935–1939	Middlesbrough	0	(0)
1939–1947	Darlington	6	(0)
- * Club domestic league appearances and goals

Hugh Peter Turner (12 May 1917 – 1992), also known as Hughie Turner, was an English footballer who played as a full back in the Football League for Darlington.

== Biography ==
Turner was born in 1917 in Middlesbrough, which was then in the North Riding of Yorkshire. He began his football career as a wing half with local team South Bank St Peters, turned professional with First Division club Middlesbrough in 1935, and remained with the club for four seasons, during which time he was converted to play at right back. He played for Middlesbrough's "A" team in the North Eastern League, but never managed to break into the senior team, and left for Darlington in August 1939.

Described as "a sound defender [who] has a strong kick", Turner was not selected for any of Darlington's three matches in the Third Division North before the Football League was abandoned for the duration of the Second World War. He returned to Darlington for the first postwar season, but made only six appearances in the League before retiring from the game.

Turner died in 1992 at the age of 74.
