= Graeme Turner (disambiguation) =

Graeme Turner (1947–2025) was an Australian academic.

Graeme Turner or Graham Turner may also refer to:

- Graeme Turner (cricketer) (born 1964), Rhodesian-born South African cricketer
- Graham Turner (born 1947), English footballer

== See also ==
- Graham Turner Perry (1894–1960), American lawyer and activist
