= Philip Turner =

Philip or Phil Turner may refer to:

- Philip Turner (writer) (1925–2006), English writer
- Philip J. Turner (1876–1943), architect and educator
- Philip Turner (diplomat) (born 1960), New Zealand Ambassador to Korea (2018-present)
- Phil Turner (politician), British politician
- Phil Turner (footballer, born 1962), English football player
- Phil Turner (footballer, born 1927) (1927–2014), English football inside forward
