= Herbert Turner =

Herbert Turner may refer to:

- Herbert Turner (bishop) (1888–1968), British bishop
- Herbert Hall Turner (1861–1930), British astronomer and seismologist
- Herbert Arthur Frederick Turner (1919–1998), British economist, statistician, and academic
- Herbert Turner (footballer born 1899) (1899–1953), English footballer who played for Merthyr Town, Coventry City, Torquay United and Bristol Rovers
- Herbert Turner (footballer born 1909) (1909–1981), Welsh international footballer who played for Charlton Athletic
- Herb Turner (Australian footballer) (1921–2002), Australian rules footballer
- Herb Turner (rower) (1910–1998), Australian Olympic rower

== See also ==
- Herbert Turner Jenkins (1907–1990), American law enforcer
- Bert Turner (disambiguation)
