= Captain Turner =

Captain Turner may refer to:

== Characters ==
- Naomi Turner's father in Elena of Avalor
- Will Turner in Pirates of the Caribbean (film series)

== People ==
- Glenn Turner (cricketer) (born 1947), captain of New Zealand cricket team
- Harry Turner (American football) (died 1914), captain of American football team
- Isaac Turner
- Norman Turner
- William Thomas Turner (1856–1933), captain of RMS Lusitania
