= Anne Turner =

Anne Turner may refer to:

- Anne Turner (murderer) (1576–1615), English maidservant convicted of the murder of Sir Thomas Overbury
- Anne Milton (born Anne Turner, 1955), British politician, MP and minister
- Anne Turner allotments and playing fields, UK, home of the Cricket Club of North Ferriby
- Anne Turner, a fictional character in Sheena Porter's 1964 novel Nordy Bank

== See also ==
- Ann Turner (disambiguation)
- Anna Turner (disambiguation)
