= Alan Turner =

Alan Turner may refer to:

- Alan Turner (cricketer) (born 1950), former Australian cricketer
- Alan Turner (gridiron football) (born 1984), American and Canadian football wide receiver
- Alan Turner (Emmerdale), a fictional character on the British soap opera Emmerdale
- Alan Turner (singer), a contestant on series 6 of UK X Factor in 2008
- Alan Turner (long jumper), winner of the 1991 long jump at the NCAA Division I Indoor Track and Field Championships and coach of the University of Notre Dame track and field team

== See also ==
- Allan Turner, Tolkien scholar
