= Albert Turner =

Albert Turner may refer to:

- Albert Turner (footballer, born 1901) (1901–1985), English footballer
- Albert Turner (footballer, born 1907) (1907–1959), English footballer
- Albert Turner (activist) (1936–2000), American civil rights advocate

== See also ==
- Bert Turner (disambiguation)
