= Kenneth Turner =

Australian writer and professor

Kenneth Irving Turner (1928-2018) was one of the main contributors to the study of New South Wales and Australian politics in the postwar period. This contribution was acknowledged when the University of Sydney awarded him an Honorary D Litt in 2008. He was appointed a member of the Order of Australia (AM) in 2012.

== Early life ==
Ken Turner was born in Sydney on 14 August 1928. He was educated at a private infants school, then Earlwood Public School and Canterbury Boys High School. In 1945 he received a Department of Education scholarship to undertake an Arts degree at the University of Sydney. Graduating in 1948, he taught at Maitland Boys High School and at Newtown Technical School. He continued his University studies part-time and was awarded a B.Ec. in 1956 and M.Ec. in 1966. In 1958 he married Lorna McKenzie. They have two children, Robert (1960), and Catherine (1963).

== Academic career ==
From 1957 to 1961 Turner lectured at Sydney Teachers’ College, while also undertaking some tutorials and lectures at the University’s Department of Government. In late 1961, Turner was appointed to the Government Department as senior tutor and became a lecturer in 1963. He was promoted to senior lecturer and then to associate professor.

Ken Turner followed in the footsteps of Professors Henry Mayer and RN Spann in fostering the study of Australian and NSW politics. Much important new work resulted in what was then a neglected area. Turner’s main interests were the study of parliament, elections and political parties. His 1969 House of Review? was a ground-breaking study of the NSW Legislative Council and the theory of bicameralism. When the Council was being reformed in the 1970s, Turner appeared before a Parliamentary Committee as an expert witness. With other colleagues, he made an influential contribution to the design of the scheme of public funding for elections adopted in NSW

In 1985 came The Wran Model, another Department of Government project which Turner facilitated and co-edited (with Ernie Chaples and Helen Nelson). It remains the definitive account of NSW politics and elections in the 1970s and 80s. For many years Turner worked in the field of labour history. This resulted in A History of the Australian Labor Party in NSW, 1891–1991, co-authored with his long-time friend and collaborator Professor James Hagan. It was a model for such studies and added new insights by adopting a regional approach.

As well as leaving an important legacy of published works, Turner played a major role as a teacher and mentor. For many decades, he taught first year Government at the University of Sydney and influenced generations of undergraduates. He was always generous in sharing his compendious knowledge and providing students and colleagues with ideas.

Turner succeeded Professors Henry Mayer and Dick Spann as head of the Government Department, a position he held from 1974 to 1981. His common sense and wisdom were much valued at a turbulent time. Turner also made a major contribution to the University as a whole as an administrator, sitting on important committees. He was for many years sub-dean of the Faculty of Economics, eventually becoming dean.

== Retirement and after ==
Turner retired at the end of 1988 but remained active as a researcher and writer. He became an Honorary research associate in the Government Department. In the 1990s, Turner was a key contributor to a joint project between the NSW Parliament and Sydney University which culminated in The People’s Choice: electoral politics in twentieth century NSW (edited by David Clune and Michael Hogan).

In 2001, Premier Bob Carr appointed Turner to the Sesquicentenary of Responsible Government in NSW Committee. He played an influential role on the Committee and in three major Sesquicentenary works: The Premiers of NSW, 1856–2005 (co-edited with David Clune); The Worldly Art of Politics (co-edited with Michael Hogan); and The Governors of NSW, 1788–2010 (co-edited with David Clune). At the launch of the two volumes on the Premiers, former NSW Premier Neville Wran described Turner as 'the doyen of Labor historians' and commented that his grasp of history 'permeates every page'. Turner subsequently served on the Governor Macquarie Bicentenary Committee in 2010.

Ken Turner died on 23 May 2018.

== Bibliography ==
Editor, Guide to the Records of the New South Wales Branch of the Australian Labor Party, 1956–1969, Archives Authority of New South Wales, 1976; Revised Edition, 1989.

Co-Editor, The Governors Of New South Wales,1788–2010, Federation Press, 2010.

Co-Editor, The Worldly Art Of Politics, Federation Press, 2006.

Co-editor, The Premiers of New South Wales, Volume 1, 1856–1901, Federation Press, 2006.

Co-editor, The Premiers of New South Wales, Volume 2, 1901–2005, Federation Press, 2006.

Co-editor, The Wran Model: Electoral Politics in New South Wales,1981–1984, Allen and Unwin, 1985.

Co-editor, Guide to the Records of the New South Wales Division of the Liberal Party,1945–1970, Library Council of New South Wales, 1976.

Author, Book Chapters, The People's Choice: Electoral politics in 20th-century New South Wales, Federation Press, 2001.

Author, House Of Review? The New South Wales Legislative Council, 1934–1968; Sydney University Press, 1969.

Co-author, A History of the Labor Party in New South Wales, 1891–1991, Longman Cheshire, 1991.
