= Daisy Turner =

American storyteller

Daisy Turner

Daisy Turner (June 21, 1883 – February 8, 1988) was an American storyteller and poet. Born in Grafton, Vermont, to former slaves, she became famous late in life for her oral recordings of her family's history, which can be traced back to Africa and England.

== Biography ==
Daisy Turner's enslaved father, Alexander Turner, escaped from his plantation at the start of the Civil War, and joined the 1st New Jersey Cavalry of the Union Army. In the spring of 1863, Turner guided his regiment to his old plantation in Port Royal, Virginia, where he killed his former overseer. After military service, he returned to New England where he worked as a logger. He and his wife Sally had a homestead in Grafton, Vermont, where they raised 16 children.

Daisy Turner was a well-known community figure from childhood to her death at the age of 104. She is remembered as a known storyteller and family historian. The Turner family homestead, where they raised 13 children, is located on the "Daisy Turner Loop", a biking trail near Grafton Pond.

Turner was a "striking beauty in her youth, with high cheekbones and deep-set eyes" and led an exciting life, many of the details of which have been recorded carefully. Daisy can be seen reciting Civil War poetry, aged 104, in Ken Burns' PBS documentary, The Civil War. One of Turner's favorite personal stories, which she recounted often, involved a school pageant when Turner was about eight years old. In the pageant, Turner's teacher had instructed Turner to recite a poem with a black doll, but at the last minute, Turner resisted and spontaneously made up her own poem. This story became the subject of a children's book by Michael Medearis and Angela Shelf Medearis, and receives scholarly attention in Racial Innocence: Performing American Childhood from Slavery to Civil Rights, by Robin Bernstein. Daisy Turner's story continues to attract wide attention as part of an effort to preserve the folk history of Vermont and the United States.
