= John Turner (disambiguation) =

John Turner (1929–2020) was the 17th Prime Minister of Canada.

John Turner may also refer to:

== Arts and architecture ==
- John Turner (1737–1787), English potter of the Turner family
- John Turner (architect) (1806–1890), English architect
- John Doman Turner (1873–1938), British painter and member of the Camden Town Group
- John F. C. Turner (1927–2023), British architect and housing theorist

== Entertainment ==
- John Turner (lyricist) (1902–1982), English lyricist
- John Turner (actor) (born 1932), British actor
- John Turner (recorder player) (born 1943), British recorder player
- John Hastings Turner (1891–1956), English novelist, dramatist and theatre director
- "Uncle" John Turner (1933–2007), American drummer of Johnny Winter Band
- John Nathan-Turner né John Turner (1947–2002), British television producer
- John Turner, Canadian comedic actor associated with the clown duo Mump and Smoot

== Politicians ==
- Sir John Turner, 3rd Baronet, British Member of Parliament for King's Lynn in 1739–1768
- John W. Turner (Dakota Territory politician) (1800–1883), American territorial politician
- John Sargent Turner (1826–1900), Queensland politician
- John Herbert Turner (1834–1923), Canadian politician
- John Mouat Turner (1900–1945), Canadian politician
- John Melville Turner (1922–2013), Canadian politician
- John F. Turner (born 1942), American environment politician
- John Garth Turner (born 1949), Canadian journalist, broadcaster, and politician
- John Turner (Australian politician) (born 1949), New South Wales politician
- John Turner (Illinois politician) (born 1956), American politician and judge
- John Turner (Texas politician) (born 1974), Texas state representative
- John Turner (Massachusetts politician) (1712–1794), delegate to the first Massachusetts Provincial Congress

== Religion ==
- John Turner (archdeacon of Taunton) (died 1817), English Anglican priest, archdeacon of Taunton
- John Turner (bishop) (died 1831), Anglican bishop
- John Turner (archdeacon of Basingstoke) (1867–1952), English Anglican priest, archdeacon of Winchester
- John D. Turner (1938–2019), American professor of religious studies

== Science and medicine ==
- John William Turner (1790–1835), Scottish surgeon
- John P. Turner (1884–1950), African American surgeon and hospital administrator
- John Stewart Turner (1908–1991), Australian botanist and plant physiologist
- John Turner (psychologist) (1947–2011), British social psychologist

== Sportspeople ==
- John Turner (cricketer, born 1816) (1816–1892), Cambridge University cricketer and clergyman
- John Turner (cricketer, born 1854) (1854–1912), English cricketer
- John Turner (cricketer, born 1863) (1863–1924), Cambridge University cricketer and lawyer
- John Turner (cricketer, born 1879) (1879–1963), Scottish cricketer and educator
- John Turner (cricketer, born 2001)
- John Turner (Minor Counties cricketer) (1949–2012), English cricketer
- John Turner (Oxford University cricketer) (1816–1858), English cricketer and clergyman
- John Turner (1890s footballer), English football player for Manchester United
- John Turner (footballer, born 1913) (1913–1979), English footballer for Leeds United and Mansfield Town
- John Turner (footballer, born 1954), English football goalkeeper
- John Turner (American football) (born 1956), former National Football League player
- John Turner (basketball) (born 1967), American former basketball player
- John Turner (footballer, born 1986), English football forward

== Other people ==
- John Turner (Mayflower passenger) (c. 1590–1651)
- John Turner (fl. 1668–1676), New England merchant for whom the House of the Seven Gables in Salem, Massachusetts was built
- John Turner (miser) (1800–1883), English draper, landlord, moneylender and miser
- John Turner (fur trapper) (1807–1847), American fur trapper and investor in the Willamette Cattle Company
- John Wesley Turner (1833–1899), U.S. Army officer and Union Army general
- John Mosely Turner (1856–1968), British supercentenarian
- John Turner (naval officer) (1864–1949), Australian naval officer
- John Turner (anarchist) (1865–1934), British anarchist and trade union leader
- John Kenneth Turner (1879–1948), American publisher
- John Frayn Turner (1923–2015), British author specializing in military history
- John Christopher Turner (born 1947), American who fought the Soviets in Afghanistan and later saved people from a Taliban attack
- John B. Turner (1860–1937), American attorney and judge
- John Evan Turner (1875–1947), Welsh idealist philosopher and writer

== Fictional ==
- John Turner, a character in the 1891 Sherlock Holmes short story "The Boscombe Valley Mystery"

== See also ==
- Jack Turner (disambiguation)
- Jonathan Turner (disambiguation)
