= Animal Problems =

Children's book series by Jory John

Animal Problems is a children's book series by Jory John, illustrated by Lane Smith, and published by Random House Books for Young Readers. The series includes three books: Penguin Problems (2016), Giraffe Problems (2018), and Cat Problems (2021).

The books have received starred reviews from The Horn Book, Kirkus Reviews, Booklist, Publishers Weekly, and School Library Journal.

== Penguin Problems (2016) ==
Penguin Problems, published September 27, 2016, is a comedic picture book about the struggles penguins face in Antarctica.

The book received starred reviews from The Horn Book and Kirkus Reviews, as well as the following accolades:

- Junior Library Guild selection
- Beehive Award Nominee (2019)
- Prairie Bloom Book Award Nominee (2018-2019)
- Bank Street College of Education Best Children's Books of the Year (2017)
- Kirkus Prize for Young Readers Nominee (2016)
- The Irish Times Best Children's Books of the Year (2016)

== Giraffe Problems (2018) ==
Giraffe Problems, published September 25, 2018, is a comedic picture book about a self-conscious giraffe.

The book received starred reviews from Booklist, Publishers Weekly, and School Library Journal, as well as the following accolades:

- Junior Library Guild Selection
- Bill Martin, Jr. Picture Book Award Nominee (2020)
- MRLS Cream of the Crop (2019)

== Cat Problems (2021) ==
Cat Problems, published August 3, 2021, is a comedic picture book about a pampered house cat.

The book received a starred review from Booklist, as well as the following accolades:

- IndieBound National Bestseller
- IndieNext List Pick (2021)
