= Jonathan Turner =

Jonathan Turner may refer to:

- Jonathan Baldwin Turner (1805–1899), American educational reformer
- Jonathan H. Turner (born 1942), American sociologist
- Jonathan S. Turner (born 1953), American computer scientist
- Jonathan D. C. Turner (born 1958), British barrister
- Jon Turner, British yacht builder
- Jonathan Turner (Boy Meets World), a character in Boy Meets World

== See also ==
- John Turner (disambiguation)
