= School Stream =

Mobile app

- Type: Private
- Industry: Education
- Headquarters: Byron Bay
- Key people: Melissa Bridson
- Website: www.schoolstream.com.au

School Stream is an Australian company that produced the School Stream mobile app that enables its users to receive information about their school. The app received press coverage throughout 2013 and 2014 and is available from the Apple and Google app stores.

== History ==
School Stream was founded by Melissa Bridson in 2013 and the app was officially launched in late 2013. It quickly gained media attention in the first half of 2014. The app has also been the subject of scrutiny by the Education Review at the parent-teacher app conference. In June 2014, the app was being rolled out to more than 1,200 Catholic primary school principals in a bid to help cut down the amount of administrative work involved in keeping members of the Australian Catholic Primary Principals Association up-to-date with school related information.

School Stream has been tested by a number of different schools since its launch in 2013, including Preshil independent school in Kew.

== Features ==
School Stream is aimed at schools and parents of school age children, allowing both parties to keep better track of school news and information that is usually passed on from a school to a parent by the child. The app enables schools to notify parents about general information, events and excursions, to share newsletters and to send digital permission slips.

Schools purchase a licence for the app which gives them access to all of its features. Parents can sign up for the app and access the information from multiple schools without the need for different logins
