= Something Wrong =

Something Wrong may refer to:

- Something Wrong (album), an album by Bang Gang
- "Something Wrong", a song from Camouflage's album Relocated
- "Something Wrong", a song from Dash and Will's album Up in Something
- "Something Wrong", a song from Angel Witch's album Frontal Assault
- "Something Wrong", a song by Wonderboom (band)
- "Something Wrong", a song by Papa Vegas
- "Something Wrong", a song by Chicane's album Easy To Assemble (commercially unreleased)

== Other uses ==
- Something Wrong, a novel by E. Nesbit
- Something Wrong, a novel by James Stern

== See also ==
- Something's Wrong (disambiguation)
