= Jack Turner =

Jack Turner may refer to:

- Jack Turner (footballer, born 1992), English professional footballer
- Jack Turner (footballer, born 2002), English professional footballer
- Jack Turner (racing driver) (1920–2004), American racecar driver with the moniker "Cactus Jack"
- Jack Turner (Australian footballer) (1926–2016), played for Richmond in the 1940s
- Jack Turner (photographer) (1889–1989), war photographer from Prince Edward Island, Canada
- Jack Turner (writer) (born 1968), Australian non-fiction writer and television documentary host
- Jack Turner (author) (born before 1975), American author of several books concerning nature and wildlife
- Jack Turner (basketball, born 1930) (1930–2014), American NBA basketball player
- Jack Turner (basketball, born 1939) (1939–2013), American NBA basketball player
- Jack Turner (field hockey) (born 1997), English field hockey player
- Jack Turner, minor character in SNK's Art of Fighting series
- Jack Turner, a character in The Nickel Boys
- Jack Turner, a nickname used by Andrew Jackson Turner (1832–1905), a Wisconsin politician
- Jack Turner, founder of Turner Sports Cars, a British automobile manufacturer
- Jack Turner (boxer) (born 2002), English boxer
- Jack Turner (decathlete), British multi-event athlete

== See also ==
- John Turner (disambiguation)
- Jackie Turner, English boxer
- Jackie Turner (Home and Away), Home and Away minor character
