= Giraffe Problems =

2018 children's book

- Author: Jory John
- Illustrator: Lane Smith
- Publisher: Random House Books for Young Readers
- Publication date: September 25, 2018
- Pages: 42
- ISBN: 9781524772031

Giraffe Problems is a 2018 children's book written by Jory John and illustrated by Lane Smith. It is a comedic picture book about a self-conscious giraffe. John and Smith also wrote Penguin Problems (2016) and Cat Problems (2021).

== Reception ==
Giraffe Problems was mostly well received by critics, including starred reviews from Booklist, Publishers Weekly, and School Library Journal.

Multiple reviewers praised John's writing, which Deborah Stevenson, writing for The Bulletin of the Center for Children's Books, called "wry and funny" and "highly performable, with lots of comic formality of language punctuated—or sometime punctured—by humorous bathos". Publishers Weekly highlighted how the "lighthearted palaver [...] flows effortlessly". School Library Journal's Lisa Taylor noted how John and Smith "bring their zany brand of comedy" to Penguin Problems.

Reviewers also highlighted Smith's illustrations, which Beck Lockwood, writing for The School Librarian, called "witty and beautifully textured". Publishers Weekly noted how Smith's "characters’ black eyes convey a wealth of emotions". Booklist's John Peters wrote,

Never one to let an opportunity for caricature go to waste, Smith stretches Edward’s neck to comical length in the brushy illustrations, decks it with neckties and shrubbery, and then after sending it sinuously spiraling and flopping through various scenes, shows on a climactic foldout that it’s the perfect length to reach a bunch of bananas on a tall tree. That it’s just right for a giraffe is a notion that Edward, not to mention young readers with self-consciousness issues of their own, will have no trouble swallowing.

School Library Journal's Taylor also noted that the book "would lend itself perfectly to dramatic interpretation or an art lesson in sponge or block printing."

While multiple reviewers discussed the book's central message, Lockwood wrote on this at length, saying, "There is lots to talk about in this book, from understanding self-consciousness to recognising our tendency to desire precisely the characteristics we do not have. [...] Jory John’s story offers a breezy view of these issues as well as some endearingly elegant and polite dialogue between Edward and Cyrus.We learn that friendship can spring up in the unlikeliest of places, that it is possible to forget your own problems and help others – and that everyone can look good in a bow tie."

Kirkus Reviews, however, encouraged readers to "skip this stretch of a story and seek out stronger friendship titles instead". They specifically noted that John "missed out on a STEM opportunity by failing to introduce animal nomenclature, simply labeling the animals Edward believes are staring at him [...] as simply 'This guy,' 'That guy,' and so forth."

== Awards and honors ==
Giraffe Problems is a Junior Library Guild book, as well as a 2019 MRLS Cream of the Crop selection. In 2020, it was nominated for the Bill Martin, Jr. Picture Book Award.
