= Something's Wrong =

Something's Wrong may refer to:

- Something's Wrong (album), a compilation album by Violent Femmes
- Something's Wrong / Lost Forever, an album by Scott H. Biram
- "Something's Wrong", a song from James Marriott's album Don't Tell the Dog
- "Something's Wrong", a song from James Taylor's self-titled album
- "Something's Wrong", a song from Lost in Time (Eric Benét album)
- "Something's Wrong", a song from Tommy Stinson's album Village Gorilla Head
- "Something's Wrong", a song from The Jesus and Mary Chain's album Psychocandy
- "Something's Wrong", a song from Masta Ace's album Disposable Arts
- "Something's Wrong", a song from Pretty Lights's album Filling Up the City Skies
- "Something's Wrong", a song from Dillard Hartford Dillard's album Permanent Wave
- "Something's Wrong", a song from Dillard & Clark's The Fantastic Expedition of Dillard & Clark
- "Something's Wrong", a song from The Patridge Family's album The Partridge Family Notebook
- "Something's Wrong", a song from Siegel–Schwall Band's album Sleepy Hollow
- "Something's Wrong", a song from Sloan's album Never Hear the End of It
- "Something's Wrong", a song from Barbara Dickson's album Do Right Woman
- "Something's Wrong", a song from Swedish band Navigators's album Daily Life Illustrators
- "Something's Wrong", a song from Timothy B. Schmit's album Playin' It Cool
- "Something's Wrong", a song from the musical Marie Antoinette
- "Something's Wrong", a song from the musical comedy Men Shouldn't Sing
- "Something's Wrong", a song by Avengers; see Avengers (album)
- "Something's Wrong", a song by Fats Domino
- "Something's Wrong", a song by The Walls
- "Something's Wrong", a song by New World (band)
- "Something's Wrong", a song by Charlie Louvin
- "Something's Wrong", a song by K's Choice from album Paradise in Me
- "Something's Wrong (Change It)", a song from Casiopea's album Sun Sun
- Something's Wrong (children's book), 2021 book by Jory John

== See also ==
- Something Wrong (disambiguation)
