= Johnnie Turner =

Johnnie Turner may refer to:

- Johnnie Turner (Tennessee politician)
- Johnnie Turner (Kentucky politician)

== See also ==
- Johnny Ray Turner, Kentucky politician
- John Turner (disambiguation)
