= Charlie Thorpe =

Charlie Thorpe may refer to:

- Charlie Thorpe (character), a character in the soap opera Neighbours
- Charlie Thorpe (musician) (born 1990), Australian indie pop musician and songwriter
