= The Food Group =

Children's book series by Jory John

The Food Group is a children's book series by American author Jory John, illustrated by Pete Oswald and published by HarperCollins between 2017 and 2021. The series includes seven books: The Bad Seed (2017), The Good Egg (2019), The Cool Bean (2019), The Couch Potato (2020), The Good Egg Presents: The Great Eggscape! (2020), The Smart Cookie (2021), and The Bad Seed Presents: The Good, the Bad, and the Spooky (2021), The Sour Grape (2022), The Big Cheese (2023), and The Cool Bean Presents: As Cool as It Gets

All five released books have been on The New York Times Bestseller List for children's picture books. The Good Egg landed the number one spot.

== The Bad Seed ==
The Bad Seed, initially published on August 29, 2017, then republished May 8, 2018, is a children's book about self-acceptance.

The book was a New York Times bestseller for children's picture books and received a starred review from School Library Journal, as well as the following accolades:

- Junior Library Guild selection
- Washington Children’s Choice Picture Book Award Nominee (2019)
- North Carolina Children's Book Award Final Nominee (2019)
- Los Angeles Public Library Best of 2017: Children’s Books

== The Good Egg ==
The Good Egg, published on February 12, 2019, is a children's book about self-care.

The book landed the number one position on The New York Times bestseller list for children's pictures books. It received starred reviews from Kirkus Reviews and Booklist, as well as the following accolades:

- Junior Library Guild selection
- Goodreads Choice Award Nominee for Picture Books (2019)
- NPR's Book Concierge Selection (2019)
- Monarch Award Nominee (2021)

== The Cool Bean ==
The Cool Bean, published on December 3, 2019, is a children's book about self-esteem.

The book was a New York Times bestseller for children's picture books. It received a starred review from School Library Journal and was a Goodreads Choice Award Nominee for Picture Books in 2020.

== The Good Egg Presents ==
The Good Egg Presents: The Great Eggscape!, published on February 11, 2020, is a children's book about teamwork.

The book was a New York Times bestseller for children's picture books.

== The Couch Potato ==
The Couch Potato, published on November 3, 2020, is a children's book about self-management.

The book was a New York Times bestseller for children's picture books, and Indie Bestseller, and an Indie Next List Selection.

== The Bad Seed Presents ==
The Bad Seed Presents: The Good, the Bad, and the Spooky was published on July 27, 2021.

The book was a New York Times bestseller for children's picture books.

== The Smart Cookie ==
The Smart Cookie was published on November 2, 2021, is a children's book about Confidence.

== The Sour Grape ==
The Sour Grape was published on November 1, 2022, is a children's book about Forgiveness and Compassion.

== The Big Cheese ==
The Big Cheese is a children's book about Self-Awareness and Sportsmanship. It was published on November 7, 2023.
