= Cat Problems =

2021 children's book

- Author: Jory John
- Illustrator: Lane Smith
- Language: English
- Genre: Children's picture book
- Published: 2021 (Random House)
- Media type: Print (hardback)
- Pages: 48 (unpaginated)
- ISBN: 9780593302132

Cat Problems is a 2021 children's book written by Jory John and illustrated by Lane Smith. It is a comedic picture book about a pampered house cat. John and Smith also wrote Penguin Problems (2016) and Giraffe Problems (2018).

== Reception ==
Cat Problems was generally well received by critics, including a starred review from Booklist.

Multiple reviewers praised John's writing.

Kirkus Reviews wrote, "The cat's whiny, self-centered personality is wittily conveyed, but its wry monologue"–which Booklist's Lucinda Whitehurst "hilariously incessant"– "also elicits sympathy [...] Readers who’ve been owned by kitties will laugh knowingly at the protagonist’s shifty mental processes and comical shenanigans". Publishers Weekly noted that "the animal’s spewing seems so authentically feline that readers can’t help but laugh—and perhaps even identify with an id unabashedly unleashed". Deborah Stevenson, writing for The Bulletin of the Center for Children's Books, added, "John's text comically captures the catlike tendency to shift between languid and demanding, with a little destruction thrown in [...], and the snarky voice will be a dream to read aloud".

Reviewers also highlighted Smith's illustrations, which Kirkus called "frenetic". They further noted that "innovative book design enhances the visual appeal, with text placement and white space focusing attention. Numerous spreads are set in panels for quick pacing; many words/phrases are set in various fonts for dramatic effect", including "the frayed ends on some letters in the title on the dust jacket". Booklist's Whitehurst discussed how "Smith’s signature style captures the cat’s every emotion through its expressive eyes and tail and posture".

Whitehurst added, "A final touch of humor comes from the author and illustrator bios, written by William and Lulu, cats who live with John and Smith. Great fun, even—or especially?—if you don’t have a cat."

School Library Journal also reviewed the book.

== Honors ==
Cat Problems was an IndieBound national bestseller, as well as a 2021 IndieNext List Pick.
