= That's What Dinosaurs Do =

2019 children's book by Jory John

- First edition
- Author: Jory John
- Illustrators: Pete Oswald
- Language: English
- Genre: Picture book
- Publisher: HarperCollins
- Publication date: May 21, 2019
- Publication place: United States
- Media type: Print
- Pages: 32
- ISBN: 9780062343192

That's What Dinosaurs Do is a children's book written by Jory John, illustrated by Pete Oswald, and published May 21, 2019 by HarperCollins. The story is "about unapologetically and happily being yourself, no matter the cost."

== Reception ==
That's What Dinosaurs Do received a positive review from Booklist but mediocre reviews from Kirkus, Publishers Weekly, and School Library Journal.
