= All My Friends Are Dead (disambiguation) =

All My Friends Are Dead is a 2010 comedy book

All My Friends Are Dead may also refer to:

- AMFAD All My Friends Are Dead, a 2024 American horror film
- All My Friends Are Dead (2020 film), a Polish dark comedy film
- "All My Friends Are Dead", a song by Esham from the 1992 album Judgement Day
- "All My Friends Are Dead", a song by Hood from the 2003 album Compilations 1995–2002
- "All My Friends Are Dead", a song by Turbonegro from the 2005 album Party Animals
- "All My Friends Are Dead", a song by Sebastian Bach from the 2014 album Give 'Em Hell
- "All My Friends Are Dead", a song by Amity Affliction from the 2020 album Everyone Loves You... Once You Leave Them
