= Jonathan D. C. Turner =

Jonathan D C Turner
- Born: Jonathan David Chattyn Turner; 13 May 1958 (age 68); Stourbridge, England
- Education: Cambridge University; Université libre de Bruxelles; Queen Mary College, London
- Occupation: Barrister
- Years active: 1983–present

Jonathan David Chattyn Turner (born 13 May 1958) is an English barrister who specialises in intellectual property and competition law. A member of 13 Old Square Chambers in London, he is the author of a textbook on the application of European Union competition law to intellectual property, Intellectual Property and EU Competition Law (2010), which has received strong reviews describing it as " authoritative" and "very obviously the last word on the subject for the time being". Turner is also a director of the Authors' Licensing and Collecting Society and of the Copyright Licensing Agency.

== Biography ==
Turner was born on 13 May 1958 in Stourbridge, Worcestershire (now West Midlands), England. He was educated at Rugby School, Corpus Christi College, Cambridge (BA 1979, MA 1982), the Université libre de Bruxelles (Licence Spéciale en Droit Européen 1981) and Queen Mary College, London (1982). Called to the bar at Gray's Inn in 1982, he completed pupillage at the Chambers of Leonard Hoffmann QC, Robin Jacob QC and Alastair Wilson QC the following year, and thereafter practised as a barrister in London until 1995, when he joined Coopers & Lybrand as head of intellectual property (IP) and IT law. He returned to independent practice as a barrister in 1997 and remains active today.

Turner was appointed a panellist for determining domain name disputes by the World Intellectual Property Organization (WIPO) in 2000, and by the Czech Arbitration Court in 2006. He was elected a director of the Authors' Licensing and Collecting Society (ALCS) in 2010, and three years later appointed a director of the Copyright Licensing Agency (CLA). Turner's 2010 textbook on the application of European Union competition law to intellectual property, Intellectual Property and EU Competition Law, has been very positively reviewed in law journals. John Townsend, reviewing the book for the Modern Law Review, described it as "an authoritative study", "a substantial achievement" and "very obviously the last word on the subject for the time being".

== Cases ==
Cases in which Turner has acted include:

- Chelsea Man v Chelsea Girl [1987] RPC 189, [1988] FSR 217 (scope of injunction protecting goodwill in limited area; interpretation of injunction)
- Reckitt & Colman Products Ltd v Borden Inc [1990] 1 WLR 491, [1990] RPC 341 ("the Jif lemon case"—protection of visual branding)
- Potton Limited v Yorkclose Limited and Others [1990] FSR 11 (restitution of profits from copyright infringement)
- C & H Engineering v F Klucznik & Sons Ltd [1992] FSR 421 (scope of UK design right; concerned pig fenders)
- Lux Traffic Controls Limited v Pike Signals Limited [1993] RPC 107 (whether method of regulating road traffic excluded from patent protection, and whether prior use on country road was an enabling disclosure)
- Parmenter v Malt House Joinery [1993] FSR 680 (further prior art anticipating registered design found after trial)
- PLG Research v Ardon International [1995] RPC 287, [1995] FSR 116 (interpretation of patent claims)
- Designer Guild Limited v Russell Williams (Textiles) Limited [2000] 1 WLR 2416, [2001] FSR 11 (scope of copyright protection and the role of appellate courts)
- Antiquesportfolio.com v Rodney Fitch & Co. [2001] FSR 23, [2001] ECDR 5, [2001] EBLR 20 (existence and scope of copyright in photographs; set-off of cross-claims)
- Bim Kemi AB v Blackburn Chemicals Limited [2002] EWHC 25, [2001] 2 Lloyd's Rep 93, [2003] EWCA Civ 106, [2005] EuLR 176, [2005] UKCLR 1, acting for Blackburn Chemicals (set-off of cross-claims; formation, construction and repudiation of commercial contract; res judicata)
- Clearsprings Management Limited v Businesslinx Limited & Another [2005] EWHC 1487, [2006] FSR 3 (implied terms and ownership of copyright in commissioned software)
- Adobe Systems Incorporated v Netcom Online.co.uk [2012] EWHC 446, [2012] 2 CMLR 41, [2012] UKCLR 199, [2012] ECC 33, [2012] ETMR 39 (whether consent order could be challenged under EU competition or free trade law)

== Published works ==
Books

- Turner, Jonathan D C (2010). Intellectual Property and EU Competition Law. Oxford University Press. ISBN 9781904501459.

Co-author:

- Brook, Joanne; Turner, Jonathan D C (2002). Tolley's Domain Names: A Practical Guide. London: Tolley's. ISBN 9780754514916.

Contributor to:

- Hailsham, ed. (1985). Halsbury's Laws of England. Vol. 52. London: Butterworths.
- Vaughan, David, ed. (1986). Law of the European Communities. London: Butterworths.
- Vaughan, David, ed. (1990–2001). Law of the European Communities Service. London: Butterworths.
- Vaughan, David; Robertson, Aiden, eds. (2003). Law of the European Union. Oxford University Press.

Law reports

- Contributor to European Patent Office Reports since 1986; co-editor from 1986 to 1995
- Sullivan, Rory; Turner, Jonathan D C; Wilson, Alastair, eds. (1999). Marks & Clerk's European Patent Infringement Cases. London: Trenton Publishing.

Articles and papers

- Hillman, Jeffrey S; Turner, Jonathan D C (1977). "Association between Acute Glaucoma, the Weather and Sunspot Activity" (PDF). British Journal of Ophthalmology. 61 (61): 512–516. doi:10.1136/bjo.61.8.512. PMC 1043029. PMID 911731.
- Turner, Jonathan D C (1983). "Competition and the Common Market after Maize Seeds". European Law Review: 103–117. [1983] ELR 103.
- Turner, Jonathan D C (1983). "Chicago Pizzas – A Descriptive or Distinctive Name?". European Intellectual Property Review. [1983] EIPR 283.
- Turner, Jonathan D C (1984). "British Leyland v Armstrong: Euro-defences misunderstood". European Intellectual Property Review. [1984] EIPR 320.
- Turner, Jonathan D C (1984). "The need for an effective competition policy". European Intellectual Property Review. [1984] EIPR 331.
- Turner, Jonathan D C (1985). "The Prosecution of Karl Prantl: Bottles on the Incoming Tide". European Intellectual Property Review. [1985] EIPR 113.
- Turner, Jonathan D C (1985). "Copyrights and Competition in Ancillary Markets: Why the MMC is Wrong". European Intellectual Property Review. [1985] EIPR 325.
- Turner, Jonathan D C (1988). "Allen & Hanbury's v Generics: Acte clair – and wrong". European Intellectual Property Review. [1988] EIPR 186.
- Turner, Jonathan D C (1999). "The UK Competition Act 1998 and Private Rights". European Intellectual Property Review. [1999] ECLR 62, [1999] EIPR 181.
- Turner, Jonathan D C (1999). "Purposive Construction – Seven Reasons why Catnic is Wrong". European Intellectual Property Review. [1999] EIPR 531, [1999] CIPA 700.
- Turner, Jonathan D C (2000). "Plus Royaliste que le Roi – Glaxo v Dowelhurst". European Intellectual Property Review. [2000] EIPR 434, [2000] CIPA 330.
- Turner, Jonathan D C (September 2001). "When is inspiration lawful? – some observations following Designers Guild and the Turner Prize". Art Antiquity and Law. VI (3). 235.
