= Preshil School =

Independent school in Melbourne, Victoria, Australia

Location
- Kew, City of Boroondara, Melbourne, Victoria; Australia; 37°48′48″S 145°2′57″E

Information
- Other name: The Margaret Lyttle Memorial School
- Type: Independent progressive school
- Motto: Courage
- Established: 1931; 95 years ago
- Founder: Margaret J. R. Lyttle
- President: Emma Zipper
- Principal: Aaron Mackinnon
- Staff: ~52 (as of 2007)
- Years: Prep–Year 12
- Enrolment: ~350 (as of 2007)
- Campus type: Suburban
- Colours: Green and gold
- Slogan: Courage to Question
- Website: preshil.vic.edu.au

The Preshil School, officially known as the Margaret Lyttle Memorial School and often shortened as Preshil, is an independent progressive co-educational, day school located in Kew, an eastern suburb of Melbourne, Victoria, Australia. Established in 1931 by Margaret (Greta) J. R. Lyttle, the school caters for students from Prep through to Year 12. Preshil teaches a progressive curriculum, and is Australia's oldest progressive school.

The school has two campuses in Kew; the secondary school is located at 12–26 Sackville Street, at the Blackhall Kalimna campus; and the primary school is located at 395 Barkers Road, at the Arlington campus. Designed by Kevin Borland, a parent of the school, and built in stages between 1962 and 1975, the primary school campus was added to the Victorian Heritage Register on 13 October 2005 in recognition of its architectural, historic, and social significance; and was also added to a non-statutory list by the Victorian branch of the National Trust on 27 September 2004.

== History ==
Preshil was founded in 1931 by Margaret (Greta) J. R. Lyttle, in her home at 406 Barkers Road, Hawthorn. In 1937, growing numbers lead to the relocation of the primary school to its Arlington campus, further along Barkers Road. Greta and her niece Margaret (Mug) E. Lyttle continued to live at the school. Greta used the Hungarian psychoanalyst Clara Lazar Geroe as an advisor after she moved to Melbourne in 1941. Following Greta's death in 1944, Margaret (Mug) took over as principal.

Following the death of Sir Owen Dixon, in 1975, Preshil purchased his former Kew home, 'Yallambee'. The interior was gutted to construct classrooms. The school later sold the campus; and purchased the Blackhall site for its Senior School in 1978. During the 1980s, David Corke and students and teachers from Preshil identified a number of blazes marking Robert O'Hara Burke's camps from the Cooper Creek to the Diamantina River. Corke also replotted the site of William John Wills' death and an additional memorial cairn was erected by Joe Mack at the revised location.

In 2017, the school phased out the Victorian Certificate of Education (VCE) in favour of the International Baccalaureate (IB) programme. The school subsequently reintroduced the VCE, which it now offers alongside the IB. In 2022, Preshil paid $2.1 million to a victim of sexual abuse by a teacher who worked at the school in 1991. Declining enrolments and financial difficulties led the school to sell its Kalimna mansion campus to nearby Carey Baptist Grammar School in 2024. Carey rented the campus back to Preshil for 42 months.

=== Heritage-listed primary school campus ===
Preshil School Junior Campus
- Preshil School Arlington Campus
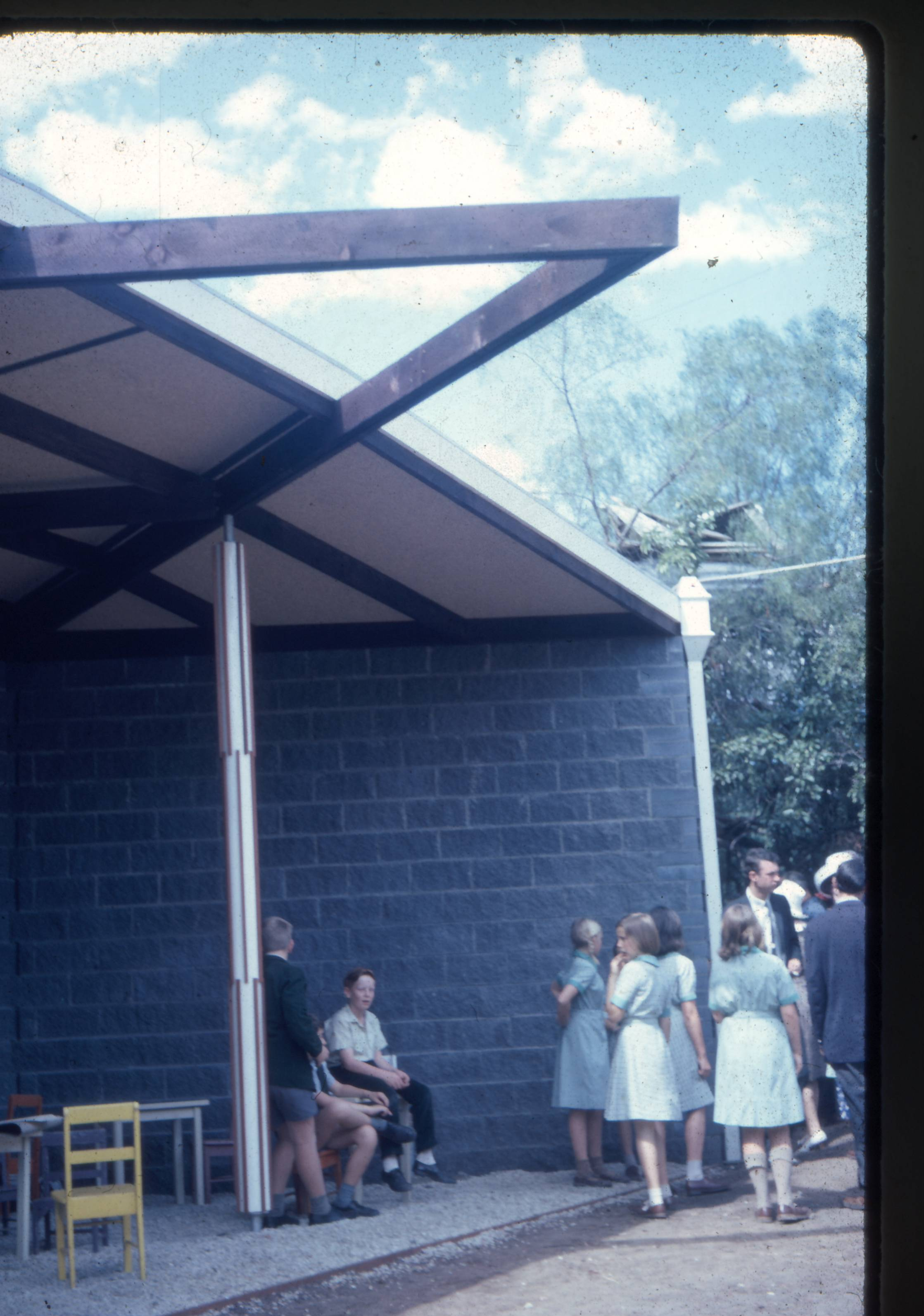
- Entrance to the hall, 1970s

- Location of the junior school in Greater Metropolitan Melbourne
- Interactive map of Preshil School Junior Campus
- 37°48′48″S 145°02′57″E
- Type: School buildings
- Location: 395 Barkers Road, Kew, Melbourne

History
- Built: 1962–1975

Site notes
- Architect(s): Kevin Borland & Associates
- Architectural style: Regional modernism

Victorian Heritage Register
- Official name: Preshill Junior School
- Type: Registered place
- Designated: 13 October 2005
- Reference no.: VHR H0072
- Heritage overlay no.: HO6
- Category: Education
- Building details
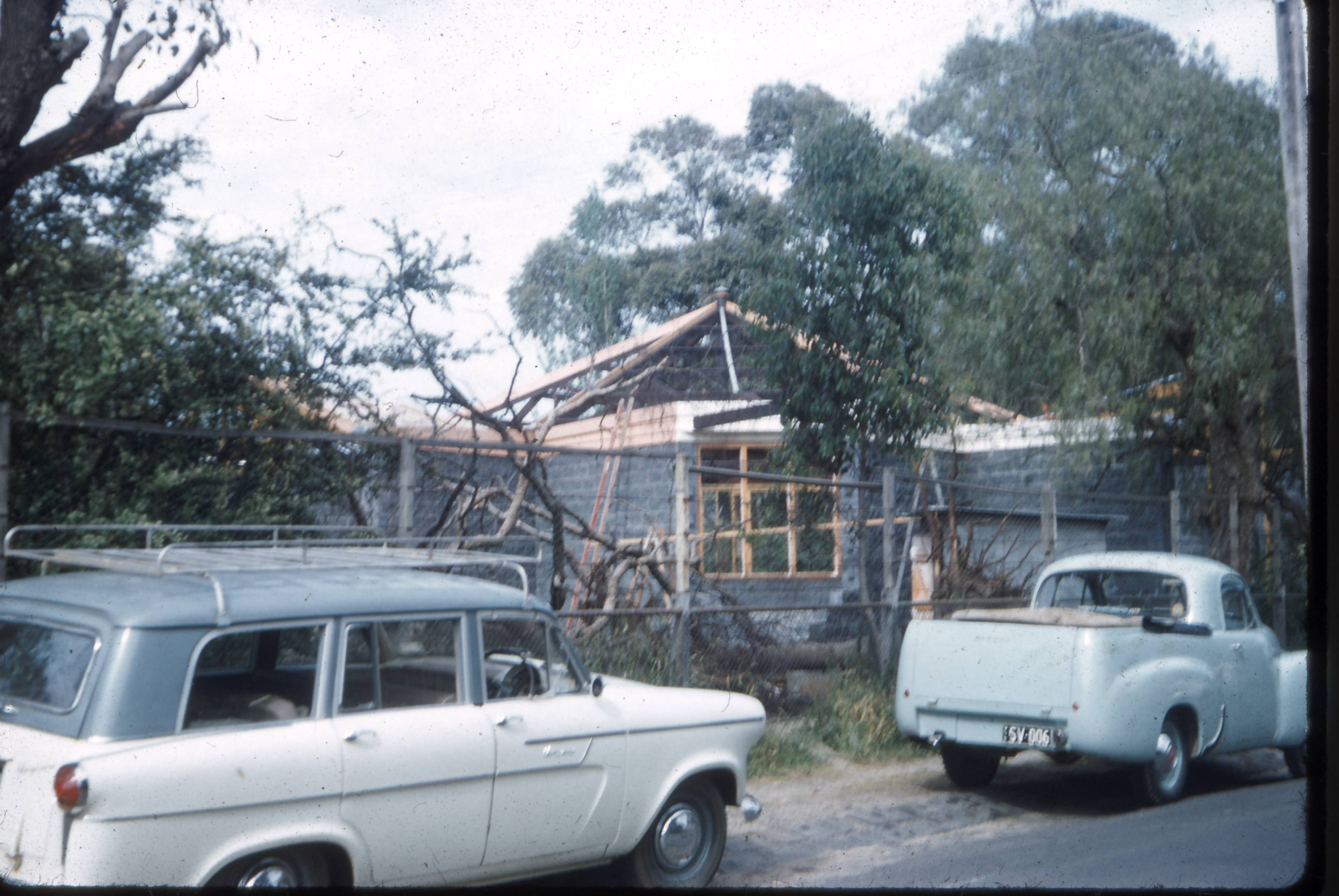
- Kevin Borland Hall under construction, 1960s

Design and construction
- Awards: Victorian Architecture Medal, 1972 (Bronze)

The buildings designed by Kevin Borland at Preshil were experimental in design and use triangular and hexagonal geometries together with diagonals in both plan and section. This created a variety of internal and external spaces, irregular forms and buildings that strongly deviates from the conventional school buildings of that time. The precise forme of each building and its detailing is counteracted by the use of raw timber posts and beams. The campus size is not much bigger than a large residential block in the area, which created a lively density of play spaces, trees and buildings. The buildings were laid out in a labyrinthine, non-hierarchical and non-institutional way, integrating the new buildings with the existing 1930s cottage and the landscape on the site. The buildings were designed to accommodate the school's approach to active learning, embodied in the child-scaled and multi-purpose buildings.

==== Kevin Borland Hall (1962) ====
The first building that Borland designed for the school was the 'Preshil school hall', later renamed to 'Kevin Borland Hall', constructed in 1962. It was designed for multi-purpose use and with its octagonal shape it was a clear departure from the usual nave-like school halls. It is most famous for its intricate octagonal timber roof structure with skylights. It has wooden beams that span both the hall and the sheltered bays outside of it. The roof is clad in steel deck, and the walls are built of grey concrete blocks. In 1959 Borland and Geoff Trewenack designed glazed pyramidal skylights in the McCarthy-house that acted as a precedent of the roof structure at the Preshil school hall.

==== House, prep room and library (1930s, 1964, 1975) ====
In 1994 Borland designed classrooms for pre-school children in an addition to the east end of the original house (the 1930s), incorporating what once was a bedroom and sitting room of the house. Borland wanted to design an informal building that referred to the kid's scale with a combination of small and large spaces. Large, open classrooms with mezzanine floors that can be reached with ladders, provide the kids with an opportunity to isolate themselves from the group when they want to. The addition is a rectangular timber building with an elevated verandah along its length. In 1975 a second addition to the original house was made by Borland and his associate, Jenny Shannon. This time it was a second-floor addition to the rear of the original house. It is an irregular form built with brick, raw timber and glass with multiple levels. It was supposed to be a staff room, but quickly turned into the school library, with a good view of the site.

==== Tree house (1965) ====
The 'Treehouse', built in 1965, consists of two elevated rectangular timber classrooms, with long window-shades by timber slats and timber bays along one side of the building. The two rooms are separated by a timber deck, through which an Italian Cyprus grows, giving the building its name. Underneath the deck is a space used for woodwork classes and sandpits.

==== Multi-purpose tutorial rooms (1939, 1969) ====
The original rectangular classroom, built 1939, was modified by Borland together with Philip Cohen as assistant architect in 1969. The intent was to create multi-purpose 'tutorial' classrooms that provides private and community spaces. This is achieved by large classrooms that can be divided with folding doors. The building is long, rectangular and with an open verandah along the north side.

==== Home-rooms (1972) ====
In 1972, Borland and assistant architect John Kenny built the irregularly planned timber building called the 'home rooms'. It has a variety of spaces on different levels that are linked by steps, and a mezzanine level for the children to find private places in that can be reached by ladder. To provide spaces for individual activities, the west wall zig-zags. Borland stated in 1974: "Observing the fact that all kids love to climb and be on different levels, I designed a building that would reflect this by use of levels, and low spaces for example. They like the comfortable feeling of the low scale – it’s almost the womb-like syndrome".

== ERA Secondary School ==
ERA Secondary School in Donvale was founded by Preshil parents who wanted a secondary school to complete education after Preshil. Although Preshil later withdrew support in 1970 the school opened in 1971 at 'The White House' in Warrandyte in a temporary premises and later that year in Donvale. The school closed in 1987 due to financial struggles.

== Principals ==
The following individuals have served as principals of the school:

Ordinal	Name	Start date	End date	Time in office	Notes
1	Margaret (Greta) J. R. Lyttle	1931	1944	12–13 years	
2	Margaret (Mug) E. Lyttle	1944	1994	49–50 years	
		1994	1997	2–3 years	
3	Dermot Lyttle	1997	2004	6–7 years	
4	Frank Moore	2004	2010	5–6 years	
5	Marilyn Smith	2010	2020	9–10 years	
−	Natalie Jensen (interim)	2020	2021	0–1 years	
−	Cressida Batterham-Wilson (interim)	2021	2022	0–1 years	
6	Josh Brody	2022	2024	1–2 years	
7	Aaron Mackinnon	2024	incumbent	1–2 years	

== Notable alumni ==
- Polly Borland – artist
- Clare Bowditch – musician
- Lauren Burns – gold medallist in taekwondo at the Sydney 2000 Olympic Games
- Zahava Elenberg – architect
- Nicolette Fraillon – chief conductor of The Australian Ballet orchestra
- Zana Fraillon – author
- Todd Goldstein – Australian rules footballer playing for the North Melbourne Football Club
- Lisa Gorton – novelist, poet, granddaughter of Prime Minister John Gorton
- Greg Hjorth – Australian Professor of Mathematics, chess International Master (1984) and Commonwealth Champion in 1983
- Stephen Housden – musician, lead guitarist for Little River Band
- Kaiya Jones – actor on Neighbours
- Catherine Anne Money (née Menzies) – scientist at CSIRO (attended primary School)
- Toby Martin – singer–songwriter
- Brendan Murphy – former Chief Medical Officer of Australia and Secretary of the Department of Health
- Rachel Nordlinger – linguist
- Sue Richardson – economist and academic
- Gina Riley – actor known for playing Kim Craig on Kath and Kim
- Jane Routley – fantasy author
- Peter Singer – philosopher
- Charlie Thorpe – singer in Dash and Will
- Stephen Wilkins – physicist, phase-contrast X-ray imaging (PCXI)

== Gallery ==
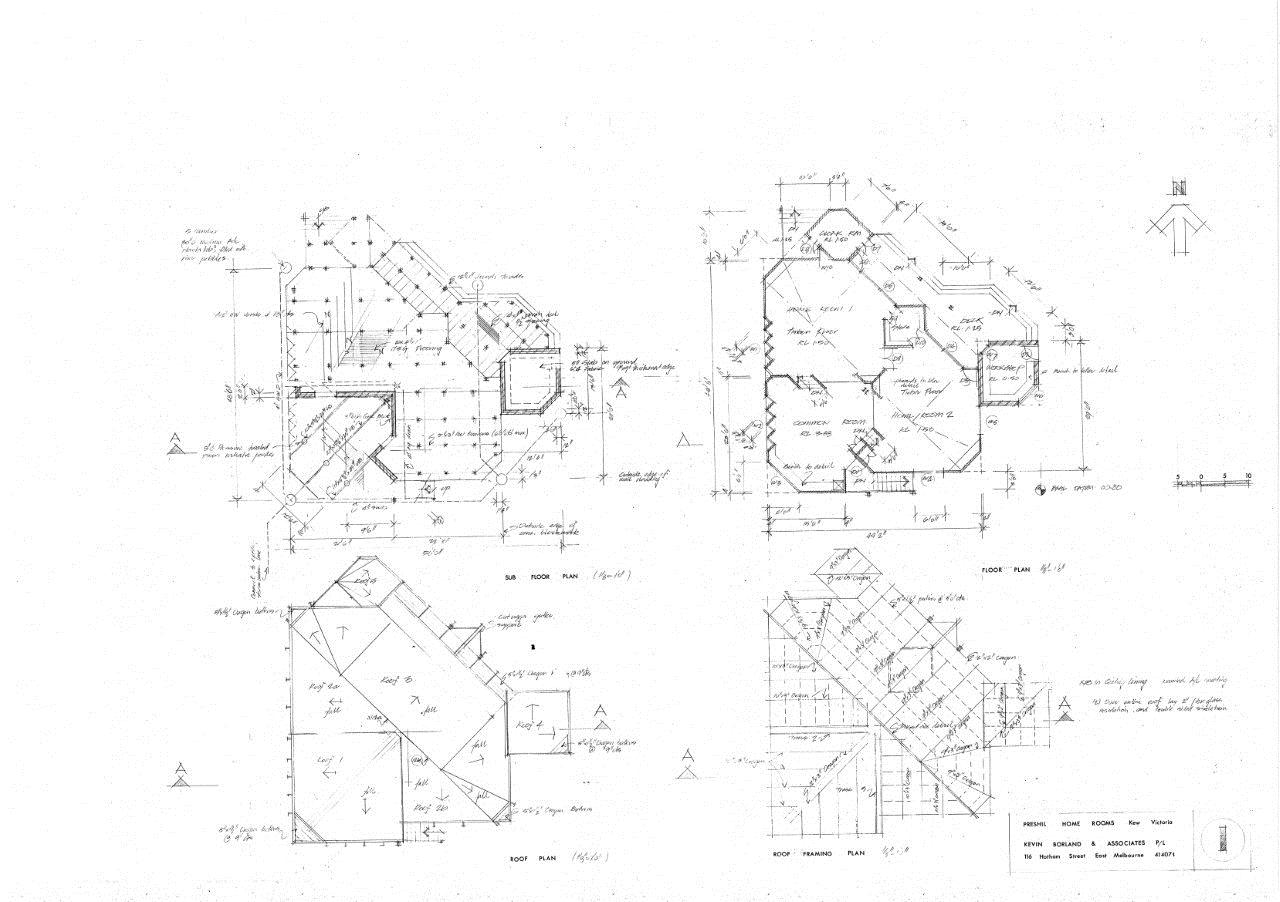
Home rooms plan

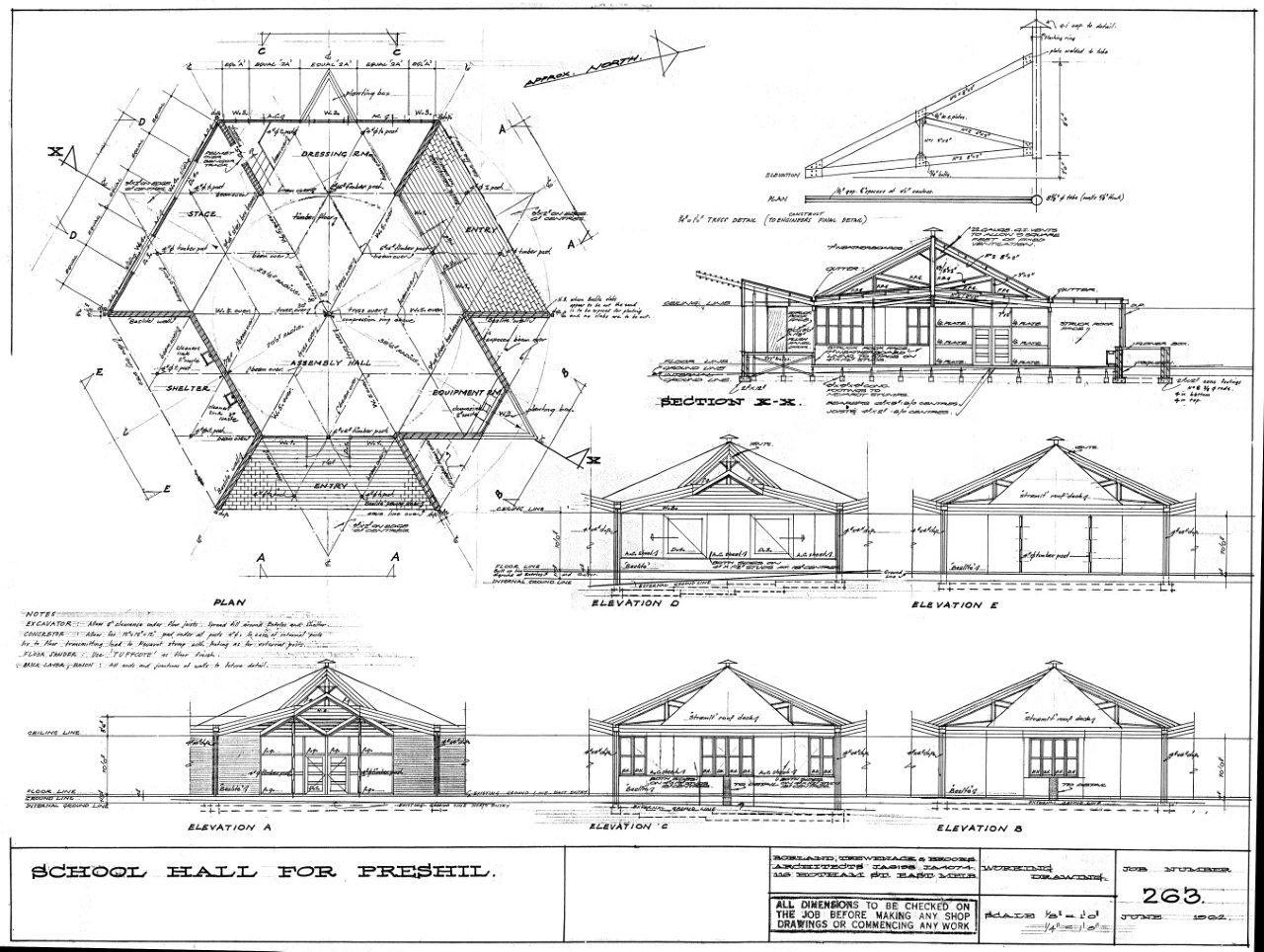
Hall four

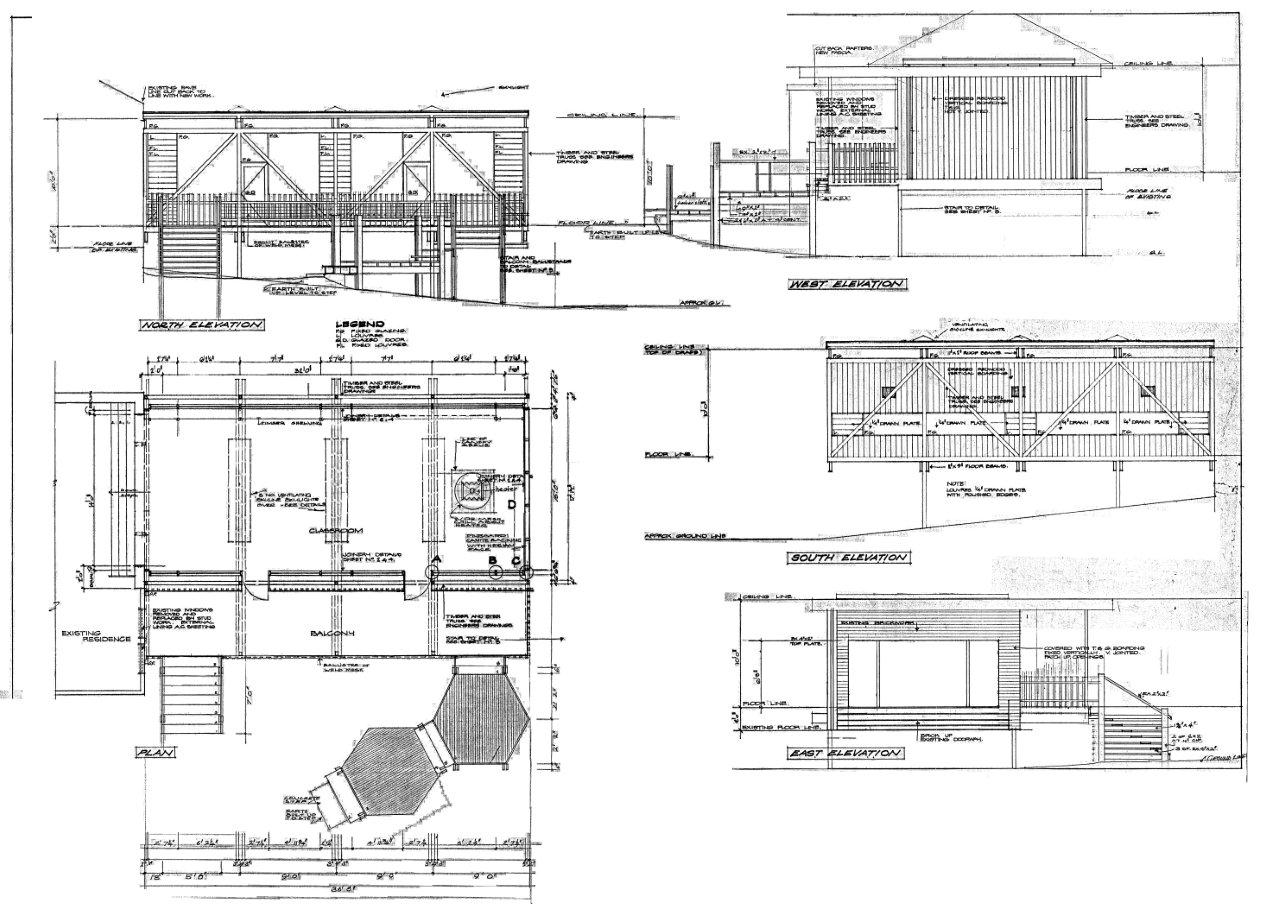
Plan

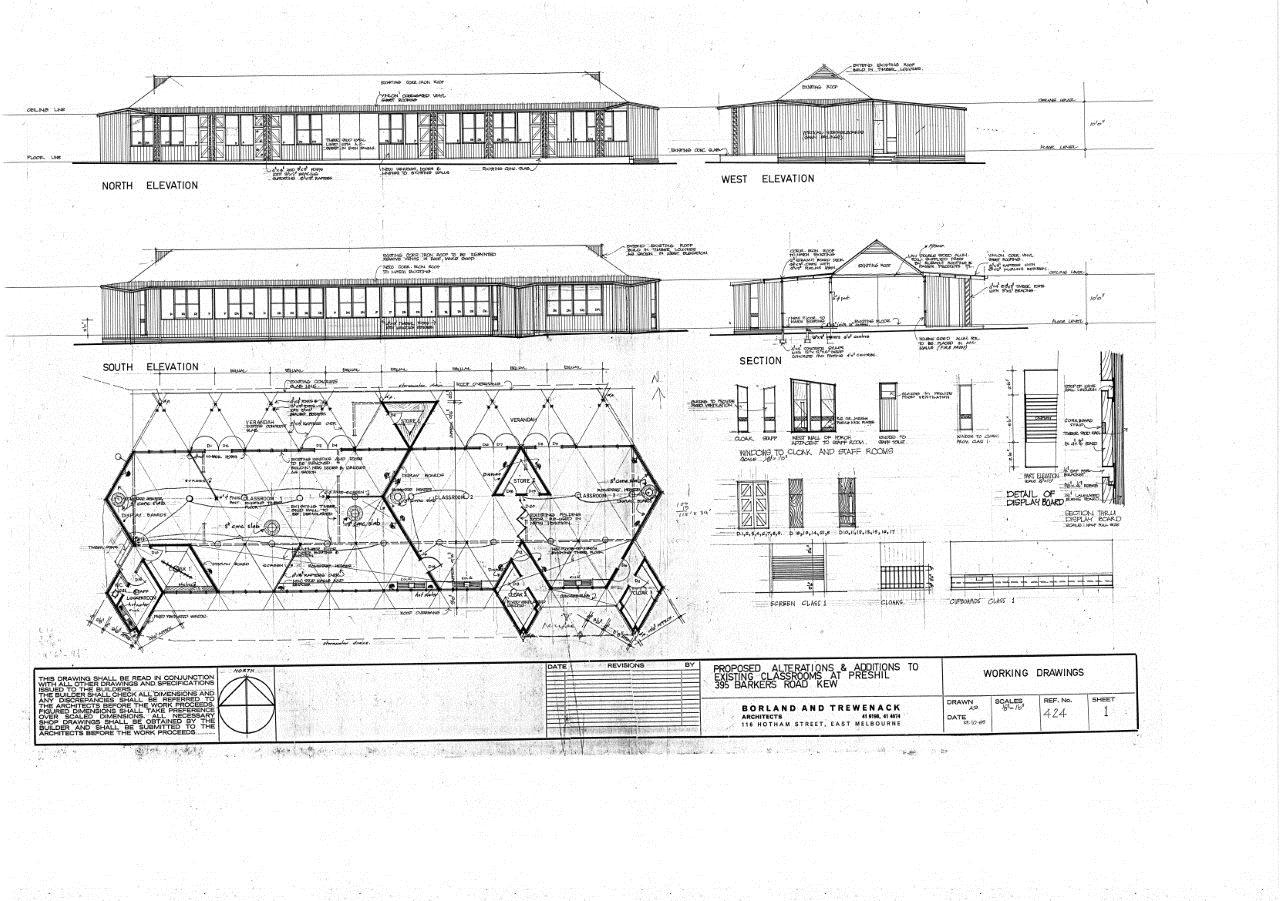
Classroom

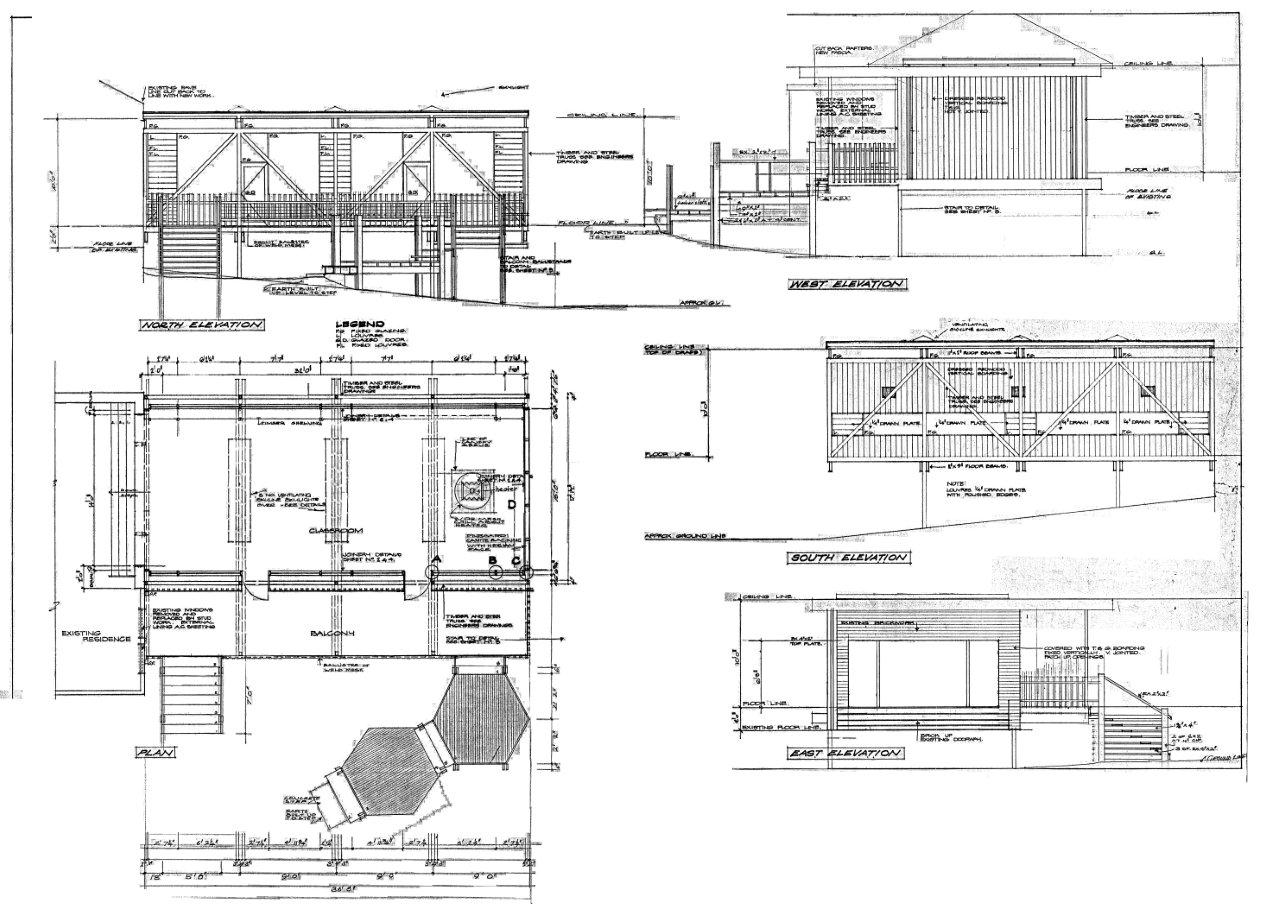
Plan

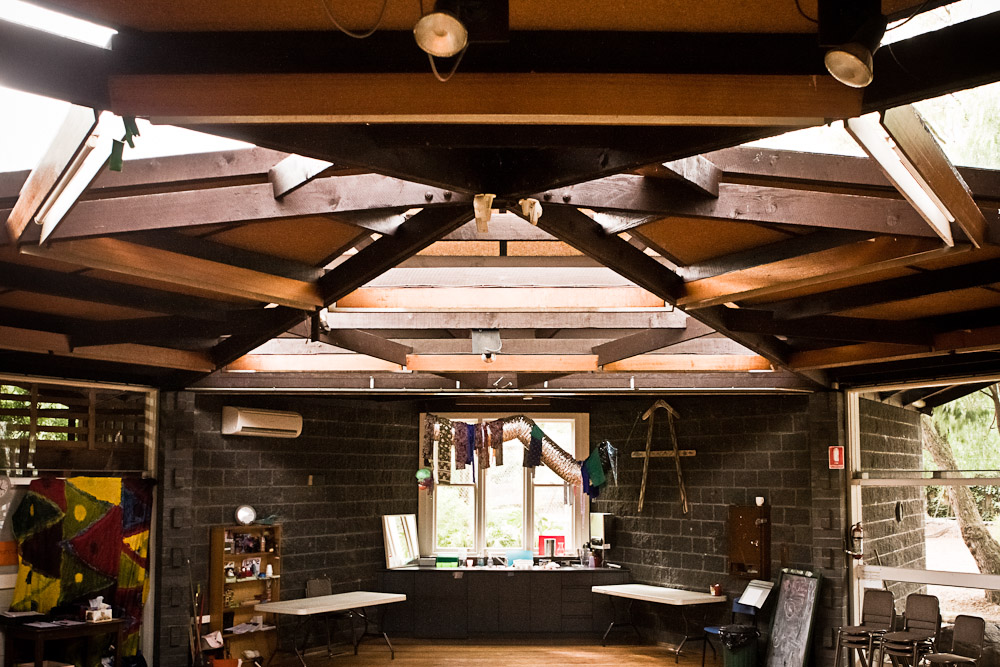
Hall

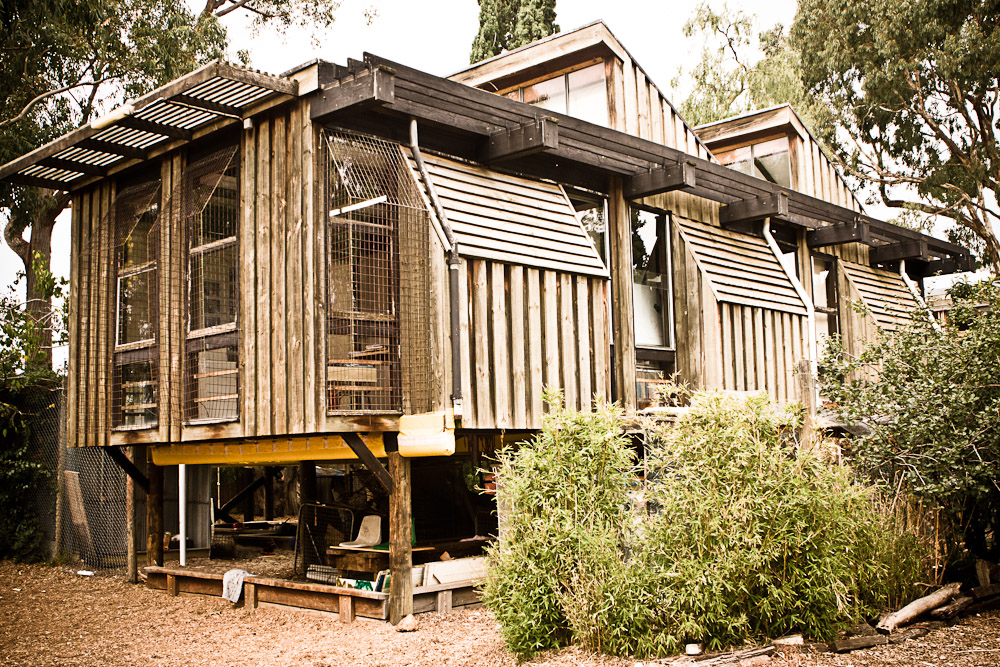
Tutorial rooms

== See also ==
- List of schools in Victoria, Australia
- List of places on the Victorian Heritage Register in the City of Boroondara
- Architecture of Melbourne
