= Attack of the Underwear Dragon =

Attack of the Underwear Dragon is a children's picture book written by Scott Rothman and drawn by Pete Oswald, published in 2020 by Random House.

The plot involves a boy named Cole who tries to become a helper to a knight named Sir Percival. As Cole progresses on his journey, his community is attacked by a dragon who wears underwear, and the boy seeks to stop the dragon.

Some artwork takes up two pages at once. Publishers Weekly stated that the plot's progression is akin to that of "a well-oiled cartoon episode". Kirkus Reviews stated that the artwork provides humor via characters' faces and is "frenetic". Julia Smith of Booklist described the art as "cartoonish"; she wrote that the non sequiturs provide humor. Reviewer Natalie Berglind stated that the artwork palette is either characterized by "saturated hues" or "muted" depending on the stage of the story, and that the artwork is "detailed and playful".

The sequel, Return of the Underwear Dragon, written and drawn by the same people, was published in 2021 by Random House. It involves Cole trying to teach the dragon how to read. A girl named Claire assists Cole when the dragon goes rogue after finding frustration in the learning process.

John Peters in Booklist wrote that, in regards to the sequel, "The plot makes absolutely no sense" but that readers will find the book entertaining anyway. Kirkus Reviews refers to the artwork in this book as "stylized".
