= Edge of the Deep =

Edge of The Deep
- Directed by: Peter Bruce, David Corke
- Written by: David Corke
- Narrated by: Ian Neil
- Cinematography: David Corke
- Release date: 1959
- Running time: 22 min
- Country: Australia
- Language: English

Edge of The Deep is a 1959 Australian documentary focusing on bird life around the sea shore. It screened at the Melbourne Film Festival in 1959. The film won the 1959 Australian Film Institute award for Best Documentary.
