= Publishers' Licensing Services =

Publishers' Licensing Services (PLS), formerly The Publishers Licensing Society, is a not-for-profit organisation that represents many book, magazine and journal publishers based in the United Kingdom. PLS works to ensure that publishers are fairly compensated for any copying of their works through the collective licensing scheme, among other rights management services, which have become an increasing important secondary revenue stream for publishers. Its primary goal is to oversee collective licensing in the UK for book, journal, magazine and website copying. The society was established in 1981. Together with the Authors' Licensing and Collecting Society, PLS own and direct the Copyright Licensing Agency. They also work in partnership with NLA media access.

PLS distributed over £34m to publishers from collective licensing in 2017–18, and they work to encourage innovation and good practice in rights management, whether that is in print or online.

Services PLS also provide a range of rights management services and initiatives.

== What is Collective Licensing? ==
Collective Licensing offers a simple and cost effective solution both for those who wish to copy from published materials without breaking the law, and for rights holders where direct licensing would be inefficient and unduly burdensome.

A blanket license allows users to copy from a broad range of repertoire in return for a license fee. The license fee is paid to the rights holders whose publications have been shown to have been copied.

== Governance and authority ==
PLS is a not-for-profit company limited by guarantee. It is owned and controlled by the four trade associations representing publishers' interests: the Association of Learned and Professional Society Publishers (ALPSP); the Independent Publishers Guild (IPG); the Professional Publishers Association (PPA); the Publishers' Association (PA).

Up to three directors are nominated by each of the trade association members of PLS (the Association of Learned and Professional Publishers, the Professional Publishers Association, the Independent Publishers Guild and the Publishers Association) and are approved by the Board. The Chairman is appointed by the Board and is independent of the members. The Chief Executive is appointed by the Board.

== History and collective licensing ==
With the introduction of the dry photocopier in the early 1970s, the situation on control of copyright in the UK's main institutions ran out of control. Machines appeared everywhere and infringements proliferated.

A committee was formed, chaired by Mr Justice Whitford, on Copyright and Design Law and asked to investigate the situation. It reported early in 1977 and recommended collective copyright licensing as the solution. It also recommended the abolition of the fair dealing and library privilege exceptions. This was desired by publishers but never achieved. Political pressure from information-users was always too great.

Later that year, the Publishers' Association (PA) convened a Committee chaired by Lord Wolfenden, formerly Vice Chancellor of Reading University and Director of the British Museum, to look at the implementation of the Whitford proposals on licensing. Represented on the Committee where the PA, the PPA, ALPSP, the Music Publishers Association, the Society of Authors, the Writers Guild and the Composer Guild. The newspaper associations were invited to join but declined to participate.

Publishers were initially unresponsive to the concept of collective licensing, particularly on a blanket basis. And at an early stage, the Music Publishers Association and the Composers Guild withdrew from the Wolfenden Committee. They conducted two successful and much publicised actions against infringement by photocopying at a public school. This encouraged them to think that the best solution was to issue a Code of Practice backed by legal action rather than licensing. Printed music was excluded from the collective licence. To this day music publishers have never returned.

The Wolfenden Committee made licensing of schools its first objective. The Scottish local authorities always recognised the necessity of licensing. In England and Wales, however, long arguments persisted that all their multiple copying was legal because it did not represent substantial parts of works. The only course of action was to resort to law. A case came to hand over the copying of technical drawings in Manchester local authority. The local authorities backed down and agreed to negotiate a licence. So did the universities, where solicitors’ letters had been issued over similar infringements.

Lord Wolfenden bowed out of the scene and leading copyright lawyer Denis de Freitas was asked to work on the structure of the licensing agency. Publishers wanted there to be an agency, but authors insisted a forceful language from the President, Lord Willis, that all their payments must go through ALCS. It was therefore necessary to form the Publishers Licensing Society, established in 1981, to manage publishers’ rights and pay publishers accordingly.

Setting up a licensing structure on the publishing side had been met by loans from the PA and PPA. When the Copyright Licensing Agency was formed, PLS passed all administration of collective licensing to the new body. Colin Hadley was appointed as the Manager of CLA. PLS was deliberately run as a low key operation in contrast to ALCS. Eventually the profile of PLS was raised by expanding the management team.

The Copyright, Designs and Patents Act 1988 was a landmark and demonstrated the wisdom of having put the societies and licensing agency in place. The whole principle of licensing was endorsed and written into legislation via Chapter VII of the 1988 Act.

In April 2008 collective licensing completed a full circle with the launch of the first licenses in UK to cover the copying, or re-use, of digital material – the first of their kind to be developed in Europe.

Despite some operational tensions over rights and licensing proposals between PLS and CLA over the years, the creation of the two organisations has been a great success and now raises many millions of pounds each year for publishers. Important to the success of PLS have been the avoidance by the principles (ALPSP, PA, & PPA) of any attempt to undermine each other's position and their willingness to consult with publishers to ensure that the various proposals were acceptable.

In September 2015, The Independent Publishers Guild (IPG) was accepted membership of the Publishers Licensing Society (PLS) — the first new member to join the society in more than three decades. The IPG is the first new member of PLS since it was established in 1981, and joins existing trade association members the Association of Learned and Professional Society Publishers (ALPSP); the Publishers Association (PA); and the Professional Publishers Association (PPA).
