= David Corke =

Australian documentary film maker, naturalist and educational author

David G. Corke
- Born: 13 February 1930 (age 96); Straits Settlements
- Employer(s): University of Melbourne; CSIRO; Educational Media Australia
- Known for: Documentary films, wildlife films, educational resources
- Children: Fiona Corke, Peter Corke, Richard Corke
- Awards: Australian Film Institute awards, ANZAAS Orbit Award, Creative Excellence Awards US

David Corke (born 13 February 1930) is an Australian documentary film maker, naturalist and educational author. He filmed first-encounter between Europeans and the aboriginal Pintupi people, and was the first person to film the birth of a red kangaroo.

== Career ==
Corke began making wildlife and natural history films in 1952, alongside colleagues Peter Bruce, Graham Pizzey and Gil Brealey. Films included Raak about Wedge-tailed eagles, Edge of The Deep about the pattern life along the tidelines; Baama about bird life along the edge of the Murray River; and Sunset Country.

From 1959 to 1970 he worked for the Commonwealth Scientific and Industrial Research Organisation Film Unit, making a range of scientific films that were widely distributed as 16mm film prints to community groups, clubs and schools.

In 1963, Corke was seconded to the University of Melbourne as director/cameraman for an expedition led by Dr. Donald Thomson into the Great Sandy Desert to study the Pintupi people living a traditional lifestyle in the area around Lake Mackay. A documentary, People out of time, resulted from the expedition.

In the 1970s Corke made films and other AV resources for Educational Media Australia to support the "Web of Life" national biology program for schools – an initiative of John Stewart Turner and the Australian Academy of Science.

Corke has also made several freelance natural history films (including the AFI Jedda award-winning film Late in a Wilderness, Shed Tears for the River, and Eudyptula minor!) and written several series of books for school history and social studies programs. He has also written about the Burke and Wills expedition including books and journal articles and was the founding president of the Burke and Wills historical society.

== Filmography ==
- Raak (1956) about Wedge-tailed eagles
- Edge of The Deep (1959) about the pattern life along the tidelines, winner of Australian Film Award
- Baama (1962) about bird life along the edge of the Murray River
- Sunset Country (1963)
- Bird banding in Australia (1964)
- The computer CSIRAC (1965)
- Window into space (1965) about the Parkes radio-telescope
- Birth of the red kangaroo (1965) about reproduction of the Red kangaroo
- A skeleton in the crop (1969) about the introduced invasive skeleton weed
- In Central Australia with Crosbie Morrison (1970)
- Flight Line One: Controlled Burning from Aircraft(1971) about controlled burning for bushfire prevention
- Eudyptula minor! (1971) about Fairy Penguins.
- Late in a Wilderness (1972) about wildlife at a waterhole near Broken Hill, AFI Jedda award-winning film
- The Waterhole (1973) an edited, educational version of the film Late in a Wilderness;
- Shed Tears for the River (1973) about "the degradation and destruction of the natural environment of the Murray river system in South Australia by human activities"
- The Wetlands Problem (1979)
- Animals of Australia (1979)
- Desert Hopping Mouse (1982) about the spinifex hopping-mouse (Notomys alexis) of inland Australia;
- Egg-laying Mammals (1984) about Australian monotremes
- Yirritidja (1986) based on footage taken on the Bindibu expedition.

== Memberships ==
- Founding president (2005-8) of the Burke and Wills historical society.
- Accredited member of the Australian Cinematographers Society.
- Member (and assistant secretary in 1948/1949) of the Royal Australasian Ornithologists Union (now BirdLife Australia).
