= Dash and Will =

Musical duo

Dash & Will
- Origin: Melbourne, Australia
- Genres: Indie pop Pop rock
- Years active: 2005–2011
- Label: Gigantically Small/Mercury Records
- Members: Charlie Thorpe (Dash); Josie De Sousa-Reay (Will)
- Website: Dashandwill.com.au

Dash & Will are an Australian indie pop/pop rock duo formed in 2005, from Melbourne.

== Career history ==
Dash (Charlotte "Charlie" Thorpe) and Will (Josie De Sousa-Reay) first met in early 1999, at age nine. The pair both started grade four on the same day at the same new school, Preshil: The Margaret Lyttle Memorial School. Their original relationship was bitter, as Josie recalls the two had "hated each other for quite a few years". At age twelve, they began performing together and in year nine (age fourteen), Charlie and Josie were awarded a small financial grant to record a professional demo of their original songs.

The following year, in 2005, Josie's dad was talking to the father of one of the girl's classmates, Barry Palmer a Melbourne-based producer and former guitarist with Hunters & Collectors and Deadstar. Not long after, Palmer contacted the girls and asked if they would come into the studio for a chat and live performance. He then signed the duo to his music production company, Gigantically Small, and they would eventually sign to Mercury Records through Universal Music Australia.

Dash and Will headlined the 2008 Rock the Schools tour across New South Wales in May, as well as supporting Ben Lee, Matt Costa and Faker's Nathan Hudson. Their first single, "Pick You Up", was released in May 2008, and second single "Fighting Over Nothing" was released in October 2008.

Dash and Will supported British indie rockers The Kooks on their Australian tour in August and September 2008 as well as The Futureheads, End of Fashion and Van She. They were also on the bill to play the long-running summer festivals Homebake and Falls Festival, also playing on The Other Stage at Southbound in 2009.

In September 2008, the duo's version of The Easybeats' "Somethin' Wrong" was released on Easy Fever, a compilation of The Easybeats' classic songs performed by Australian and New Zealand artists.

Dash & Will once again supported The Kooks on their second tour of Australia in January 2009, as well as supporting another UK band The Ting Tings. The duo found exposure through appearances on numerous Australian television programs, including children show Saturday Disney and music quiz shows RocKwiz and 'Spicks and Specks'. They also hosted four episodes of a music based show for kids, The Go Show, on the Foxtel channel Nickelodeon.

They released their debut studio album, Up in Something, in August 2009.

In May 2011, Dash and Will also supported Justin Bieber on his 'My World' tour in Australia.

== Discography ==
=== Studio albums ===
List of albums, with Australian chart positions
Title	Album details	Peak chart positions
Title	Album details	AUS Hit.
Up in Something	Released: August 2009; Label: Mercury (2714887); Format: CD	4

=== Extended plays ===
List of EPs, with Australian chart positions
Title	Album details	Peak chart positions	
Title	Album details	AUS Hit.	AUS Phy.
Pick You Up	Released: 2008; Label: Gigantically Small (1774087); Format: CD	—	—
Fighting Over Nothing	Released: 2008; Label: Gigantically Small (1786403); Format: CD	19	47

=== Charted singles ===
List of singles, with selected chart positions
Title	Year	Peak chart positions	Album
Title	Year	AUS Phy.	Album
"Out of Control"	2009	42	Up in Something
