= Goodnight Already! =

Children's book series by Jory John

Goodnight Already! is a children's book series by American author Jory John, illustrated by Benji Davies and published by HarperCollins. The series includes four books: Goodnight Already! (2014), I Love You Already! (2015), Come Home Already! (2017), and All Right Already! (2018).

== Goodnight Already! ==
Goodnight Already! was published December 2, 2014.

The book received positive reviews from Booklist and Publishers Weekly, as well as a mediocre review from Kirkus Reviews. It also received the following accolades:

- Goodreads Choice Award Nominee for Picture Books (2015)
- E. B. White Read-Aloud Honor Book (2015)

== I Love You Already! ==
I Love You Already! was published December 22, 2015.

The book received positive reviews from Publishers Weekly and Booklist, as well as a mediocre review from Kirkus Reviews.

== Come Home Already! ==
Come Home Already! was published December 5, 2017.

The book received a positive review from Kirkus Reviews and was named one of Bank Street College of Education's Best Children's Books of the Year (2018).

== All Right Already! ==
All Right Already! was published November 13, 2018.

The book received a positive review from School Library Journal.
