= Independent Publishers Guild =

Association supporting independent publishing firms in the United Kingdom

The Independent Publishers Guild (IPG) is an association set up to support independent publishers in the UK and Ireland. It has more than 600 members sharing annual turnover of more than £1bn. The IPG is a not-for-profit limited company and has a non-executive board of directors. The chief executive is Bridget Shine.

== History ==
Founded in 1962, the organisation was originally known as the Independent Publishers Group until in 1966/67, it became the Independent Publishers Guild.

The IPG's activities include conferences, the annual IPG Awards, which recognise the achievements of individuals and companies within the UK industry, and collective stands at the London Book Fair and the Frankfurt Book Fair.

In 2015, the IPG became a member of the Publishers Licensing Society, now known as Publishers' Licensing Services (PLS), an organisation owned and managed by the four main trade associations, the others being the Publishers' Association (PA), the Professional Publishers Association (PPA), and the Association of Learned and Professional Society Publishers (ALPSP).
