= It's Not My Fault! =

2020 children's book by Jory John

- Author: Jory John
- Illustrators: Jared Chapman
- Language: English
- Genre: Children's literature, Picture book
- Publisher: Random House Books for Young Readers
- Publication date: June 9, 2020
- Publication place: United States
- Media type: Print
- ISBN: 978-1-98-483061-6
- OCLC: 1110123224

It's Not My Fault! is a children's book about emotional literacy written by Jory John, illustrated by Jared Chapman, and published June 9, 2020 by Random House Books for Young Readers.

== Reception ==
It's Not My Fault! received positive reviews from Booklist, Publishers Weekly, The Bulletin, and School Library Journal. Kirkus gave it a mediocre review, stating it was "an ineffective mixture of moralistic and didactic."
