= Todd Goldstein =

Australian rules footballer (born 1988)

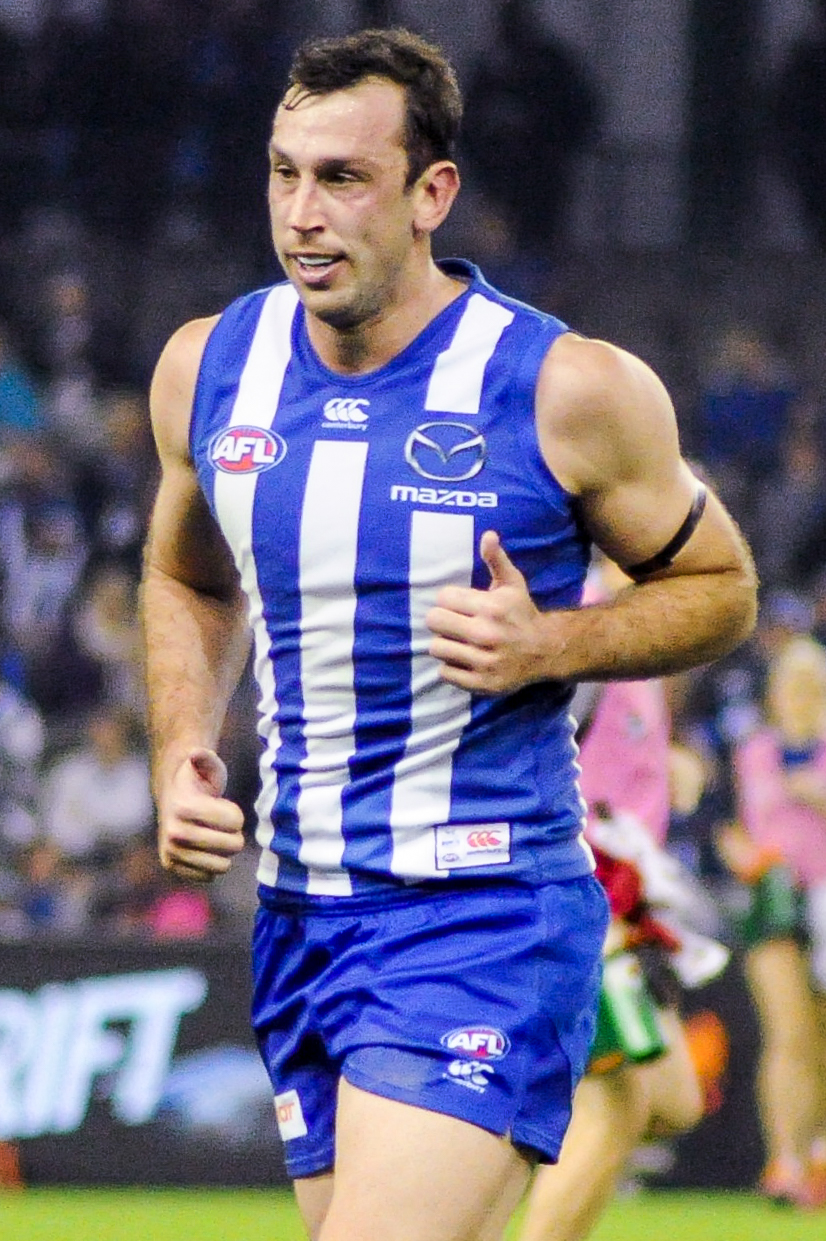
- Goldstein playing for North Melbourne in 2017

Personal information
- Full name: Todd Goldstein
- Nicknames: Goldy, Bobcat, Old Gold
- Born: 1 July 1988 (age 38)
- Original team: Oakleigh Chargers (TAC Cup)/Trinity Grammar(AGSV)
- Draft: No. 37, 2006 National Draft, Kangaroos
- Height: 201 cm (6 ft 7 in)
- Weight: 103 kg (227 lb)
- Position: Ruckman

Playing career
Years	Club	Games (Goals)
2007–2023	North Melbourne	315 (157)
2024–2025	Essendon	30 (3)
Total		345 (160)

Representative team honours
Years	Team	Games (Goals)
2020	Victoria	1 (0)

Career highlights
- Syd Barker Medal: (2015); All-Australian: (2015); Most hitouts in VFL/AFL history

Todd Goldstein (born 1 July 1988) is a former Australian rules footballer who played for North Melbourne and Essendon in the Australian Football League (AFL). He was drafted by North Melbourne from the Oakleigh Chargers with the 37th selection in the 2006 AFL draft. In 2015 he became the first-ever player to reach 1000 hitouts in a season. He surpassed Aaron Sandilands for the most hitouts in VFL/AFL history in Round 17, 2021.

== Early playing career ==
Goldstein stands at 201 cm and has a basketball background, representing Australia at Under-19 level. He was a member of the Oakleigh Chargers 2006 side which won the TAC Cup.

Goldstein kicked a goal with his first kick for Victorian Football League side the Tasmanian Devils Football Club in 2007.

Goldstein played his junior basketball at Balwyn Blazers and Nunawading Spectres. At one stage he harboured ambitions to play college basketball in America. He focussed on football in 2006, playing for his school team and Oakleigh Chargers, he nominated for the AFL draft in that same year. He was eventually drafted by North Melbourne at pick 37 in the 2006 AFL draft.

== AFL career ==
=== North Melbourne ===
Goldstein was selected to debut for North Melbourne in their Round 15 clash with the Port Adelaide Power at AAMI Stadium in 2008. On debut, he collected four disposals and won 13 hitouts. In the next round, Goldstein kicked two goals against the Collingwood Magpies.

Goldstein played one of the best games of his career to date against the Melbourne Demons, in the Round 19, 2009 match at Etihad Stadium. He finished with 5 goals, 25 hitouts and helped his teammates to a 10-goal win. He was awarded 2 Brownlow Medal votes for this game.

In 2010, he played in 21 of 22 games for North Melbourne, and often had to ruck for long periods due to injuries to the Kangaroos other ruckmen, Hamish McIntosh, David Hale and Drew Petrie.

In 2011, he had taken over the number one ruck duties at North Melbourne in the absence of McIntosh and began to establish himself as one of the leagues premier big men. In the round 10 match against the Sydney Swans, he set a career best record of 53 hitouts which he equalled again only 4 weeks later.

By 2015, he had established himself as an elite ruckman, ranking as the number 1 ruck in the competition, and number 4 player overall. In a poll by AFL.com in May, 81% of respondents considered him the best current ruck in the AFL. His season was rewarded with the Syd Barker Medal, as North Melbourne's best-and-fairest player. He was also named in the 2015 All-Australian team.

Also in the 2015 season, Goldstein became the first player in VFL/AFL history to win 1000 hitouts in a single season, and in round 12 against Greater Western Sydney, broke the record of most hitouts in a single game with 80 total.

=== Essendon ===
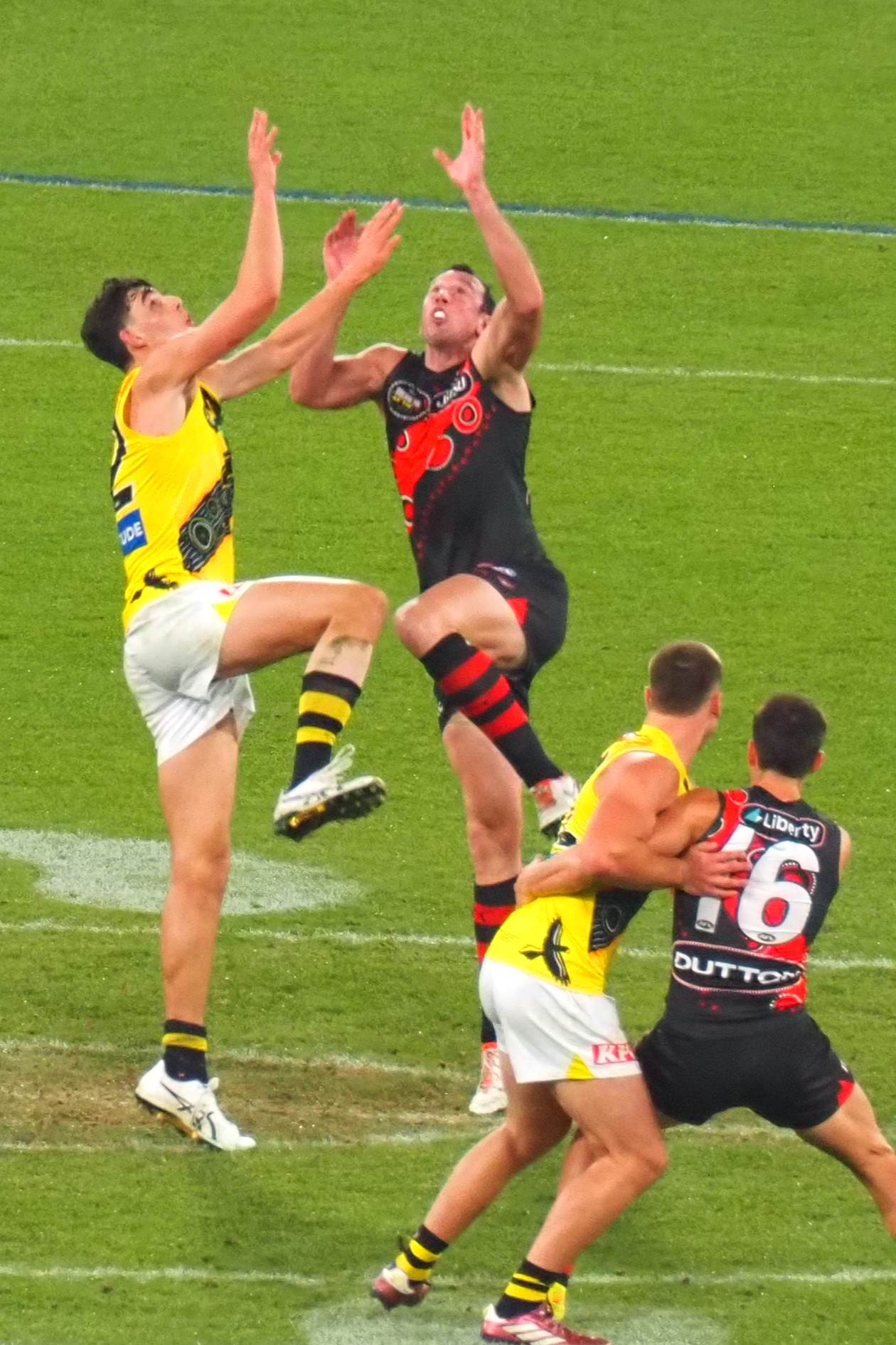
Goldstein (centre) playing for Essendon in 2025

Goldstein moved to Essendon as a free agent in October 2023. Signing a one-year contract, Goldstein would go on to play 14 games in his first season with the Bombers, acting as a guiding support for Essendon's younger rucks. He averaged 10.2 disposals and 24.6 hitouts a game. At the end of the 2024 AFL season, Goldstein signed a one-year contract extension to the end of 2025.

During the 2025 AFL season, Goldstein's role was expected to be as a coach for the younger rucks. However, after season-ending injuries to Nick Bryan and Sam Draper, Goldstein became the first-choice ruck. He played 16 games in 2025, with an average of 12 disposals and 26.7 hitouts a game.

Goldstein was delisted at the end of the 2025 season. Despite being 37 years of age, Goldstein signalled his intention to continue playing at a third club if he could find a suitor. In November 2025, Goldstein officially announced his retirement from the AFL after being unable to find a suitor. After announcing his retirement, Goldstein stayed with Essendon as a part-time ruck coach for 2026.

== Personal life ==
Son of Andrea and Jeff, and brother of Luke and Kye, Goldstein grew up in the inner eastern suburbs of Melbourne. His schooling involved attending Trinity Grammar School (in secondary school), and Preshil (in primary school). He has Jewish ancestry on his father’s side.

Goldstein has five children: Olivia, Mackenzie and Lachlan with his first wife, Kirsty, and Hayley and Charlie with his second wife, Felicity.

Goldstein studied a juris doctor degree at Deakin University. He had previously completed a Bachelor of Applied Management from Federation University.

== Statistics ==
Legend
G	Goals	K	Kicks	D	Disposals	T	Tackles
B	Behinds	H	Handballs	M	Marks	H/O	Hit-outs

Led the league after season and finals

Season	Team	No.	Games	Totals								Averages (per game)								Votes
Season	Team	No.	Games	G	B	K	H	D	M	T	H/O	G	B	K	H	D	M	T	H/O	Votes
2007	North Melbourne	22	0	—	—	—	—	—	—	—	—	—	—	—	—	—	—	—	—	0
2008	North Melbourne	22	3	2	0	8	8	16	6	4	29	0.7	0.0	2.7	2.7	5.3	2.0	1.3	9.7	0
2009	North Melbourne	22	13	9	4	45	59	104	36	18	179	0.7	0.3	3.5	4.5	8.0	2.8	1.4	13.8	2
2010	North Melbourne	22	21	10	12	123	121	244	90	70	367	0.5	0.6	5.9	5.8	11.6	4.3	3.3	17.5	0
2011	North Melbourne	22	21	13	6	151	137	288	73	92	741	0.6	0.3	7.2	6.5	13.7	3.5	4.4	35.3	6
2012	North Melbourne	22	21	2	4	114	143	257	56	53	663	0.1	0.2	5.4	6.8	12.2	2.7	2.5	31.6	6
2013	North Melbourne	22	22	13	4	113	150	263	66	65	822	0.6	0.2	5.1	6.8	12.0	3.0	3.0	37.4	7
2014	North Melbourne	22	24	10	7	98	190	288	52	114	838	0.4	0.3	4.1	7.9	12.0	2.2	4.8	34.9	3
2015	North Melbourne	22	24	11	10	157	195	352	100	102	1058	0.5	0.4	6.5	8.1	14.7	4.2	4.3	44.1	18
2016	North Melbourne	22	22	20	7	128	175	303	69	69	804	0.9	0.3	5.8	8.0	13.8	3.1	3.1	36.5	11
2017	North Melbourne	22	19	12	6	94	161	255	54	55	576	0.6	0.3	4.9	8.5	13.4	2.8	2.9	30.3	0
2018	North Melbourne	22	22	12	5	139	181	320	74	63	783	0.5	0.2	6.3	8.2	14.5	3.4	2.9	35.6	6
2019	North Melbourne	22	22	5	7	139	230	369	62	38	737	0.2	0.3	6.3	10.5	16.8	2.8	1.7	33.5	5
2020 (Note: The 2020 season was played with 17 home-and-away matches per team (down from 22) and 16-minute quarters with time on (down from 20-minute quarters with time on) due to the impact of the COVID-19 pandemic.)	North Melbourne	22	17	6	6	105	148	253	33	36	474	0.4	0.4	6.2	8.7	14.9	1.9	2.1	27.9	5
2021	North Melbourne	22	22	12	4	160	154	314	80	42	655	0.5	0.2	7.3	7.0	14.3	3.6	1.9	29.8	2
2022	North Melbourne	22	22	16	6	106	180	286	58	42	527	0.7	0.3	4.8	8.2	13.0	2.6	1.9	24.0	0
2023	North Melbourne	22	20	4	2	99	161	260	45	38	584	0.2	0.1	5.0	8.1	13.0	2.3	1.9	29.2	0
2024	Essendon	17	14	2	1	44	99	143	25	26	344	0.1	0.1	3.1	7.1	10.2	1.8	1.9	24.6	0
2025	Essendon	17	16	1	0	60	132	192	42	19	427	0.1	0.0	3.8	8.3	12.0	2.6	1.2	26.7	0
Career			345	160	91	1883	2624	4507	1021	946	10608	0.5	0.3	5.5	7.6	13.1	3.0	2.7	30.7	71
