= John Turner (cricketer, born 1816) =

English clergyman and cricketer

Personal information
- Full name: John Bowman Turner
- Born: 8 July 1816; Clapham, Surrey, England; Or; Clapton, Middlesex, England
- Died: 7 February 1892 (aged 75); Norwich, Norfolk, England
- Batting: Right-handed

Domestic team information
- Years: Team
- 1841: Cambridge University

Career statistics
Competition	First-class
Matches	2
Runs scored	41
Batting average	10.25
100s/50s	–/–
Top score	29
Catches/stumpings	1/–
- Source: Cricinfo, 25 January 2023

John Bowman Turner (6 July 1816 – 7 February 1892) was an English clergyman and a cricketer who played in two first-class cricket matches for Cambridge University in 1841. One source states that he was born in Clapham, then part of Surrey; another indicates his birthplace was at Clapton in Middlesex. He died at Norwich, Norfolk.

Turner was educated at Blackheath Proprietary School and at Gonville and Caius College, Cambridge. He played as a batsman in his two first-class cricket games for the university, but it is not known if he batted right- or left-handed. There is no record that he bowled in either match. In the first game, against Marylebone Cricket Club, he was Cambridge's top scorer with an innings of 29 in the second innings of the game, and this was his highest score. In the University Match against Oxford University, he made scores of 10 and 1 in a game that finished with Cambridge winning by just eight runs.

Turner graduated from Cambridge University in 1842 with a Bachelor of Arts degree that automatically upgraded to a Master of Arts in 1845. He was ordained as a deacon in the Church of England in 1843 and became a priest the following year. After serving as curate at Wartling in Sussex, he was appointed as curate of Barford, Norfolk in 1848, and became the rector there in 1859, a post he retained to his death in 1892.
