= All My Friends Are Dead =

2010 dark comedy book by Avery Monsen and Jory John

- First Edition Cover
- Author: Avery Monsen and Jory John
- Illustrator: Avery Monsen
- Language: English
- Genre: Humor
- Publisher: Chronicle Books
- Publication date: August 1, 2010
- Publication place: United States
- Media type: Print (hardcover)
- Pages: 96 (first edition, hardcover)
- ISBN: 0-8118-7455-9 (first edition, hardcover)
- Followed by: All My Friends Are Still Dead

All My Friends Are Dead is a dark comedy book written and illustrated in a children's picture book style. It was written by Avery Monsen and Jory John and illustrated by Avery Monsen. The book was published by Chronicle Books in 2010.

An animated GIF of the first 10 pages of the book was posted on Tumblr and quickly became the most reblogged and liked post in Tumblr's history. The viral website was also reported in New York magazine. It appeared on the bestseller lists of the San Francisco Chronicle, Boston Globe, and Los Angeles Times.

A sequel, All My Friends Are Still Dead, was released in 2012.

== Synopsis ==
A number of anthropomorphic characters make statements about their friends, usually that they are all dead. One of them, a tree, reflects wistfully on the nature of life, and is then cut down and made into an end table.
