= Charlie Thorpe (musician) =

Australian pop singer

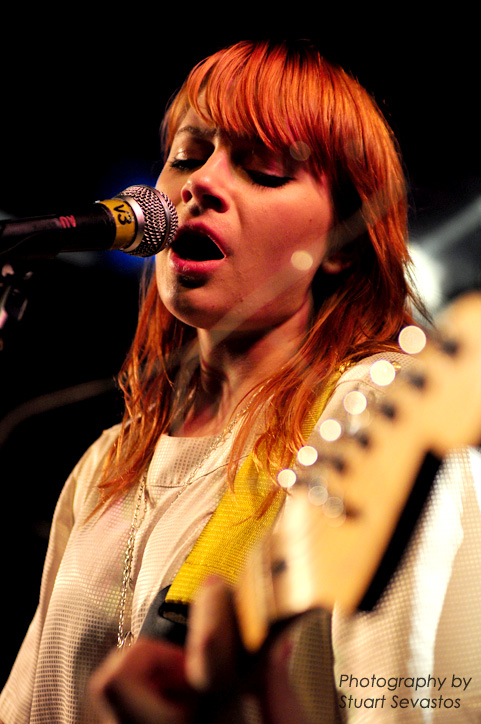
- Charlie Thorpe as Dash, Rosemount Hotel, June 2009

Background information
- Also known as: Dash; Charlz
- Born: Charlotte Thorpe; 1990 (age 35–36)
- Origin: Melbourne, Victoria, Australia
- Genre: Indie pop
- Occupation: Musician
- Instruments: Vocals; guitar
- Years active: 2002–present
- Labels: Universal; Whitehouse/Kobalt
- Formerly of: Dash and Will
- Website: facebook.com/CallMeCharlz

Charlotte "Charlie" Thorpe (born 1990) who performs as Charlz (previously as Dash) is an Australian indie pop musician and songwriter. As Dash she was one-half of the pop rock duo, Dash and Will, from 2005 to 2011 with Josie de Sousa-Reay as Will. Since 2011 the artist performs as Charlz and contributes as a songwriter to screen music for film, television and ads.

== Biography ==
Charlotte Thorpe was born in 1990 and grew up in Melbourne's North Carlton. Thorpe has a Polish parent; She was a competitive equestrian. her father is a guitarist and American-based musician, Brody Dalle (née Brea Robinson) is a cousin. According to Thorpe, if she had been a boy she would have been named Dash. From 1999 to 2007 she attended Preshil, an independent P-12 school, starting at year four. She met her future music collaborator, Josie de Sousa-Reay, and the pair started performing together from the age of twelve. Also attending Preshill was the son of Barry Palmer (ex-Hunters & Collectors).

Thorpe on co-lead vocals and guitar and de Sousa-Reay on vocals formed a pop rock duo, Dash and Will in 2005. A demo by the duo was recorded by Barb Waters, which finished second in the annual Music Oz competition. They were signed by Palmer to his label, Gigantically Small, in the following year. Thorpe was signed to Universal Music Australia at the age of 18 and with Mushroom Publishing as a songwriter.

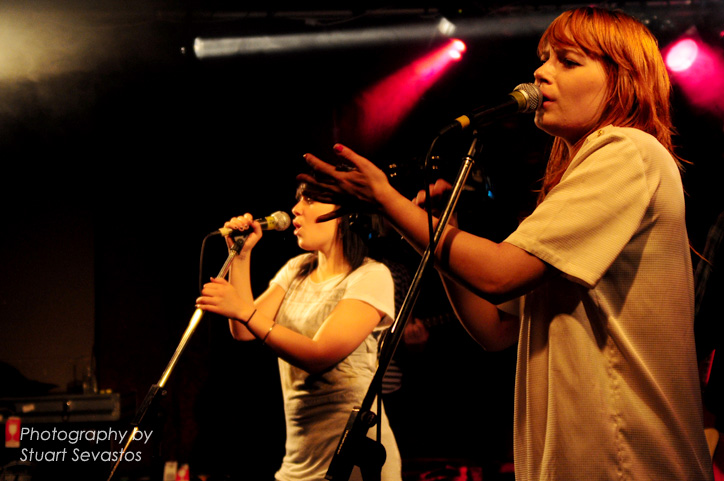
Dash and Will (Thorpe at right), performing at Rosemount Hotel, June 2009

Dash and Will toured supporting visiting artists including two tours with British indie rockers, the Kooks – first in August–September 2008 and again in January of the following year. The duo's single, "Fighting over Nothing", peaked at No. 19 on the ARIA Hitseekers Chart in November 2008. In March 2010 Thorpe reflected on her writing style, she does not "write on demand" but has "a notebook handy to jot things down in and her iPhone" is used to record impromptu song ideas. The duo supported Justin Bieber on the Australian leg of his My World Tour in May 2011. The duo disbanded late that year.

Thorpe has appeared on Australian TV programs, Saturday Disney, RocKwiz and Spicks and Specks. From October 2009 she co-hosted, with de Sousa-Reay, four episodes of a music-based children's show, The Go Show, on Foxtel's Nickelodeon. Since 2011 she has continued as a songwriter, as well as performing under her solo alias, Charlz. Thorpe has worked with other artists and producers, M-Phazes as well as Deadmau5's signed artist Attlas, and Australian producer, Sunset Child.

Thorpe lived in Los Angeles during the mid-2010s. She wrote and performed "The Music", which was adapted by Flynn Francis and Timothy Metcalfe and covered by German singer, Femme Schmidt, on the latter's album RAW (2016). It received acclaim in a Twitter post by Coldplay's Chris Martin. Thorpe has written screen music for films, television and ad campaigns. Her work has been used for HBO, NBC, Greys Anatomy, PlayStation, Volvo cars, Lexus cars, and Australian TV programs, Home and Away, Neighbours and Packed to the Rafters. In October 2016 the songwriter's "West LA" was a finalist for the Vanda & Young Songwriting Competition.

Thorpe returned to Melbourne in 2017. She co-wrote "About Last Night" with Timothy Davis and Michael Jones. Charlz released an acoustic version of that track as a single, in April 2017, in a collaboration with United Kingdom producer, Maths Time Joy. Clarissa Meneses of HighClouds observed, "This pop-infused, slow jam soliloquy is a representation of Charlz and her roots in pop music. Alongside her deep vocals and her smooth, melodious lyricism, this track features producer, Maths Time Joy in an atmosphere he creates full of creative musical stability." It reached No. 5 on the Spotify Global charts. Thorpe and Ruel supported United States artist, Khalid's 2017 show at Festival Hall. The artist released a single, "Amaze Me", in April 2019 via Whitehouse Music/Kobalt Music. Wonderland magazine's reviewer felt its, "a testimony to her lush, self-assured sound. Expect layered production and swelling eight-part harmonies." Charlz' first solo album was recorded during 2020.
