= Copyright Licensing Agency =

UK non-profit organisation

Copyright Licensing Agency (CLA)
- Industry: Publishing
- Founded: 1983
- Headquarters: 6 Hay's Lane, London, SE1 2HB
- Number of employees: 108
- Website: https://cla.co.uk/

The Copyright Licensing Agency (CLA) is a UK non-profit organisation established in 1983 to perform collective licensing on behalf of its members the Authors' Licensing and Collecting Society (ALCS), Publishers' Licensing Services(PLS), the Design and Artists Collecting Society (DACS) and PICSEL. The Copyright Licensing Agency is based in 6 Hay's Lane, London, SE1 2HB.

== Aim ==
The Copyright Licensing Agency (CLA) is a UK regulated not-for-profit that licenses organisations to lawfully use, copy, and share text and image-based content owned by authors, publishers, and visual artists. Revenues are distributed to owners, ensuring fair compensation for rights holders and support for the UK's creative economy. Recognised by the UK government, CLA supports knowledge sharing and copyright compliance across education, business, and public sectors through blanket licences and digital tools.

CLA provides blanket licences that allow users in the academic, professional, and public sectors to copy and share extracts from books, journals, and other publications without needing to seek individual permissions. Its services include digital tools, such as the Check Permissions tool, which helps users determine whether specific titles are covered under their licence.

As a not-for-profit entity, CLA distributes the revenue it collects from licence sales to its member organisations: the Authors’ Licensing and Collecting Society (ALCS), Publishers’ Licensing Services (PLS), the Design and Artists Copyright Society (DACS), and PICSEL. These organisations, in turn, pay royalties directly to the copyright owners—authors, publishers, and visual artists—whose works are used. This model ensures that creators are fairly compensated and can continue producing high-quality content.

Over the past four decades, CLA has generated more than £1.5 billion in collective licensing revenues, which have been distributed to over 200,000 rights holders. Its licences support the reuse of content by 12.7 million students and over 9.5 million employees across more than 40,000 UK businesses, schools, and universities. Additionally, CLA maintains over 40 international agreements, enabling lawful access to more than 8 million print and digital publications worldwide.

== Copyright Law ==
CLA is a licensing body as defined by the Copyright, Designs and Patents Act 1988.

== Compliance ==
CLA established its compliance arm, Copywatch in 1996. Copywatch was established in 1996 by The Copyright Licensing Agency to counter illegal copying of books, magazines and journals in the business and local authority areas. The company is also a member of the Alliance Against IP Theft and the Trading Standards Institute.
