= John Evan Turner =

Welsh philosopher

- Born: 28 December 1875; Liverpool
- Died: 1947; Walton, Liverpool
- Occupation: Philosopher

John Evan Turner (28 December 1875 – 1947), best known as J. E. Turner was a Welsh idealist philosopher and writer.

Turner was born in the Everton district of Liverpool to Welsh parents. He obtained his BA and MA degrees from University of Liverpool. From 1919, he lectured on philosophy for the University Extension Board. He obtained his PhD from University of Liverpool in 1926 and taught at the university until his retirement in 1941.

In 1919, he wrote a book that developed a critique of William James' philosophical ideas. His doctoral thesis, A Theory of Direct Realism and the Relation of Realism to Idealism was published in 1925. In this thesis he argued that Georg Wilhelm Friedrich Hegel's position was not opposed to realism and is compatible with "the most realistic of modern realisms, so far as these bear upon the independent existence of the perceived physical universe."

Turner defended a form of idealistic monism, which was influenced by Hegel. He has also been described as an exponent of "personalistic theism". Turner was a theist and developed his idealistic philosophy in books such as Personality and Reality (1926) and The Nature of Deity (1927). He argued for the existence of an omnipotent mind, a "supreme self" in the universe. In his book The Nature of Deity he used cosmological and teleological arguments as evidence for the Supreme Self. Philosopher John Stuart Mackenzie commented that Turner was "one of the most notable of the few remaining writers who carry on the tradition of Hegelian idealism" but noted it was doubtful that Turner could offer proof for the Supreme Self and that his statements were suggestive rather than conclusive.

== Personal History ==
Turner was an autodidact, who had no "first degree" i.e. B.A. He developed his thinking while working in his father's drapery business. He was twice married: in 1903 to Winifred (Gwen) Roberts (died 1921)(two sons born 1904 and 1920), and in 1930 to Gladys Baddelly.

== Publications ==
- An Examination of William James's Philosophy: A Critical Essay for the General Reader (1919)
- The Philosophic Basis of Moral Obligation: A Study in Ethics (1924)
- A Theory of Direct Realism and the Relation of Realism to Idealism (1925)
- Personality and Reality: A Proof of the Real Existence of a Supreme Self in the Universe (1926)
- The Nature of Deity: A Sequel to "Personality and Reality" (1927)
- The Revelation of Deity (1931)
- Essentials in the Development of Religion: A Philosophic and Psychological Study (1934)
