= John Turner (1890s footballer) =

English footballer

John Turner was an English footballer. His regular position was at full back. He played for Manchester United and Gravesend United.
