= Up in Something =

Studio album by Dash and Will
- Released: 28 August 2009
- Genre: Indie pop
- Label: Mercury
- Producer: Barry Palmer

Dash and Will chronology
Fighting Over Nothing (2008)	Up in Something (2009)

Up in Something is the debut studio album by Australian indie pop duo Dash and Will, released through Mercury Records on 28 August 2009.

The album peaked at number four on the ARIA Hitseekers chart.

== Track listing ==
1. "Get It" – 2:44
2. "Some Like It Hot" – 3:11
3. "Painful" – 3:23
4. "Pick You Up" – 3:15
5. "Error Error" – 2:48
6. "Didn't Know" – 3:37
7. "Fighting Over Nothing" – 3:00
8. "Save Me" – 3:40
9. "Out of Control" – 3:14
10. "Too Young Too Dumb" – 3:07
11. "Something Wrong" – 2:29
