= John Turner (cricketer, born 1863) =

English cricketer (1863–1924)

Personal information
- Full name: John Alfred Turner
- Born: 10 April 1863; Leicester, Leicestershire, England
- Died: 23 July 1924 (aged 61); Roehampton, London, England
- Batting: Right-handed
- Bowling: Right-arm fast

Domestic team information
- Years: Team
- 1883–1886: Cambridge University
- 1887: Marylebone Cricket Club

Career statistics
Competition	First-class
Matches	36
Runs scored	1,060
Batting average	19.27
100s/50s	2/3
Top score	174
Balls bowled	2,557
Wickets	33
Bowling average	34.42
5 wickets in innings	–
10 wickets in match	–
Best bowling	4/46
Catches/stumpings	24/–
- Source: Cricinfo, 25 January 2023

John Alfred Turner (10 April 1863 – 23 July 1924) was an English cricketer who played first-class cricket for Cambridge University, the Marylebone Cricket Club (MCC) and other amateur sides between 1883 and 1890. Born in Leicester, he died in Roehampton, London.

Turner was the son of Luke Turner, a manufacturer of elastic webbing in Leicester whose factory is now a listed building. He received his education at Uppingham School and Trinity College, Cambridge. At both Uppingham and Cambridge, Turner played cricket as a right-handed middle-order batsman – occasionally opening the battling – and a right-arm fast bowler, although he was rarely one of his teams' main bowlers. Without ever achieving much in the matches themselves, he was picked for the University Match against Oxford University in each of his four seasons at Cambridge. Turner's standout performances came in 1885 and 1886. In 1885, he scored an unbeaten 109 against a scratch side raised by A. J. Webbe. The following year, against another scratch side, this time raised by C. I. Thornton, he made a second innings 174 which was instrumental in enabling Cambridge to win the match after being made to follow on. The innings cemented his reputation, earning him a spot in the Gentlemen v Players match at The Oval later that season, though he failed to make an impact. At the end of both the 1885 and 1886 English cricket seasons, Turner joined in North American cricket tour organized by the Devonian amateur Ned Sanders. These tours featured two first-class matches each, with Turner achieving his best bowling figures of four wickets for 46 runs (in 50 four-ball overs) in a game against the "Gentlemen of Philadelphia" during the 1885 tour. After graduating from Cambridge University in 1886, Turner played only a few more first-class matches. However, he continued to appear in minor matches for Leicestershire (not then a first-class team) until 1892 and for the amateur I Zingari side until 1894.

Turner graduated from Cambridge University with a Bachelor of Laws (LlB) degree, and joined the Inner Temple. He was called to the bar and practised as a barrister on the Midland Circuit. His address at the time of his death in 1924 was in Knightsbridge, London, though he died in The Priory, Roehampton.
