= Authors' Licensing and Collecting Society =

British collecting society

Authors' Licensing and Collecting Society (ALCS)
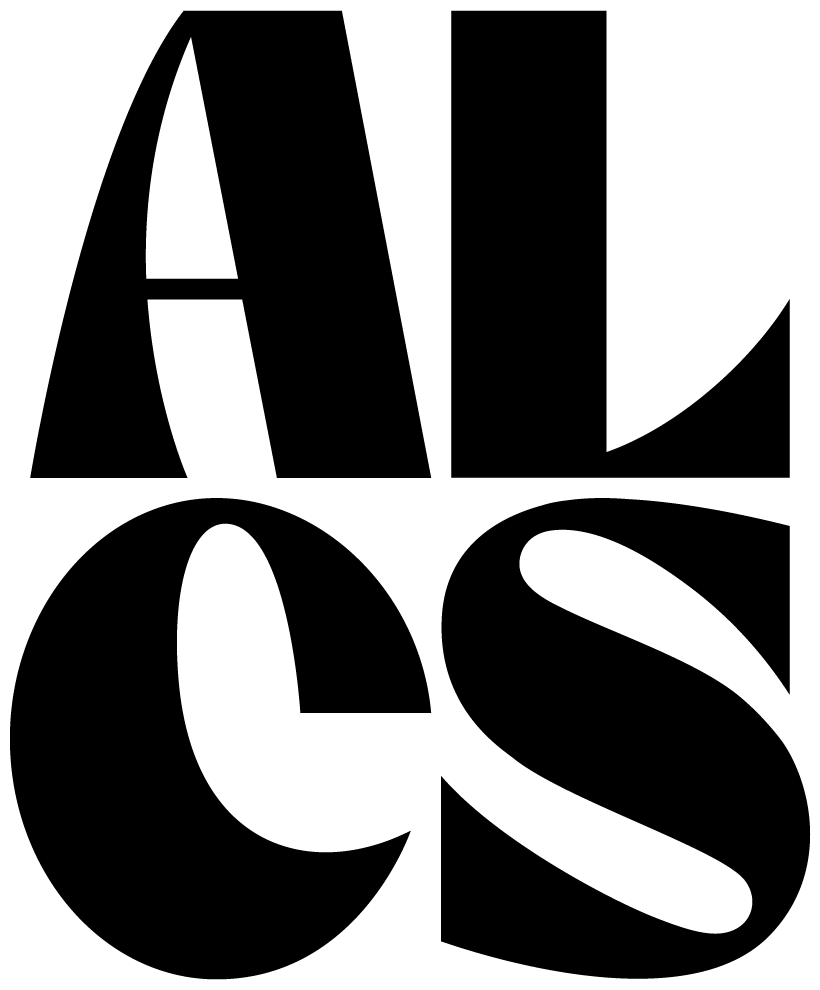
- Company type: Company limited by guarantee
- Founded: 26 April 1977; 49 years ago
- Headquarters: International House, 1 St Katharine's Way; London; EW1 1UN, England, UK
- Area served: United Kingdom
- Key people: Maureen Duffy (Honorary President), Barbara Hayes (Chief Executive), The Lord Clement-Jones (Chair).
- Services: Copyright collective
- Website: alcs.co.uk

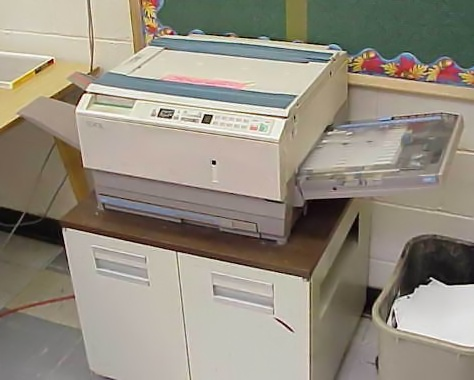
The ALCS collects on behalf of its members and distributes to them royalties for, among other things, the photocopying of authors' works.

The Authors' Licensing and Collecting Society (ALCS) is a British organisation that works to ensure that writers are fairly compensated for any of their works that are copied, broadcast or recorded. It has operated in the United Kingdom since 1977. From that year to 2026, the ALCS distributed more than £750 million to authors, and at the end of 2026 had in excess of 130,000 members.

== History ==
ALCS was founded in 1977 after a long campaign in the United Kingdom by the Writers' Action Group (WAG) for writers to receive remuneration for the lending of their works by libraries. Then known as the Authors' Lending and Copyright Society, it was incorporated on 26 April 1977 to handle:

- payments from Verwertungsgesellschaft Wort (VG Wort – the Word Exploitation Corporation) for the German public lending right (PLR);
- the British PLR;
- Belgian cable television; and
- reprography (photocopying) royalties.

However, the organization that was eventually responsible for distributing the fees obtained from the lending of books in libraries was the Public Lending Right.

In 1982, The Copyright Licensing Agency was founded by ALCS and the Publishers Licensing Society (PLS). ALCS receives the majority of its income (65–70%) from the CLA's photocopying licensing schemes.

== Aims and operation ==
ALCS represents the interests of many UK writers and aims to ensure they are fairly compensated for any works that are copied, broadcast or recorded. The organisation is dedicated to protecting and promoting authors' rights:

- by encouraging the establishment of collective licensing schemes, where appropriate, and ensuring that fees resulting from such schemes are efficiently collected and distributed; and
- by building an understanding of the value of the contribution writers make to society.

ALCS's Ordinary Members sign a mandate that authorizes the Society to license and collect royalties on their behalf. ALCS is granted authority to exercise rights on each author's behalf as part of schemes for the collective administration of royalties in the UK and abroad. The rights range from photocopying, scanning and cable retransmission in the UK and internationally to reproduction in journals. The authority entitles ALCS in agreed circumstances to permit or forbid the exercise of the rights, grant licences, collect fees for use and damages for misuse and take action to defend and protect the rights. ALCS works closely with other writers organisations such as The Society of Authors and Writers' Guild of Great Britain.

From its inception in 1977, ALCS has distributed more than £650 million to authors, and in the financial year 2022–23 it paid £44 million to more than 100,000 writers.

As an authority on copyright matters and authors' interests, the ALCS is committed to fostering an awareness of intellectual property issues among the writing community. It monitors matters affecting copyright both in the UK and internationally, and makes regular representations on writers' behalf to the UK government and the European Commission. ALCS also administers the All Party Writers Group.

== Governance ==
The ALCS is governed by a board of nine directors, the majority of whom are working writers. The Board is responsible for the overall performance of the Society, which is incorporated as a company limited by guarantee.
