= Jack Turner (Australian footballer) =

Australian rules footballer (1926–2016)

Personal information
- Full name: Jack Turner
- Born: 24 June 1926
- Died: 20 December 2016 (aged 90)
- Original team: Richmond Recruits
- Height: 183 cm (6 ft 0 in)
- Weight: 86 kg (190 lb)

Playing career^{1}
Years	Club	Games (Goals)
1945–47	Richmond	13 (0)
- ^{1} Playing statistics correct to the end of 1947.

Jack Turner (24 June 1926 – 20 December 2016) was an Australian rules footballer who played with Richmond in the Victorian Football League (VFL).
