= Something's Wrong (children's book) =

2021 children's book by Jory John

Something's Wrong!
- Author: Jory John
- Illustrators: Erin Kraan
- Language: English
- Genre: Children's literature, Picture book
- Publisher: Farrar, Straus and Giroux/Macmillian
- Publication date: March 23, 2021
- Publication place: United States
- Media type: Print
- ISBN: 978-0-37-431388-3

Something's Wrong!: A Bear, a Hare, and Some Underwear is a children's book written by Jory John, illustrated by Erin Kraan, and published March 23, 2021 by Farrar, Straus and Giroux.

== Reception ==
Something's Wrong! received a starred review from Kirkus Reviews and School Library Journal. Kirkus said, "This underwear affair is wise, witty, and just brief enough." School Library Journal's John Scott told readers to "expect hilarity to ensue wherever underwear stories are a hit with the add-on bonus of this being a great title for discussions on the topic of allyship."

Publishers Weekly's review highlighted Erin Kraan's talent as an illustrator, saying the "textural earth-toned vignettes are gems of comic panic, dismay, and redemption." In a positive review, Becca Worthington, writing for Booklist, wrote that Something's Wrong!

is as whip-smart and linguistically sophisticated as the rest of John’s terrific body of work. The ongoing joke of breaking the fourth wall of the book is clever, interactive, and well executed, culminating in a wonderful two-page wordless spread that captures the mounting tension of the moment. The story is strongly supported by Kraan’s richly textured and slightly off-kilter collection of creatures, featuring the most adorably rounded tighty-whitey-clad bear buns you’ve ever seen.

The Bulletin of the Center for Children's Books's Kate Quealy-Gainer provided a mixed review, indicating that "Bear’s rambling makes the story a bit text heavy, but Anders the hare is terrifically amusing as the droll friend who breaks the news to Jeff." She also highlighted the aesthetic of the book, writing, "Block-print illustrations offer intricate lines and textures, and the solid, grounded art offers an effective steadiness in the face of Jeff ’s increasing panic."
