= John Frayn Turner =

John Frayn Turner (9 August 1923 – 2 March 2015) was a British author specializing in military history.

== Bibliography ==
- V.C.'s of the Royal Navy. London: George Harrap & Co. 1956. ISBN 978-0-85686-043-0.
- Hovering Angels: the record of the Royal Navy's helicopters. London: George Harrap & Co. 1957.
- Invasion '44 – the full story of D-Day. London: George Harrap & Co. 1959. ISBN 978-0-7278-0040-4.
- A Girl Called Johnnie: Three weeks in an open boat. London: George Harrap & Co. 1963.
- The Bader Wing. London: Midas Books. 1981. ISBN 978-1-84415-544-6.
- Service Most Silent. Pen and Sword Books. 2008. ISBN 978-1-84415-726-6.
