= Pete Oswald =

American illustrator (born 1980)

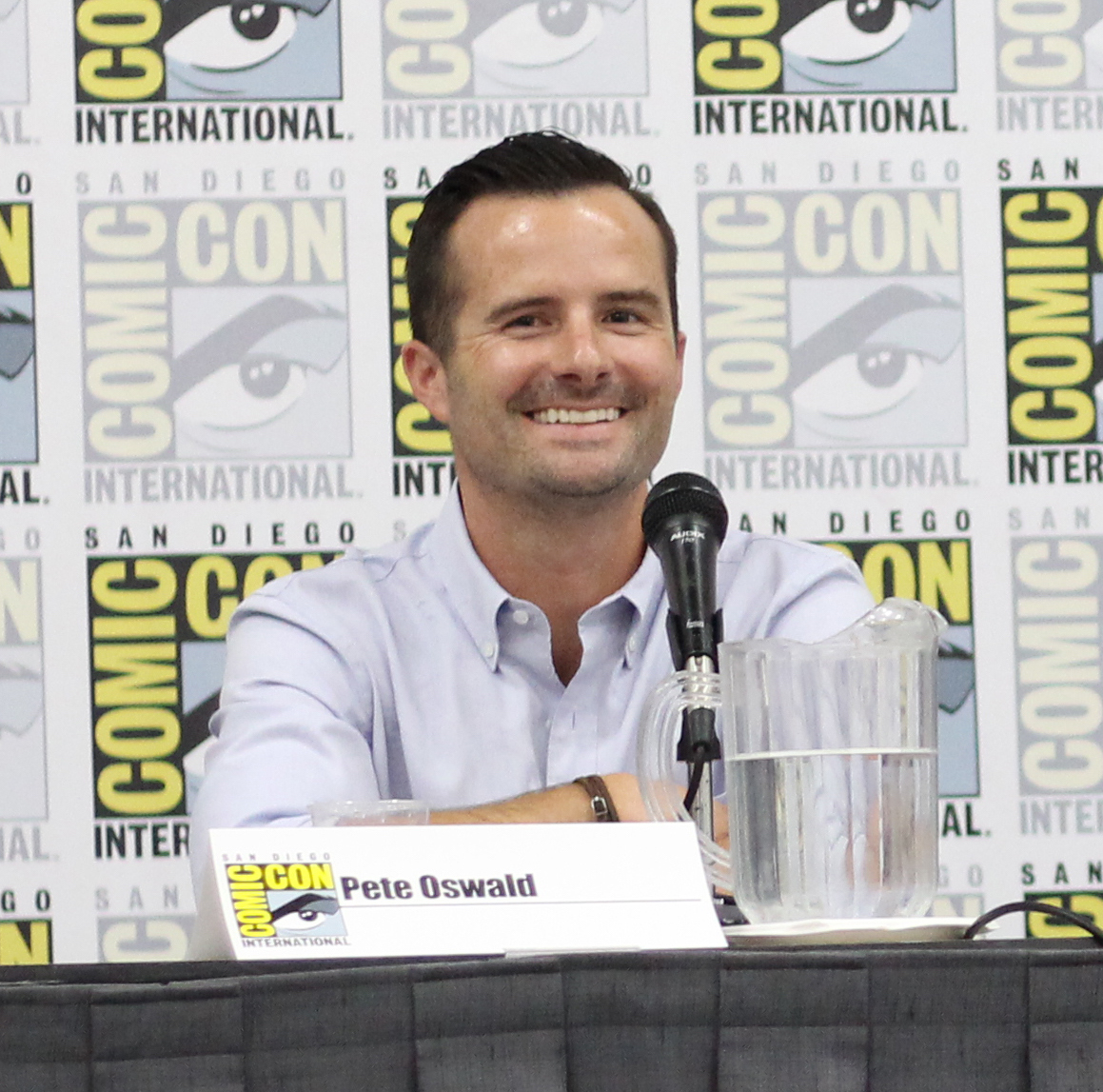
- Oswald in 2016
- Born: Peter Jacob Oswald; July 8, 1980 (age 46); Salt Lake City, Utah, U.S.
- Education: Loyola Marymount University
- Known for: Production design
- Notable work: The Garfield Movie; The Angry Birds Movie; ParaNorman
- Style: Animation; Stop motion Book illustration Painting
- Website: www.peteoswald.com

Pete Oswald (born July 8, 1980) is an illustrator and production designer, best known for The Angry Birds Movie film series and ParaNorman. He is also known for his work as a children's book author and illustrator, and painter. Pete's work includes the #1 New York Times bestselling picture book, The Good Egg, and the #2 New York Times bestselling picture book, The Bad Seed, both part of the Food Group series written by Jory John.

== Early life and education ==
Oswald was raised in Bountiful, Utah. His mother, also an artist, encouraged him to begin painting and drawing from an early age. He attended Judge Memorial High School, where he played baseball and basketball, in Salt Lake City, Utah.

After graduating high school in 1999, he relocated to Los Angeles where he enrolled in Loyola Marymount University and earned a degree in animation arts. He then began working in Los Angeles in film and television animation.

He cites his artistic influences as Pablo Picasso, Claude Monet, Gustav Klimt, Miroslav Šašek, Charles and Ray Eames, Mary Blair, Ronald Searle, and Al Hirschfeld.

== Career ==
Oswald is the illustrator of all books in Jory John's The Food Group series, including The Bad Seed, The Good Egg, The Cool Bean, The Couch Potato, The Smart Cookie, The Sour Grape, and The Big Cheese. The Bad Seed was described by The New York Times as "kid-book humor at its best, both warmhearted and frisky — the kind that leaves adults, too, cracking up and grateful." The bestselling duo also created That’s What Dinosaurs Do together. Oswald's authorial debut, Hike, was shortlisted for the CILIP Kate Greenaway Medal. He released his next book The Noise Inside Boys: A Story About Big Feelings in 2023, inspired by his own experiences raising his three sons. Oswald also co-created the children's book Mingo the Flamingo.

Oswald has served in production design and the art department on multiple animated family studio films and television shows. He is best known for his work on the 2016 film The Angry Birds Movie, for which he transformed the characters, lighting, and set design from the popular mobile game into an animated feature film series over the course of four years. He was noted for his work on The Angry Birds Movie in Vice's The Creator's Project, which stated: "Pete Oswald's fingerprints are all over the cutting edge of animated feature films, marked by a bright, colorful, slightly angular style." In 2016, he appeared at Comic-Con in San Diego, California. In 2019, Oswald returned to the franchise as production designer on The Angry Birds Movie 2. He also served as production designer on 2024's The Garfield Movie. Oswald spent over four years on the project, taking inspiration from Jim Davis' Garfield comic strips of the 1980s in creating new CG versions of Davis' iconic characters.

Oswald served as a visual artist on the popular animated films Madagascar: Escape 2 Africa, Cloudy with a Chance of Meatballs, Cloudy with a Chance of Meatballs 2, ParaNorman, Hotel Transylvania, and The Lego Ninjago Movie.

He also paints with acrylics, in addition to his animation and illustration work, and debuted his painting series Pacific Abstract, inspired by the California coast, at a pop-up art gallery show at Bergamot Station in Santa Monica, California, in 2016.

== Filmography ==
=== Film ===
Year	Title	Position	Note(s)
2008	Madagascar: Escape 2 Africa	Character designer	
2009	The Story of Walls	Director, production designer	Nominated: Annie Award for "Best Animated Short" (2009)
2009	Cloudy with a Chance of Meatballs	Visual Development Artist	
2012	ParaNorman	Concept artist	Nominated: Annie Award for Production Design in an Animated Feature Production (2013)
2012	Hotel Transylvania	Character designer	
2013	Cloudy with a Chance of Meatballs 2	Visual development artist, designer	
2015	The Flintstones & WWE: Stone Age Smackdown!	Background painter	
2016	The Angry Birds Movie	Art director, production designer	
2019	The Angry Birds Movie 2	Production designer	
2024	The Garfield Movie	Production designer	

=== Television ===
Year	Title	Position	Note(s)
2004	Johnny Bravo	Production assistant	Episode: "It's a Magical Life/The Hunk at the End of This Cartoon"
2004-07	Foster's Home for Imaginary Friends	Character designer, animation processor, character layout artist, special poses	28 episodes
2010	Doubtsourcing	Production designer	TV mini-series Episode: "The Wall"; Nominated: Annie Award for Production Design in an Animated Television Production (2011)
2010	The Ricky Gervais Show	Additional background artist, character designer, background designer	7 episodes
2011	The Looney Tunes Show	Background painter	Episode: "The Float"

=== Book illustrations ===
- Attack of the Underwear Dragon (2020) and Return of the Underwear Dragon (2021)

== Awards and nominations ==
Year	Nominee / work	Award	Result
2009	The Story of Walls	Annie Award for Best Animated Short	Nominated
2011	Doubtsourcing	Annie Award for Production Design in an Animated Television Production	Nominated
2013	ParaNorman	Annie Award for Production Design in an Animated Feature Production	Nominated
