= John Turner (Oxford University cricketer) =

English cricketer, clergyman

Personal information
- Full name: John Turner
- Born: c. 1816; Bloomsbury, London, England
- Died: 30 July 1858 (aged 41/42); Southampton, Hampshire, England
- Batting: Unknown
- Bowling: Unknown

Domestic team information
- Years: Team
- 1837: Oxford University

Career statistics
Competition	First-class
Matches	2
Runs scored	64
Batting average	21.33
100s/50s	–/–
Top score	35
Balls bowled	?
Wickets	1
Bowling average	?
5 wickets in innings	–
10 wickets in match	–
Best bowling	1/?
Catches/stumpings	4/–
- Source: Cricinfo, 25 March 2020

John Turner (circa 1816 – 30 July 1858) was an English first-class cricketer and clergyman.

The son of John Turner senior, he was born at Bloomsbury circa 1816. He was educated at Winchester College, before going up to Balliol College, Oxford. While studying at Oxford, he played first-class cricket for Oxford University on two occasions in 1837, both against the Marylebone Cricket Club at Oxford and Lord's respectively. He scored a total of 64 runs in his two matches, with a high score of 35.

After graduating from Oxford, he took holy orders in the Church of England. He was the rector of Tiffield in Northamptonshire from 1853, until his death at Southampton in July 1858.
