= John Turner (cricketer, born 1854) =

English cricketer

Personal information
- Full name: John Turner
- Born: 1 November 1854; Northampton, Northamptonshire, England
- Died: 22 October 1912 (aged 57); Bexhill-on-Sea, Sussex, England
- Batting: Right-handed

Domestic team information
- Years: Team
- 1876–1883: Marylebone Cricket Club

Career statistics
| Competition | First-class |
|---|---|
| Matches | 20 |
| Runs scored | 417 |
| Batting average | 12.26 |
| 100s/50s | –/1 |
| Top score | 65 |
| Catches/stumpings | 9/– |
- Source: Cricinfo, 17 June 2021

John Turner (1 November 1854 – 22 October 1912) was an English first-class cricketer.

Turner was born at Northampton in November 1854. He played first-class cricket for the Marylebone Cricket Club (MCC), making his debut for the club against Yorkshire at Lord's in 1876. He played first-class cricket for the MCC until 1883, making a total of twenty first-class matches, including one match for the Gentlemen of Marylebone Cricket Club against Kent at the Canterbury Cricket Week of 1876. A right-handed batsman, he scored 417 runs from his twenty matches at an average of 12.26. He made one half century, a score of 65 against Kent in 1881. By profession he was a merchant and had retired to Bexhill-on-Sea in his later years. Turner suffered from depression and had previously been admitted to a mental hospital. He committed suicide by shooting himself in the forehead on the morning of 22 October 1912, with his body being found by his wife 15 minutes later.
