= Jory John =

American author of children's books

Jory John is an American author of children's books. He is known for incorporating dark humor and discussing difficult topics in his books.

His books have landed on the New York Times bestseller list, including the first (The Good Egg) and second positions (The Bad Seed). He has also been an E.B. White Read-Aloud Honor recipient twice.

== Career ==
Early in his career, Jory John volunteered, interned, then was hired as the programs director at 826 Valencia, an educational nonprofit in the Mission District of San Francisco, where he worked from 2004 to 2009. During his time there, he ideated, programmed, and created Thanks and Have Fun Running the Country: Kids' Letters to President Obama.

John left his position at 826 Valencia to focus more on his own writing, publishing All My Friends Are Dead with Avery Monsen the following year.

Beyond books, John has written for the New York Times, The Guardian, the San Francisco Chronicle, the Believer, McSweeney's Internet Tendency, and BuzzFeed.

== Books ==
=== Critter Jitters series ===
- First Day Critter Jitters (2020)
- Summer Camp Critter Jitters (2021)

=== The Food Group series ===
All The Food Group books were illustrated by Pete Oswald and published by HarperCollins.

- The Bad Seed (2017)
- The Good Egg (2019)
- The Cool Bean (2019)
- The Good Egg Presents: The Great Eggscape! (2020)
- The Couch Potato (2020)
- The Bad Seed Presents: The Good, the Bad, and the Spooky (2021)
- The Smart Cookie (2021)
- The Sour Grape (2022)
- The Big Cheese (2023)
- The Humble Pie (2025)

=== Animal Problems series ===
The Animal Problems books were illustrated by Lane Smith and published by Random House Books for Young Readers.

- Penguin Problems (2016)
- Giraffe Problems (2018)
- Cat Problems (2021)

=== The Terrible Two series ===
The Terrible Two books were co-written with Mac Barnett, illustrated by Kevin Cornell, and published by Harry N. Abrams.

- The Terrible Two (2015)
- The Terrible Two Get Worse (2016)
- The Terrible Two Go Wild (2018)
- The Terrible Two's Last Laugh (2018)

=== Goodnight Already! series ===
The Goodnight Already! books were illustrated by Benji Davies and published by HarperCollins.

- Goodnight Already! (2014)
- I Love You Already! (2015)
- Come Home Already! (2017)
- All Right Already! (2018)

=== All My Friends ... series ===
The All My Friends... books were co-written with Avery Monsen and published by Chronicle Books.

- All My Friends Are Dead (2010)
- All My Friends Are Still Dead (2012)

=== Standalone books ===
- Pirate's Log: A Handbook for Aspiring Swashbucklers with Avery Monsen (2008)
- I Feel Relatively Neutral About New York with Avery Monsen (2011)
- K is for Knifeball: An Alphabet of Terrible Advice with Avery Monsen (2012)
- I Will Chomp You! (2015)
- Quit Calling Me a Monster! (2016)
- Can Somebody Please Scratch My Back? (2018)
- I Miss You, Barack Obama: 44 Postcards for All Occasions to Send to Anyone Who Misses the 44th President (2018)
- That's What Dinosaurs Do (2019)
- It's Not My Fault! (2020)
- Something's Wrong!: A Bear, a Hare, and Some Underwear (2021)
- This Book Will Get You to Sleep! (2022)
- Definitely a Unicorn (2022)
- The Alderweireld Book (2023)

=== Editor ===
- Thanks and Have Fun Running the Country: Kids' Letters to President Obama (2009)
