= John Stewart Turner =

John Stewart Turner OBE FAA (1908–1991) was an Australian botanist and plant physiologist. He was Professor of Botany and Plant Physiology, University of Melbourne 1938–1973, and was elected a Fellow of the Australian Academy of Science in 1956. He was appointed an Officer of the Order of the British Empire in 1974.

He is sometimes referred to as "John Stuart Turner".

Turner was the first President of the Science Teachers' Association of Victoria and for twenty-five years chaired the General Science Standing Committee of the Schools Board that controlled both the syllabus and the examinations. In 1945 Turner introduced Biology as a senior school subject in Victoria, replacing both Botany, and Animal Morphology and Physiology. He chaired the Biology Standing Committee of the Schools Board for thirty years, culminating in the production, through the Australian Academy of Science, of 'The Web of Life' course that completely re-conceived the purpose, structure and function of biology teaching in Australia.

I have tried to bring home a sense of the miracle of evolution. I have argued that our environmental problems are not to be solved by a return to mysticism but by scientific investigation and a change of heart - a renewal of an old tradition of stewardship. Preaching the virtues of conservation would be unnecessary if only we could open people's eyes to the interest, the beauty and majesty of the planet on which we live: only if we love a place do we wish to save it.
