= Penguin Problems =

Children's picture book by Jory John and Lane Smith

- Author: Jory John
- Illustrator: Lane Smith
- Language: English
- Genre: Children's picture book
- Published: 2016 (Random House)
- Publication place: USA
- Media type: Print (hardback)
- Pages: 29 (unpaginated)
- ISBN: 9780553513370
- OCLC: 960168963

Penguin Problems is a 2016 Children's picture book by Jory John and illustrated by Lane Smith. It is about a penguin that complains about his situation. They would later follow that up with Giraffe Problems (2018) and Cat Problems (2021).

== Reception ==
Penguin Problems was well-received by critics, including a starred review from Kirkus Reviews, who said the book is "well-paced, bursting with humor, and charmingly misanthropic." Jan Carr, writing for Common Sense Media, gave the book four out of five stars.

Multiple praised John's writing. Booklist's Sarah Hunter highlighted the book's "wry humor", as did Publishers Weekly, who said, "John [...] delivers a rat-a-tat series of laughs". Sam Bloom, writing for Horn Book Magazine, added, "The temperature may be below freezing, but the snark level is cranked up high in this collaboration between funnymen John and Smith." The New York Times's Michael Ian Black called the book "funny and acerbic".

Reviewers also highlighted Smith's illustrations, which Booklist's Smith called "distinctive". Publishers Weekly said the "minimalist polar landscapes highlight the penguin's awkward moments". The New York Times's Black highlighted the "evocative illustrations of endless cold, frightful inky depths and the spartan beauty of Antarctic mountain peaks".

School Library Journal's Joy Fleishhacker also complimented the "sublime pairing", which she says "results in a rib-tickling exploration of what it means to look at the unsunny side."

== Awards and honors ==
Penguin Problems is a Junior Library Guild book. The Irish Times named it one of the best children's books of 2016, and Bank Street College of Education included it on their 2017 list of the year's best children's books.

Awards for Penguin Problems
Year	Award	Result	Ref.
2016	Kirkus Prize for Young Readers	Nominee	
2018-2019	Prairie Bloom Book Award	Nominee	
2019	Beehive Award	Nominee	
