= Dressler =

Dressler is a surname of German origin. Notable people with the surname include:

- Conrad Dressler (1856–1940), sculptor and potter
- Erich Dressler, luger
- Ernst Christoph Dressler (1734–1779), German composer, operatic tenor, violinist and music theorist
- Gallus Dressler (1533 – c. 1580/9), composer and music theorist
- Jim Dressler, politician
- Marie Dressler (1868–1934), actress
- Robert Dressler (disambiguation)
- Rudolf Dreßler (1940–2025), politician and ambassador
- Sören Dreßler (born 1975), football player
- Ty Dressler, American politician
- Weston Dressler (born 1985), football player
- William Dressler (disambiguation), several people
- Willy Oskar Dressler (1876–1954), German writer on art and interior decoration
- Wolfgang U. Dressler (born 1939), linguist

== See also ==
- Dressler's syndrome
- Drexler
- Martin Dressler: The Tale of an American Dreamer
