= Drexler =

Drexler is a German surname. Notable people with the surname include:

- Anton Drexler (1884–1942), German politician and early mentor of Adolf Hitler
- Clyde Drexler (born 1962), American basketball player
- Dominick Drexler (born 1990), German footballer
- Doug Drexler, American illustrator and graphic designer
- Hans Drexler, Swiss swimmer
- Henry Clay Drexler (1901–1924), American Medal of Honor recipient
- Hilde Drexler (born 1983), Austrian judoka
- John Michael Drexler (1905–1970), American businessman and politician
- Jorge Drexler (born 1964), Uruguayan musician
- K. Eric Drexler (born 1955), American scientist
- Lynne Mapp Drexler (1928–1999), American painter
- Manfred Drexler (1951–2017), German football player
- Melissa Drexler, American criminal
- Millard Drexler (born 1944), American business executive
- Oskar Drexler (1911–1982), German soldier
- Rosalyn Drexler (1926–2025), American artist, novelist, and playwright
- Sherman Drexler (1925–2014), American artist
- Walter Drexler (1916–1945), German soldier

== Ships ==
- USS Drexler (DD-741), an U.S. Navy Allen M. Sumner-class destroyer, named in honour of Ensign Henry Clay Drexler
- 2019 Drexler-Automotive Formula 3 Cup, the 38th Austria Formula 3 Cup season and the first Drexler-Automotive Formula 3 Cup season

== See also ==
- Drechsler
- Dressler
- Drexel (disambiguation)
- Draxler
- Turner
