= Tourneur =

Tourneur is a French surname, literally meaning "lathe operator". Notable people with the surname include:

- Cyril Tourneur (1575-1626), English dramatist
- Jacques Tourneur (1904-1977), French film director
- Maurice Tourneur (1873-1961), French film director and screenwriter

== See also ==
- Le Tourneur, in France
- Turner (surname)
- Drechsler
- Drexler
