= Mid-range (disambiguation) =

Mid-range is the arithmetic mean of the maximum and the minimum.

It may also refer to:

- Mid-range speaker, a kind of loudspeaker
- Midrange computer, a kind of computer
- Midrange theory, a concept in social sciences
