= Dorothy Ross (historian) =

American historian of social science (1936–2024)

- Born: Dorothy Rabin; August 13, 1936; Milwaukee, Wisconsin, U.S.
- Died: May 22, 2024 (aged 87); Washington, D.C.
- Spouse: Stanford G. Ross (m. 1958–2020)

Academic background
- Education: Smith College (BA 1958); Columbia University (MA 1959; PhD 1965)
- Doctoral advisor: Richard Hofstadter

Academic work
- Discipline: History
- Sub-discipline: History of social science
- Institutions: Princeton University (1972–1978); University of Virginia (1978–1990); Johns Hopkins University (1990–2007)
- Notable students: François Furstenberg; W. Caleb McDaniel

Dorothy Ross (August 13, 1936 – May 22, 2024) was an American historian of social science. She was Arthur O. Lovejoy Professor of History at Johns Hopkins University. Her books include G. Stanley Hall: The Psychologist as Prophet (1972) and The Origins of American Social Science (1991).

== Early life and education ==
Ross was born Dorothy Rabin on August 13, 1936 in Milwaukee, Wisconsin. She earned a BA from Smith College in 1958 and an MA and PhD from Columbia University in 1959 and 1965, respectively. Her PhD advisor was Columbia historian Richard Hofstadter.

In her final position before beginning her teaching career, 1971–1972, Ross served as a special assistant to a newly formed Committee on Women Historians of the American Historical Association intended to improve women's representation in the historical profession.

== Career ==
Ross taught at Princeton University (1972–1978) and at the University of Virginia (1978–1990) before moving Johns Hopkins University. At Johns Hopkins, she chaired the department of history (1993–1996) and became the named chair the Arthur O. Lovejoy Professor of History. She retired emeritus in 2007. Her notable students included François Furstenberg and Pulitzer Prize winner W. Caleb McDaniel.

Her books include G. Stanley Hall: The Psychologist as Prophet (1972) and The Origins of American Social Science (1991). She edited the books Modernist Impulses in the Human Sciences, 1870–1930 (1994) and, with Theodore Porter, The Cambridge History of Science, Vol. 7: The Modern Social Sciences (2003).

She was a fellow at the Center for Advanced Study in the Behavioral Sciences, the Society of American Historians, and the Woodrow Wilson International Center for Scholars.

== Personal life and death ==
Ross was married to Stanford G. Ross after graduating Smith College and they remained married for 62 years before he died in 2020. Together they had two children and two grandchildren. She died on May 22, 2024, at the age of 87, at her home in Washington, D.C.

== Legacy ==
The Society for U.S. Intellectual History named its annual Dorothy Ross Prize after Ross to honor her work in the history of psychology and history of modern social science. Johns Hopkins University named a professorship in history endowed by the Stavros Niarchos Foundation in her honor in 2023, the Dorothy Ross Professor of Political Economy at the Johns Hopkins Agora Institute; the first was Louis Hyman.

== Selected works ==
=== Articles ===
- (1979) “The Liberal Tradition Revisited and the Republican Tradition Addressed,” in New Directions in American Intellectual History, eds. John Higham and Paul K. Conkin. Johns Hopkins University Press.
- (2021) “Whatever Happened to the Social in American Social Thought? Part 1,” Modern Intellectual History, Vol. 18, No. 4, December 2021, pp. 1155–1177. doi:10.1017/S1479244320000529
- (2022) “Whatever Happened to the Social in American Social Thought? Part 2,” Modern Intellectual History, Vol. 19, No. 1, March 2022, pp. 268–296. doi:10.1017/S1479244320000530

=== Books ===
- (1972) G. Stanley Hall: The Psychologist as Prophet. University of Chicago Press.
- (1991) The Origins of American Social Science. Cambridge University Press.
- (1994) Edited, Modernist Impulses in the Human Sciences, 1870–1930. Johns Hopkins University Press.
- (2003) Edited with Theodore Porter, The Cambridge History of Science, Vol. 7: The Modern Social Sciences. Cambridge University Press.
