= William Dressler =

William Dressler may refer to:

- William F. Dressler (fl. 1917), businessman and Nevada state senator
- William Dressler (cardiologist) (1890–1969)
- William Dressler (anthropologist) (born 1951)
- William Dressler (musician) (1826–1914), composer and organist in New York

== See also ==
- Willy Oskar Dressler (1876–1954), German writer on art and interior decoration
