= Lester Frank Ward =

American scientist and sociologist (1841–1913)

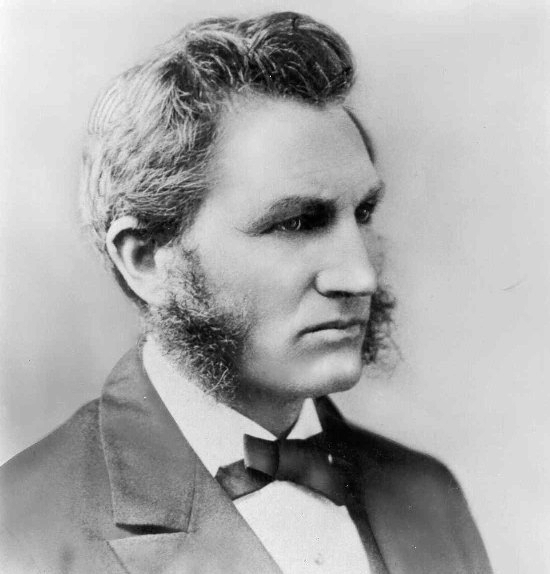
- Lester Ward, age 43
- Born: Lester Frank Ward; June 18, 1841; Joliet, Illinois, U.S.
- Died: April 18, 1913 (aged 71); Washington, D.C., U.S.
- Education: • Susquehanna Collegiate Institute, Towanda, Pennsylvania; • Columbian College; • Brown University
- Occupations: • Geologist; • Sociologist; • professor
- Employers: • U.S. Geological Survey; • Smithsonian Institution; • Brown University
- Known for: Paleobotany, Telesis, sociology, and the introduction of sociology as field of higher education
- Spouse(s): Elizabeth Carolyn Vought (Lizzie); Rosamond Asenath Simons
- Parents: Justus Ward; Silence Rolph Ward

Lester Frank Ward (June 18, 1841 – April 18, 1913) was an American botanist, paleontologist, and sociologist. The first president of the American Sociological Association, James Q. Dealey characterized Ward as a "great pioneer" in the development of American sociology, with contemporaries referring to him as "the Nestor of American sociologists," His 1883 work Dynamic Sociology was influential in establishing sociology as a distinct field in the United States. Despite its initial impact his work was sidelined during the later institutionalization and development of American sociology.

== Biography ==
=== Childhood: 1841–1858 ===
Most, if not all of what is known about Ward's early life comes from the biography, Lester F. Ward: A Personal Sketch, written by Emily Palmer Cape in 1922. Lester Frank Ward was born in Joliet, Illinois. He was the youngest of 10 children born to Justus Ward and his wife Silence Rolph Ward. Justus Ward (d. 1858) was of New England colonial descent and worked on farms in addition to being an itinerant mechanic. Silence Ward was the daughter of a clergyman; she was educated and fond of literature. The family lived in poverty during Ward's early years.

When Ward was one year old, the family moved closer to Chicago, to Cass, now known as Downers Grove, Illinois about twenty-three miles from Lake Michigan. The family then moved to a homestead in nearby St. Charles, Illinois where Ward's father built a saw mill business making railroad ties. As a child, Ward had to worked in farms, mills, and factories to supplement his family income, giving him little time for his education. Ward first attended a formal school at St. Charles, Kane County, Illinois, in 1850 when he was nine years old. He was known as Frank Ward to his classmates and friends and showed a great enthusiasm for books and learning, liberally supplementing his education with outside reading. Four years after Ward started attending school, his parents, along with Lester and an older brother, Erastus, traveled to Iowa in a covered wagon for a new life on the frontier.

=== Starting college: 1858–1862 ===
In 1858, Justus Ward unexpectedly died, and the boys returned the family to the old homestead they still owned in St. Charles. Ward's estranged mother, who lived two miles away with Ward's sister, disapproved of the move, and wanted the boys to stay in Iowa to continue their father's work. The two brothers lived together for a short time in the old family homestead, which they dubbed "Bachelor's Hall;" did farm work to earn a living; and encouraged each other to pursue an education and abandon their father's life of physical labor.

In late 1858, the two brothers moved to Pennsylvania at the invitation of Lester Frank's oldest brother, Cyrenus (nine years Lester Frank's senior), who was starting a business making wagon wheel hubs and needed workers. The brothers saw that as an opportunity to move closer to civilization and eventually attend college.

The business failed, however, and Lester Frank, who still did not have the money to attend college, found a job teaching in a small country school; in the summer months he worked as a farm laborer. He finally saved enough money to attend college and enrolled in the Susquehanna Collegiate Institute in 1860. While he was at first self-conscious about his spotty formal education and self learning, he soon found that his knowledge compared favorably to his classmates', and he was rapidly promoted.

=== Civil War service and further studies: 1862–1873 ===
Ward was a "fervent opponent of slavery" and enlisted in the Union Army to fight in the Civil War in August, 1862. He suffered three gunshot wounds in the Battle of Chancellorsville and was discharged from service on November 18, 1864 due to physical disability. After the war, Ward moved to Washington. In Washington, he worked at the Treasury Department from 1865 until 1872. Ward attended Columbian College, now the George Washington University, and graduating in 1869 with the degree of A.B. In 1871, after he received the degree of LL.B, he was admitted to the Bar of the Supreme Court of the District of Columbia. However, he never practiced law. In 1873, he completed his A.M. degree.

=== Government work and research in Washington, DC ===
Ward and fossil tree trunks

Ward concentrated on his work as a researcher for the federal government. At that time almost all of the basic research in such fields as geography, paleontology, archaeology and anthropology were concentrated in Washington, DC, and a job as a federal government scientist was a prestigious and influential position. From 1881 until 1888, Ward worked at the U.S. Geological Survey (USGS). He started out as an assistant geologist before being promoted in 1883. While he worked there, he became friends with John Wesley Powell, the second director of the USGS (1881–1894) and the director of the Bureau of Ethnology at the Smithsonian Institution. In 1892, he was named Paleontologist for the USGS, a position he held until 1906.

According to Edward Rafferty, Ward was part of a group of "Washington intellectuals" who "wanted to place social science within the structure of government and public life itself." Ward believed that centering research activity in government actions would benefit democratic progress, and evade the partisanship, corruption, and conflict of post-Civil War politics. Broadly, Ward's overarching project represented the "monumental exposition of the relation of the state to social progress." Working from the perspective that social research could be used to improve policy and the function of government, Ward was noted by his contemporaries for engaging in "the most advanced views yet taken by an avowed sociologist in the advocacy of a comprehensive program of social reform through the medium of legislation."

During this time, Ward was very productive in writing and circulating works on his interests concerning nature and society. Ward published his Guide to the flora of Washington and vicinity (1881), followed shortly afterwards by the first volume of Dynamic Sociology: Or applied social science as based upon statistical sociology and the less complex sciences (1883), alongside his Sketch of Paleobotany (1885), Synopsis of the Flora of the Laramie Group (1885), and Types of the Laramie Flora (1887).

=== Gaining notability ===
Reflecting his growing prominence as a scholar and acceptance in academic circles, Ward was elected to the American Philosophical Society in 1889. In 1900, he was elected as the president of International Institute of Sociology in France. Ward was also a fellow of the American Association for the Advancement of Science, and a member of the National Academy of Sciences.

From 1891 to 1905, Ward continued to publish numerous texts on natural history and sociology, with the circulation of his work in both areas contributing to his growing notability. These works included sociological writings on Neo-Darwinism and Neo-Lamarckism (1891), The Psychic Factors of Civilization (1893), multiple articles in Contributions to Social Philosophy (1895–1897), the second volume of his Dynamic Sociology (1897), and his Outlines of Sociology (1898).

=== Founding of American Sociological Association: 1905 ===
In 1905, American sociologists debated the creation of an independent professional association that would be distinct from other existing collectives for historians, economists, and political scientists. C. W. A. Veditz, a professor at George Washington University who admired Ward's work, sought Ward's opinion on the matter, with Ward arguing in favor of an organization that could mirror Paris' International Institute of Sociology.

At a meeting of approximately 300 sociologists at the December 27, 1905 American Economic Association, Ward made a strong argument for the establishment of the American Sociological Association, with the assembled sociologists passing Ward's motion and forming a committee to establish the association's charter and founding officers. Ward became the first president of the American Sociological Association on December 28, 1905 after his colleagues Ross, Small, and Giddings motioned for him to receive the honor. Ward was chosen for the role out of a belief among the committee that "all sociologists are under a heavy debt of gratitude" to his work, and because of Ward's commitment to raise the discipline's profile and esteem in a society where sociology was "not merely discredited, but almost entirely unknown."

=== Teaching at Brown and final years: 1906–1913 ===
After becoming the first president of the American Sociological Association, Ward's reputation and prominence as a sociologist in America was at its peak. In 1906, Ward became chair of sociology at Brown University. Previously, Ward had given "extended courses of lectures on sociology" at the University of Chicago and at Stanford University.

Prior to taking up the position at Brown, Ward and his wife travelled to Europe and Ward took part in various presentations and debates. Ward was popular at Brown, as a teacher and colleague; a fellow professor, Samuel Mitchell, described him as "pre-eminent" among the "many able scholars and teachers" at Brown. One of Ward's students, Sara Algeo, wrote that "studying with Prof. Ward was like sitting at the feet of Aristotle, or Plato ... He was the wisest man I have ever known." In 1910, Ward taught at the University of Wisconsin Madison's sociology department during their summer school.

Ward delivered public lectures and seminars in the United Kingdom and across the United States. Towards the end of his life, Ward critiqued the eugenics movement as founded on a "distrust of nature" and "egotism" and instead argued that a program of social welfare (or 'euthenics') would be far more effective in curing social ills than what was proposed by eugenicists.

Despite gaining recognition for his work and professional esteem, Ward felt increasingly isolated in the later stage of his career, as his focus on systematization was at odds with the work of other social scientists, who were more focused on policy and legislation. During his later years, Ward remained a productive writer. Ward in 1906 published Applied Sociology: A Treatise on the Conscious Improvement of Society by Society and in 1908 an article on Social Classes in the Light of Modern Sociological Theory followed in the American Journal of Sociology. Ward's final major work, Glimpses of the Cosmos, was published posthumously, with the help of Sarah Comstock and Sarah Simons, in six volumes beginning in 1913 and continuing until 1918.

=== Death: 1913 ===
After several weeks of sickness, Ward died on April 17, 1913, at his home on Rhode Island Avenue. Prominent social scientists including Emile Durkheim, Ferdinand Tonnies, Patrick Geddes, Thorstein Veblen, and Albion Small mourned his death. His colleagues at Brown University eulogized Ward as a "profound student, and an original investigator in the most abstruse problems which the human mind can grapple" and described him as "a genial associate" and "an inspiring teacher." In a eulogy in the Washington Herald, C. W. A. Veditz remarked that "his death marks the disappearance of a scientists who will unquestionably rank as one of the half-dozen greatest thinkers in his field that the world has produced."

Ward was first buried at Glenwood Cemetery in Washington but was later moved to Brookside Cemetery, Watertown in Jefferson County, New York to be with his wife. The only surviving public memorial commemorating Ward is in the Pennsylvania village of Myersburg, where a state historical sign describes Ward as "the American Aristotle."

== Personal life ==
=== Marriages ===
While attending the Susquehanna Collegiate Institute, Ward met Elizabeth "Lizzie" Carolyn Vought and fell in love. They married on August 13, 1862. Shortly afterward, he enlisted in the Union Army and was sent to the Civil War front. After the war he successfully petitioned for work with the federal government in Washington, DC, where the couple moved.

Lizzie assisted him in editing and contributing to a newsletter called The Iconoclast, dedicated to free thinking and critiquing organized religion. She gave birth to a son, but the child died when he was less than a year old. Lizzie died in 1872 at the age of thirty. Lester Frank Ward went on to marry Rosamond Asenath Simons (1840–1913) as his second wife in the year 1873.

=== Personal Character ===
Reflecting after Ward's death, his friend James Q. Dealey wrote that Ward "had a deeply emotional nature" which was "suppressed by his close devotion to intellectual pursuits" and that while he was "really fond of social life" he became "so absorbed in his work that ... he lived a lonely life during his last years" and rarely socialized away from his university connections. Dealey described Ward as a committed teacher who "was seldom absent from his classes" and "was most systematic in the preparation of his lectures. " Dealey stated that even towards the end of Ward's life, when "he could barely put one foot before another and could hardly carry the weight of his books," Ward cherished teaching.

Emily Palmer Cape wrote that Ward "always stressed the power of an education which teaches a knowledge of the materials and forces of nature, and their relation to our own lives." Cape noted that Ward "loved nature, and to be out of doors" and enjoyed giving "a long and beautiful description of the earth" whenever possible.

=== Family ===
Ward's immediate family were politically active and involved in various social causes. Lester Ward's older brother, Cyrenus Ward, was "heavily involved in the politics of labor unions and working-class reform" and in the middle of the 1860s he became a leading member of the socialist movement in New York City. Cyrenus Ward went on to join Karl Marx and Friedrich Engels in the International Workingmen's Association, to which he was elected a council member, before being arrested as a spy during the Franco-Prussian War. Lester Ward detailed Cyrenus' activities in The Iconoclast, and went on to secure jobs for him at the Geological Survey and the Bureau of Statistics via his network in Washington. Lester Ward's other brothers, Lorenzo and Justin, were both politically active in the cooperative movement and the prohibitionist movement respectively.

== Works and ideas ==
Ward hoped to use his scientific literacy to contribute an American version of historical-materialist Sociology, opposing the then popular work of Herbert Spencer with critique inspired by Karl Marx. Working in the Enlightenment tradition, Ward associated his project with the advancement of democratic principles in the United States. As Ward explained in the Preface to Dynamic Sociology: Or Applied Social Science as Based Upon Statistical Sociology and the Less Complex Sciences, it was his belief that: "The real object of science is to benefit man. A science which fails to do this, however agreeable its study, is lifeless. Sociology, which of all sciences should benefit man most, is in danger of falling into the class of polite amusements, or dead sciences. It is the object of this work to point out a method by which the breath of life may be breathed into its nostrils."

=== Political beliefs ===
Ward approached society through the lens of producerism, the celebration of productive workers such as artisans, skilled laborers, merchants, and craftspeople, as opposed to nonproducers who simply accumulated capital and resources. Ward believed that government should provide society with understanding of socioeconomic conditions to ensure that the state progressed as a whole. Ward was critical of "privilege, monopoly, and the evils of financial capitalism" and supported abolitionism, temperance, and public education.

=== Nature, evolution and conservation ===
Ward had a lifelong interest in nature, beginning in childhood and extending throughout his time as a government clerk active in local biological societies and as a formally-trained paleobiologist. Ward engaged with Lamarckian ideas, the theory that the natural environment shapes organisms. Ward wrote on the topic in Neo-Darwinism and Neo-Lamarckism and was enthusiastic in his support of Darwin's findings and theories.

Reflecting a popular trend at the time, Ward made connections between evolution, patterns in the natural world, and his perspectives on society. Ward wrote that "the process of evolution is organization," reflecting his opinion that the process is the same across biological, chemical, physical, and social forms of organization. Ward believed that "the universal comprehension of nature" would lead to a situation in which "every human could do his part." He stressed that recognizing that interconnectedness and interdependence "should inspire one to add to the whole" and to "contribute one's share to life's great continuous flow."

Ward understood human conflict and war as evolutionary forces responsible for progress. From Ward's perspective, conflict enabled the rise of Homo sapiens over other creatures and saw the expansion of what he considered to be more technologically advanced races and nations. He saw war as a natural evolutionary process that could be painful, slow, and ineffective. He argued to recognize those characteristics of war but to replace it with a more progressive system, which minimized harm.

He wrote:

Darwin has taught us that the chief barrier to the advance of any species of plants or animals is its competition with other plants and animals that contest the same ground. And therefore the fiercest opponents of any species are the members of the same species which demand the same elements of subsistence. Hence the chief form of relief in the organic world consists in the thinning-out of competitors. Any species of animals or plants left free to propagate at its normal rate would overrun the earth in a short time and leave no room for any other species. Any species that is sufficiently vigorous to resist its organic environment will crowd out all others and monopolize the earth. If nature permitted this there could be no variety, but only one monotonous aspect devoid of interest or beauty. Whatever we may think of the harsh method by which this is prevented, we cannot regret that it is prevented, and that we have a world of variety, interest, and aesthetic attractiveness.

Alongside George Perkins Marsh, John Wesley Powell, and W. J. McGee, Ward's ideas concerning conservation and the management of natural resources informed the conservation movement of the early 20th century. The extent of Ward's contributions to scientific understanding of nature has been debated. John Burnham wrote, "Ward's unbelievable egotism and his ostentatious display of technical terminology misled many writers into believing he was a "great" or "distinguished" natural scientist." Ward's desire to "prove his knowledge of all scientific subjects" and his "habit of creating difficult neologisms in his books" proved to be "particularly bothersome to many readers of his work."

=== Welfare state and laissez faire ===
Ward was a supporter of the concept of the welfare state. He argued that those critical of the development of a social safety as 'paternalistic' were hypocritical since they received "relief from their own incompetency" in their private enterprise as capitalists and industrialists. Ward's ideas influenced a rising generation of progressive political leaders, such as Herbert Croly, and his ideas came to help shape early welfare policy in the United States. However, there are few demonstrable direct links between his writings and the actual programs of the founders of the welfare state and the New Deal.

Reflecting his overarching engagement with discussions of evolution, Ward critiqued Herbert Spencer and Spencer's theories of laissez-faire and survival of the fittest, which were popular in socio-economic thought in the United States after the American Civil War. Ward positioned himself in opposition to Spencer and the American political scientist William Graham Sumner, an advocate for Spencer's ideas, who had promoted the principles of laissez-faire. The historian Henry Steele Commager argued that Ward "trained his heaviest guns" on "the superstitions that still held domain over the mid of his generation" of which "laissez-faire was the most stupefying."

=== Women's equality ===
Ward advocated for equal rights for women and at times drew on metaphors and analogies from his interest in the study of the natural world to support his arguments. He gave a speech on the topic to the Fourteenth Dinner of the Six O’clock Club in Washington on April 26, 1888, at Willard's Hotel. Ward was of the opinion that "there is no fixed rule by which Nature has intended that one sex should excel the other, any more than there is any fixed point beyond which either cannot develop." Ward summarized his position as "true science teaches that the elevation of woman is the only sure road to the evolution of man." Despite Ward's interest in the topic of equal rights for women, Clifford H. Scott summarised that "practically all the suffragists ignored" Ward.

== Legacy in American sociology ==
As Robert Kessler summarized, "reputation came slowly and faded rapidly" for Ward; while his early work was "epoch-making" and his impact led to Hofstadter naming him the "American Aristotle," by the mid-20th century Ward, had "passed so completely from the contemporary scene" and is now largely undiscussed in modern American sociology. Eric Royal Lybeck argues that the broadness of Ward's research was responsible for his work being "shunted from the centre of sociological discourse to the margins of posterity."

Ward's work was wide sweeping and attempted to synthesize insights from a broad spectrum of research themes and subjects, but the institutionalization of sociology in the United States led to a hyperfocus on discrete and specialized problems which was at odds with the scale of his approach. Albion Small suggested that Ward remained too attached to the positivism of Auguste Comte and the evolutionism of Herbert Spencer while other social scientists were moving towards other social models and methods of analysis. It was Small's assessment that Ward clung to a "pure science" approach in social research, and was more of a "museum investigator" interested in labeling, categorising, and developing schema. Cumulatively, while Ward was "highly regarded and influential" in the early history of sociology in the United States, his approach and contributions rapidly became redundant as the field changed.

Even during his lifetime, C. W. A. Veditz suggested that due to translation and wide circulation, Ward's works may have been better known in Germany, France, Switzerland, Russia, and Japan than they were in the United States.

== Ward's diaries, writings, and photographs ==
All but the first of his voluminous diaries were reportedly destroyed by Rosamond after his death. Ward's first journal, Young Ward's Diary: A Human and Eager Record of the Years Between 1860 and 1870..., remains under copyright. A collection of Ward's writings and photographs is maintained by the Special Collections Research Center of the George Washington University. The collection includes articles, diaries, correspondence, and a scrapbook. GWU's Special Collections Research Center is located in the Estelle and Melvin Gelman Library.

== Literature ==
- Becker, Ernest (1975). Escape From Evil. New York / London: Free Press / Collier MacMillan. OCLC 780436838 (all editions).
- John Chynoweth Burnham (1956). Lester Frank Ward in American thought. Annals of American sociology. Washington, D.C.: Public Affairs Press. ISBN 978-0742522176.
- Samuel Chugerman (1939). Lester F. Ward, the American Aristotle: A Summary and Interpretation of His Sociology. Literary Licensing, LLC. ISBN 978-1-258-10598-3.
- Chriss, James J. (2006). "The Place of Lester Ward among the Sociological Classics". Journal of Classical Sociology. 6 (1): 5–21. doi:10.1177/1468795X06061282. S2CID 145704932.
- Commager, Henry Steele (1950). "Lester Ward and the Science of Society". The American Mind: An Interpretation of American Thought and Character Since the 1880s. Yale University Press. ISBN 978-0-300-00046-7.
- Commager, Henry Steele, ed. (1967). Lester Ward and the Welfare State. New York: Bobbs-Merrill. OCLC 906058006 (all editions).
- Coser, Lewis. A History of Sociological Analysis. New York : Basic Books.
- Dahms, Harry F. – 'Lester F. Ward'
- Finlay, Barbara. "Lester Frank Ward as a Sociologist Of Gender: A New Look at His Sociological Work." Gender & Society, Vol. 13, No. 2, 251–265 (1999)
- Gossett, Thomas F. (1963). Race: The History of an Idea in America.
- Harp, Gillis J. Positivist Republic, Ch. 5 "Lester F. Ward: Positivist Whig" Positivist Republic: Auguste Comte and the Reconstruction of American Liberalism, 1865–1920
- Hofstadter, Richard. Social Darwinism in American Thought, Chapter 4, (original 1944, 1955. reprint Boston: Beacon Press, 1992). Social Darwinism in American Thought
- Largey, Gale. Lester Ward: A Global Sociologist
- Mers, Adelheid. Fusion
- Perlstadt, Harry. Applied Sociology as Translational Research: A One Hundred Fifty Year Voyage
- Rafferty, Edward C. Apostle of Human Progress. Lester Frank Ward and American Political Thought, 1841/1913. Apostle of Human Progress: Lester Frank Ward and American Political Thought, 1841–1913
- Ravitch, Diane. Left Back: A Century of Failed School Reforms. Simon & Schuster. "Chapter one: The Educational Ladder" Left Back
- Ross, John R. Man over Nature: the origins of the conservation movement
- Ross, Dorthy. The Origins of American Social Science. Cambridge University Press The Origins of American Social Science
- Seidelman, Raymond and Harpham, Edward J. Disenchanted Realists: Political Science and the American Crisis, 1884–1984. p. 26 Disenchanted Realists: Political Science and the American Crisis
- Wood, Clement. The Sociology Of Lester F Ward The Sociology Of Lester F Ward

== Selected works ==
=== 1880–1889 ===
- Ward, Lester F. (1881). "Guide to the flora of Washington and vicinity". Department of the Interior: U.S. National Museum – Bulletin of the United States National Museum. 26 (22). Washington: Washington Printing Office. OCLC 504513602 (all editions).
- —— (1883). Dynamic Sociology (Vol. 1). Or Applied social science as based upon statical sociology and the less complex sciences. Vol. 1 of 2. New York: D. Appleton & Co.
- —— (1885). "Sketch of Paleobotany". Department of the Interior: U.S. National Museum – Extract from the Fifth Annual Report of the Director, 1883–'84. Washington: Washington Printing Office: 357. Bibcode:1885usgs.rept....7W. doi:10.3133/70159114.
- —— (1885). "Synopsis of the Flora of the Laramie Group". Annual Report of the U.S. Geological Survey. 6. Chicago: U.S. Geological Survey: 399–557.
- —— (1887). "Types of the Laramie Flora". Department of the Interior: U.S. National Museum – Bulletin of the United States National Museum (37). Washington: Washington Printing Office: 363–469.

=== 1890–1899 ===
- Ward, Lester F. (1891). Neo-Darwinism and Neo-Lamarckism. Washington: Gedney & Roberts Co.
- Ward, Lester F. (1893). The Psychic Factors of Civilization. Boston: Ginn & Co. (reprinted 1906)
- Ward, Lester F. (1895). Contributions to Social Philosophy. II. Sociology and Cosmology. Vol. 1. Chicago: American Journal of Sociology. pp. 132–145.
- Ward, Lester F. (1895). Contributions to Social Philosophy. III. Sociology and Biology. Vol. 1. Chicago: American Journal of Sociology. pp. 313–326.
- Ward, Lester F. (1895). Contributions to Social Philosophy. IV. Sociology and Anthropology. Vol. 1. Chicago: American Journal of Sociology. pp. 426–433.
- Ward, Lester F. (1896). Contributions to Social Philosophy. V. Sociology and Psychology. Vol. 1. Chicago: American Journal of Sociology. pp. 618–632.
- Ward, Lester F. (1896). Contributions to Social Philosophy. VI. The Data of Sociology. Vol. 1. Chicago: American Journal of Sociology. pp. 738–752.
- Ward, Lester F. (1896). Contributions to Social Philosophy. VII. The Social Forces. Vol. 2. Chicago: American Journal of Sociology. pp. 82–95.
- Ward, Lester F. (1896). Contributions to Social Philosophy. VIII. The Mechanics of Society. Vol. 2. Chicago: American Journal of Sociology. pp. 234–254.
- Ward, Lester F. (1896). Contributions to Social Philosophy. IX. The Purpose of Sociology. Vol. 2. Chicago: American Journal of Sociology. pp. 446–460.
- Ward, Lester F. (1897). Contributions to Social Philosophy. X. Social Genesis. Vol. 2. Chicago: American Journal of Sociology. pp. 532–546.
- Ward, Lester F. (1897). Contributions to Social Philosophy. XI. Individual Telesis. Vol. 2. Chicago: American Journal of Sociology. pp. 699–717.
- Ward, Lester F. (1897). Contributions to Social Philosophy. XII. Collective Telesis. Vol. 2. Chicago: American Journal of Sociology. pp. 801–822.
- Ward, Lester F. (1897). Dynamic Sociology (Vol. 2). Or Applied social science as based upon statical sociology and the less complex sciences. Vol. 2 of 2. New York: D. Appleton & Co.
- Ward, Lester F. (1898). Outlines of Sociology. London: The Macmillan Co. (reprinted 1913)

=== 1900–1909 ===
- Ward, Lester F.Ward (January 1902). "Contemporary Sociology, I–IV (Part 1 of 3)". American Journal of Sociology. 7 (4). Chicago: University of Chicago Press.
- Ward, Lester F. (March 1902). "Contemporary Sociology, V–VIII (Part 2 of 3)". American Journal of Sociology. 7 (5). Chicago: University of Chicago Press: 629–658. doi:10.1086/211087.
- Ward, Lester F. (May 1902). Contemporary Sociology, IX–XII (Part 3 of 3). American Journal of Sociology. Vol. 7. Chicago: University of Chicago Press. pp. 749–762.
- Ward, Lester F. (1903) "Pure Sociology: A Treatise on the Origin and Spontaneous Development of Society." (2,625 KB – PDF)
- Ward, Lester F. (1905). "Status of the Mesozoic floras of the United States, Vol. 1". Monographs of the U.S. Geological Survey. 48 (Part 1 – Text). Washington: Washington Printing Office: 5–616. With the collaboration of William M. Fontaine, Arthur Bibbins, and G. R. Wieland
- Ward, Lester F. (1905). "Status of the Mesozoic floras of the United States, Vol. 2". Monographs of the U.S. Geological Survey. 48 (Part 2 – Plates). Washington: Washington Printing Office: ~500pp. With the collaboration of William M. Fontaine, Arthur Bibbins, and G. R. Wieland
- Dealey, James Q.; Ward, Lester F. (1905). A Text-Book of Sociology. London: The Macmillan Co.
- Ward, Lester F. (1906). Applied Sociology. A Treatise on the Conscious Improvement of Society by Society. New York: Ginn & Co.
- Ward, Lester F. (1908). Social Classes in the Light of Modern Sociological Theory. Vol. 13. Chicago: American Journal of Sociology. pp. 617–627.

=== 1910–1919 ===
- Ward, Lester F. (1913). Eugenics, Euthenics, and Eudemics. Chicago: American Journal of Sociology. pp. 737–754.
- Ward, Lester F. (1913–1918). Glimpses of the Cosmos, Vol. 1. Vol. 6 vols. New York and London: G. P. Putnam's Sons.
- Ward, Lester F. (1913–1918). Glimpses of the Cosmos, Vol. 2. Vol. 6 vols. New York and London: G. P. Putnam's Sons.
- Ward, Lester F. (1913–1918). Glimpses of the Cosmos, Vol. 3. Vol. 6 vols. New York and London: G. P. Putnam's Sons.
- Ward, Lester F. (1913–1918). Glimpses of the Cosmos, Vol. 4. Vol. 6 vols. New York and London: G. P. Putnam's Sons.
- Ward, Lester F. (1913–1918). Glimpses of the Cosmos, Vol. 5. Vol. 6 vols. New York and London: G. P. Putnam's Sons.
- Ward, Lester F. (1913–1918). Glimpses of the Cosmos, Vol. 6. Vol. 6 vols. New York and London: G. P. Putnam's Sons.
