= Sweet Taste of Liberty =

Sweet Taste of Liberty may refer to:

- Sweet Taste of Liberty: A True Story of Slavery and Restitution in America, a book by W. Caleb McDaniel
- "Sweet Taste of Liberty", an episode from season 1 of How I Met Your Mother
