= Drechsler =

Drechsler is a German surname, literally meaning "woodturner" or "lathe operator". Notable people with the surname include:

- Charles Drechsler (1892–1986), American mycologist
- Clara Drechsler (born 1961), German author and translator
- Dave Drechsler (born 1960), American football player
- Debbie Drechsler (born 1953), American illustrator and comic book creator
- Hanno Drechsler (1931–2003), German political scientist
- Heike Drechsler (born 1964), German athlete
- Joseph Drechsler (1782–1852), Austrian organist, composer and conductor
- Karl Drechsler (1800–1873), German cellist
- Margot Dreschel (1908–1945), SS-Aufseherin at Nazi German concentration camps
- Otto-Heinrich Drechsler (1895–1945), German dentist, mayor of Lübeck, General Commissioner of Latvia for the Nazi occupation regime
- Paul Drechsler (born 1956), Irish businessman
- Werner Drechsler (1923–1944), German U-boat crewman
- Wolfgang Drechsler (born 1963), German member of the Order of Merit

== See also ==
- Drexler
- Trexler (disambiguation)
- Turner
