= Draxler =

Draxler is a surname. Notable people with the surname include:

- Jack Draxler, American politician
- Jesse Draxler (born 1983), American visual artist
- Judith Draxler (born 1970), Austrian retired freestyle swimmer
- Julian Draxler (born 1993), German footballer
- Ludwig Draxler (1896–1972), Austrian attorney and politician
