= Emily Palmer Cape =

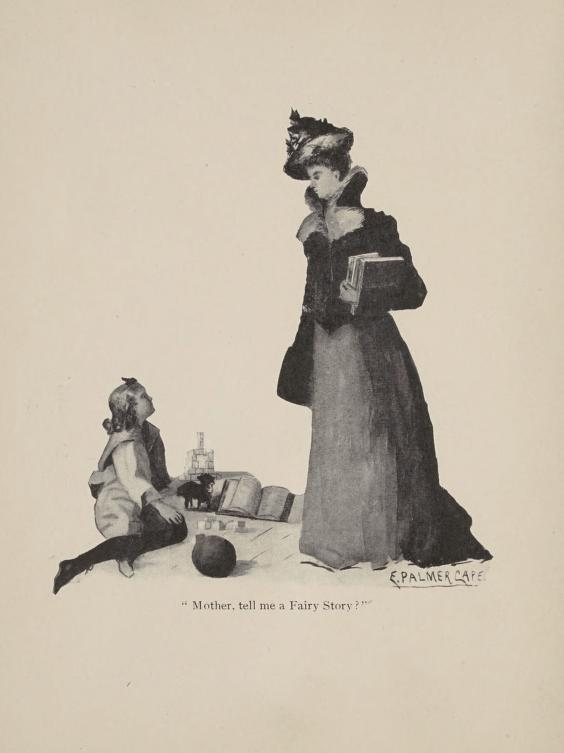
Illustration from Emily Palmer Cape's Fairy Surprises for Little People (1908)

Emily Palmer Cape (1865–1953) was an artist, writer, sociologist and freethinker, and the first woman admitted to Columbia University. She became a close friend and editorial assistant to Lester Frank Ward, as well as writing a number of her own works. Cape was described as 'an agnostic and an ardent humanitarian'.

== Life ==
Emily Palmer Cape (née Palmer) was born in New York City in 1865. In 1884, she enrolled at Columbia University (then Columbia College), answering a call from the university's president Frederick Augustus Porter Barnard for applications from women. Due to prejudice against their studying at the university, she was not allowed to attend lectures, and had to undertake laboratory work at night at the College of Pharmacy. She graduated in 1887. In 1890, she married Henry Cape, a lumber merchant, and had two children: Henry Cape, Jr. and Mary Story Cape.

After hearing a lecture by the sociologist Lester F. Ward, Cape visited him and proposed that she assist him in preparing a compilation of his works. Ward drew the admiration of many women, including Charlotte Perkins Gilman, particularly drawn to his 'free thought and women's rights views'. Becoming an intimate friend and devotee of Ward, Cape co-edited, with him, a multi-volume collection of Ward's writings entitled Glimpses of the Cosmos. She also became Ward's literary executor on his death in 1913, and in 1922 published a memoir of him. In it, she described Ward as having 'the mind of a sage, the heart of a woman, and the soul of a poet.'

A talented artist, Cape was a member of the National Association of Women Painters and Sculptors, studying at the National Academy of Design as well as under various individual artists. As a supporter of women's suffrage, Cape was a member of the Equal Franchise Society and the Political Equality Society. A freethinker, she was a member of rationalist and positivist societies in London.

Emily Palmer Cape died on 27 December 1953 at home in Sarasota, Florida.
