= Frank Furstenberg =

American sociologist (born 1940)

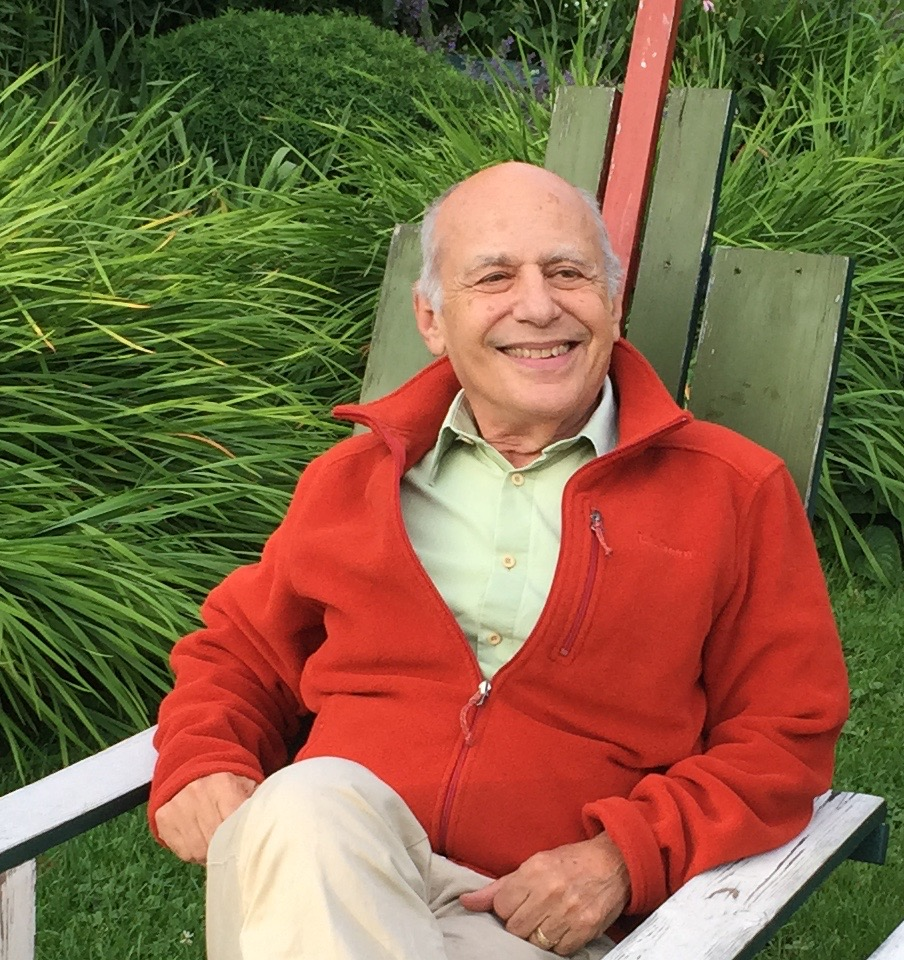
- Frank F. Furstenberg, in July 2015
- Born: Frank Folke Furstenberg Jr. August 25, 1940 (age 86); Baltimore, MD

Academic background
- Education: Haverford College (B.A. 1961) and Columbia University (PhD 1967)

Academic work
- Institutions: University of Pennsylvania (1967–2009)
- Main interests: Sociology

Frank Folke Furstenberg Jr. (born August 25, 1940) is an American sociologist. He is the Zellerbach Family Professor of Sociology, Emeritus, and a research associate in the Population Studies Center at the University of Pennsylvania. His research focuses on the family in the context of disadvantaged urban neighborhoods, adolescent sexual behavior, and the transition from adolescence to adulthood. He has written on social change, divorce, remarriage, stepfamilies, grandparenthood, intergenerational relations, and cross-national research on children's well-being. He has been cited more than 22,000 times and is a prominent family sociologists in the United States. He is an elected member of the National Academy of Medicine, the American Academy of Arts and Sciences, and the American Academy of Political and Social Science.

== Early life and education ==
Furstenberg was born on August 25, 1940, in Baltimore, Maryland, into an established Jewish family descended from aristocratic German Jews. His father, Frank Furstenberg Sr., was a prominent physician and advocate for national health care and his mother, Edith Hollander Furstenberg, was a social worker and family matriarch. His siblings include the late founding owner of Politics and Prose, Carla Furstenberg Cohen, and the baker Mark Furstenberg.

Furstenberg received a Bachelor of Arts degree from Haverford College in 1961 and a Ph.D. degree in sociology from Columbia University in 1967. At Columbia, he researched teenage pregnancy and poverty following inspiration from his mother, Edith.

== Career ==
Furstenberg joined the University of Pennsylvania sociology department as a professor in 1967. He rose in rank to the named chair, the Zellerbach Family Professorship, where he remained until his retirement in 2009. In total, Furstenberg drew on 42 years of teaching experience at Penn. Alongside his professorship, he also served as a Research Associate in the Population Studies Center at the University of Pennsylvania. Penn TodayUniversity of Pennsylvania - School of Arts & Sciences.

He was a visiting fellow at the Center for Advanced Study in the Behavioral Sciences, the Russell Sage Foundation, the London School of Economics and Political Science, the National University of Singapore, and Bocconi University.

Furstenberg served as Chair of the MacArthur Foundation Research Network on the Transition to Adulthood. In this capacity, he received a four-year, $5.2 million grant from The John D. and Catherine T. MacArthur Foundation in support of the Research Network on Transitions to Adulthood. The Network, established in 2000, examines the changing nature of early adulthood and the challenges facing people aged 18 to 34 as they make the transition to becoming self-sufficient adults.

Furstenberg is an elected member of the National Academy of Medicine (1996), an elected member of the American Academy of Arts and Sciences (1994), and Margaret Mead Fellow of the American Academy of Political and Social Science (2002). His honors include fellowships from the John Simon Guggenheim Memorial Foundation (1982), the Russell Sage Foundation, and the Woodrow Wilson National Fellowship Foundation.

In his 2013 autobiographical essay “How I Became a Developmentalist,” published in The Developmental Science of Adolescence: History Through Autobiography (Psychology Press), Furstenberg reflected on how his longitudinal research led him from sociology to developmental science. He argued that individual preferences are shaped by social interactions and the contexts in which they occur, a perspective that informed his research on families, adolescence, and the transition to adulthood throughout his career.

== Research ==
=== Teenage childbearing and the Baltimore Study ===
Furstenberg's research on teenage childbearing included a 20-year longitudinal study of teenage mothers and their children in Baltimore, one of the longest-running investigations of its kind. In Destinies of the Disadvantaged, he argued that public understanding of teen pregnancy has often been shaped by flawed research and political rhetoric, despite declining overall teen pregnancy rates during the 1960s and 1970s.

=== Transition to adulthood ===
Furstenberg's research showed that young people today are transitioning to adulthood later in life than they were in the 1960s and 70s, examining the causes of this change and its implications for young adults, families, and the larger society. His edited volume On the Frontiers of Adulthood (2005), co-edited with Richard A. Settersten Jr. and Rubén G. Rumbaut, explored this extended period between adolescence and full adulthood in depth.

=== Divorce, stepfamilies, and grandparenthood ===
In collaboration with Andrew J. Cherlin, he co-authored Divided Families: What Happens to Children When Parents Part (1991), which became a widely cited text on the effects of parental divorce. Together with Cherlin, he also investigated stepfamilies in the United States, publishing a reconsideration of that literature in the Annual Review of Sociology in 1994.

Furstenberg and Cherlin jointly studied grandparenthood, producing the landmark book The New American Grandparent (1986). Their 1985 study examined the grandparenting relationship along two variables, the exchange of services across generations and the degree of parental influence exerted by grandparents and identified five distinct grandparenting styles: detached, passive, authoritative, supportive, and influential.

=== Urban families and neighborhood effects ===
Furstenberg's longitudinal research followed nearly 500 families in urban Philadelphia neighborhoods over a nine-year span. Earlier findings from this project revealed continuity in success trajectories from early to mid-adolescence despite hazards imposed by poor neighborhoods, low economic standing, and poor schooling opportunities.

=== Family change and cross-national research ===
In later work, Furstenberg examined long-term changes in family life in the United States and globally. He argued that the decline of traditional gender roles and rising social inequality contributed to increasing diversity in family forms. His comparative research, drawing on data from more than 80 countries, explored how family systems are changing across the world. He also revisited the study of kinship, highlighting its relative neglect in recent scholarship and calling for greater attention to how kinship ties are formed and maintained in contemporary societies.

== Awards and honors ==
- Elected member of the National Academy of Medicine (1996)
- Elected Fellow of the American Academy of Arts and Sciences (1994)
- Named Margaret Mead Fellow by the American Academy of Political and Social Science (2002)
- Recipient of a John Simon Guggenheim Memorial Foundation Fellowship (1982)
- Awarded fellowships from the Russell Sage Foundation and the Woodrow Wilson National Fellowship Foundation
- Recipient of the John P. Hill Memorial Award from the Society for Research on Adolescence (2004)
- Recipient of the Award for Distinguished Scholarship from the American Sociological Association Section on the Family

== Publications ==
- Unplanned parenthood: The social consequences of teenage childbearing, 1976. The Free Press
- Teenage sexuality, pregnancy, and childbearing, edited with Richard Lincoln and Jane Menken, 1981. University of Pennsylvania Press
- Adolescent mothers in later life, with J. Brooks-Gunn and S. Philip Morgan. 1987. New York: Cambridge University Press
- Managing to make it: Urban families in high-risk neighborhoods, with Thomas Cook, Jacquelynne Eccles, Glen H. Elder Jr., and Arnold Sameroff. 1999. Chicago: University of Chicago Press
- On the frontiers of adulthood: Theory, research, and public policy, edited with Richard A. Settersten Jr. and Rubén G. Rumbaut. 2005. University of Chicago Press
- Destinies of the Disadvantaged: The Politics of Teenage Childbearing, 2007. Russell Sage Foundation
- The new American grandparent: A place in the family, a life apart, with Andrew J. Cherlin, 1986. Basic Books
- Divided Families: What Happens to Children when Parents Part, with Andrew J. Cherlin, 1991. Harvard University Press.
- Behind the academic curtain: How to find success and happiness with a Ph.D. (2013. University of Chicago Press)
- “How I Became a Developmentalist.” In Richard Lerner, Anne Petersen, Rainer Silbereisen, and Jeanne Brooks-Gunn (Eds.), The Developmental Science of Adolescence: History Through Autobiography, pp. 184–191. 2013. Psychology Press
- “Family Change in Global Perspective: How and Why Family Systems Change.” Family Relations, 68: 326–341. 2019
- “Kinship Reconsidered: Research on a Neglected Topic.” Journal of Marriage and Family, 82(1): 364–382. 2020

== Personal life ==
Furstenberg is married to Nina Segre. Together they have five children and six grandchildren and live in Philadelphia. His nephew, François Furstenberg, is a historian at Johns Hopkins University.
