= Val Potter =

American politician (born 1958)

Member of the Utah House of Representatives from the 3rd district
- In office January 1, 2017 – December 31, 2020
- Preceded by: Jack Draxler

Personal details
- Born: July 23, 1958 (age 68) North Logan, Utah, U.S.
- Party: Republican

Val Potter (born July 23, 1958) is an American politician who served in the Utah House of Representatives from the 3rd district from 2017 to 2020.

== Tenure ==
A former mayor and county councilman, Potter serves on the House Political Subdivisions Committee and the House Transportation Committee. In addition, as an administrator at Utah State University, Potter joins Representative Karen Kwan as the only members of the Higher Education Appropriations Subcommittee with professional experience in higher education.
