= François Furstenberg =

Canadian and American historian

Academic background
- Education: Columbia University (BA 1994); Johns Hopkins University (PhD 2003)
- Doctoral advisor: Dorothy Ross

Academic work
- Discipline: American history
- Institutions: Université de Montréal (2003–2014); Johns Hopkins University (2014–)

François Furstenberg is a Canadian and American historian. He taught at the Université de Montréal and currently teaches at Johns Hopkins University. He is known for his work on North American history around the time of the American Revolution, particularly on George Washington and slavery and on French émigrés to North America.

== Early life and education ==
Furstenberg was born in Washington, D.C., and grew up in Boston, Massachusetts, and Washington. His grandmother, Edith H. Furstenberg, was a social worker and daughter of Sidney Hollander, a pharmacist who invented the Rem cough medicine and became a philanthropist. She married prominent Baltimore physician Frank F. Furstenberg and advocated for national health care legislation. His father, Mark Furstenberg, is a baker who runs the Bread Furst bakery and won a James Beard Foundation Award in 2017. His uncle is the University of Pennsylvania sociologist Frank Furstenberg and his aunt, Carla Furstenberg Cohen, founded and owned the Chevy Chase bookstore Politics and Prose.

Furstenberg received his B.A. from Columbia University (1994) and his Ph.D. from Johns Hopkins University (2003), where he was advised by Dorothy Ross.

== Career ==
Furstenberg has taught at the Université de Montréal (2003–2014) and currently teaches at Johns Hopkins University (2014–), where he has also served as director of undergraduate studies.

His research focuses on the history of the United States and the Atlantic World in the eighteenth and nineteenth centuries. He has written about George Washington and the history of slavery in the United States, in In the Name of the Father: Washington’s Legacy, Slavery, and the Making of a Nation (2006), and the history of French émigrés in the United States in When the United States Spoke French: Five Refugees who Shaped a Nation (2014). In the course of writing the second, he was a fellow of the New York Public Library's Cullman Center 2009–2010.

He was a historical consultant for the American Revolution-themed video game Assassin's Creed III 2010–2012.

Furstenberg was elected a member of the American Antiquarian Society in 2013, and he is a distinguished lecturer for the Organization of American Historians.

== Works ==
- In the Name of the Father: Washington’s Legacy, Slavery, and the Making of a Nation (2006)
- When the United States Spoke French: Five Refugees who Shaped a Nation (2014)
