= Henrietta Wood =

American enslaved woman

- Born: Between 1818 and 1820; Kentucky, U.S.
- Died: 1912; Chicago, Illinois, U.S.
- Known for: Largest verdict awarded for slavery reparations in the United States
- Children: 1 son

Henrietta Wood (c. 1819 – 1912) was an American woman held as a slave who won the largest verdict ever awarded for slavery reparations in the United States. Born as a slave in Kentucky, but freed as an adult, Wood was later kidnapped and sold back into slavery. After the American Civil War, Wood successfully sued her kidnapper and won financial damages.

== Biography ==
Wood was born into slavery with the Tousey family on a farm in northern Kentucky sometime between 1818 and 1820. Moses Tousey died in 1834, and Wood was sold to Louisville merchant Henry Forsyth for $700, (~$22,575 in 2025) for whom she did housework. She was sold again to another Louisville merchant, William Cirode, who was a French immigrant. Cirode took her to New Orleans. After Cirode returned to France in 1844, his wife, Jane Cirode, brought Wood to Cincinnati in Ohio, a free state. Jane Cirode registered Wood as free in 1848. In the following years a free woman, Wood was a domestic worker in the Cincinnati area.

In 1853, William Cirode's daughter and son-in-law, Josephine and Robert White, wanted to profit by recapturing Wood. They hired Zebulon Ward, a deputy sheriff in Covington, Kentucky, to kidnap Wood and sell her. Ward conspired with Wood's employer to bring Wood to the Kentucky side of the Ohio River, where they captured her. She was then held in a slave pen in Lexington, Kentucky for a year. Under the terms of the Fugitive Slave Act of 1850, Wood was not entitled to a trial or to testify on her own behalf. However, a sympathetic innkeeper whom Wood had encountered in Kentucky filed a lawsuit on her behalf. The lawsuit took two years, but was unsuccessful because it was not possible to produce papers in Kentucky proving that Wood was free; they had been burned in a courthouse fire in Cincinnati in 1849.

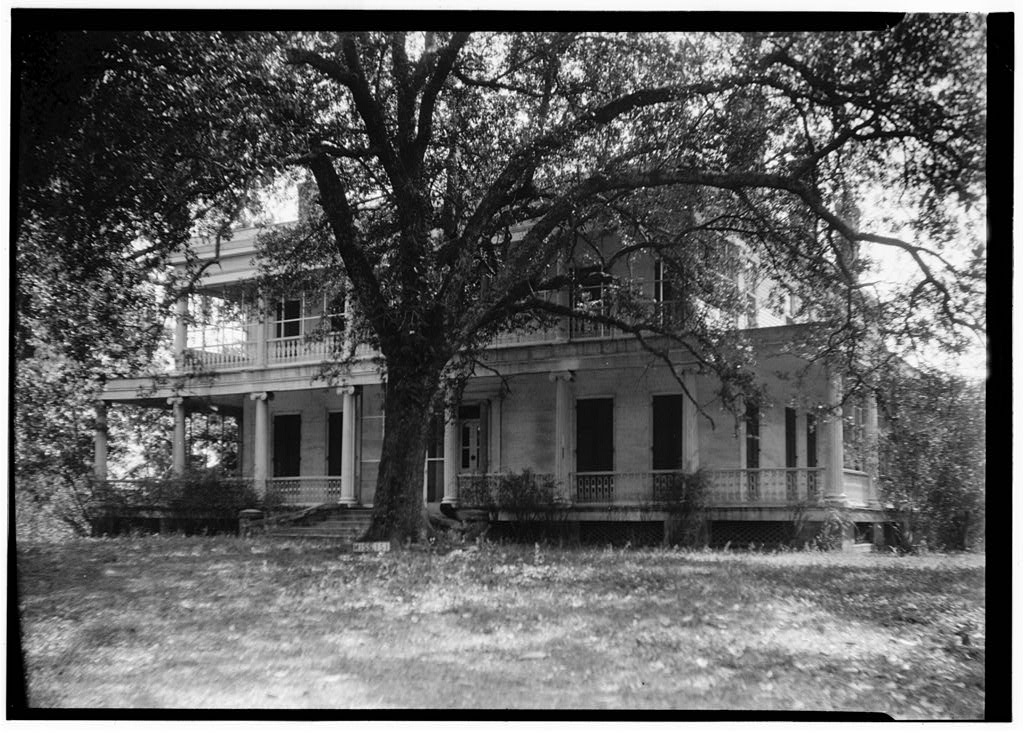
Wood was enslaved at Brandon Hall in Mississippi

With the lawsuit over, Wood was taken in 1855 to Natchez, Mississippi, where she was sold to Gerard Brandon, the son of the former Mississippi governor of the same name. Wood worked in cruel conditions in the cotton fields and in the home on Brandon's plantations, and gave birth to her son, Arthur. At the end of the Civil War, when the Union Army arrived to liberate slaves in the area, Brandon marched his slaves to Texas to escape. Wood remained enslaved to him until 1869, when she was finally freed by signing an employment contract with the Brandon family. She soon returned to the Cincinnati area with her son.

== Reparations trial ==
In 1870, Wood began the litigation process to sue Zebulon Ward in federal court in Cincinnati. The trial, Wood v. Ward, took place in 1878, presided over by Judge Philip Swing. Wood and her lawyer, Harvey Myers, asked for $20,000 in restitution, and the jury awarded her $2,500, which she received in 1879. The amount is equal to $65,000 in 2019 dollars, and remains the largest award ever given for slavery reparations. Her case was championed by Lafcadio Hearn of The Cincinnati Commercial.

== Later life and legacy ==
Following the trial, Wood moved to Chicago to be with her son, Arthur H. Simms. She used the restitution to help pay for him to attend Union College of Law, now Northwestern University Pritzker School of Law. Arthur had a long career as a lawyer in Chicago during the first half of the 20th century.

Wood's successful trial did not begin a trend of similar reparations cases, and though it received national press coverage at the time, was largely forgotten in the following years. In 2019, W. Caleb McDaniel, a professor of history at Rice University, used court records and archives to research and publish a book about Wood's life called Sweet Taste of Liberty: A True Story of Slavery and Restitution. The book was awarded the 2020 Pulitzer Prize for history.
