= W. Caleb McDaniel =

American historian (born 1979)

- Born: William Caleb McDaniel; August 2, 1979 (age 47); Texas, USA
- Spouse: Brandy McDaniel
- Awards: 2020 Pulitzer Prize for History; 2014 Merle Curti Award

Academic background
- Education: Texas A&M University (BA, MA); Johns Hopkins University (PhD)
- Thesis: Our Country is the World: Radical American Abolitionists Abroad. (2006)
- Academic advisor: Dorothy Ross

Academic work
- Institutions: Rice University; University of Denver
- Notable works: Sweet Taste of Liberty
- Website: wcaleb.org

William Caleb McDaniel (born August 2, 1979) is an American historian. His book Sweet Taste of Liberty: A True Story of Slavery and Restitution in America won the 2020 Pulitzer Prize for History. He is also an associate professor of history at Rice University.

== Early life and education ==
McDaniel was born on August 2, 1979. He attended Texas A&M University for his undergraduate degree and master's degree after being offered a President's Endowed Scholarship. After earning his degrees, he enrolled at Johns Hopkins University for his PhD, which he received in 2006. While at Johns Hopkins, he listed historian Dorothy Ross as one of his mentors.

== Career ==
Upon earning his PhD, McDaniel accepted an assistant professor of history position at the University of Denver before moving to Rice University. In his early years at Rice, he published Repealing Unions: American Abolitionists, Irish Repeal, and the Origins of Garrisonian Disunionism in the Journal of the Early Republic, which received the 2008 Ralph D. Gray Article Prize.

In 2013, McDaniel won the Society for Historians of the Early American Republic James H. Broussard First Book Prize and the Organization of American Historians Merle Curti Award for his book The Problem of Democracy in the Age of Slavery: Garrisonian Abolitionists and Transatlantic Reform. His book focused on the rise of William Lloyd Garrison, an abolitionist, and his network of connections across the Atlantic. Following his first publication, McDaniel sat as a board member for Historians Against Slavery and received the Rice University 2017 George R. Brown Award for Superior Teaching. He was also granted a National Endowment for the Humanities (NEH) grant to research Henrietta Wood, a former slave.

McDaniel's second book, Sweet Taste of Liberty: A True Story of Slavery and Restitution in America, was published in 2019 and was a historical account of the life of Henrietta Wood. Wood was captured and enslaved twice before winning the largest known financial settlement awarded by a U.S. court in restitution for slavery. He had first learned about Wood from another historian while working on a research project. It received the 2020 Pulitzer Prize for History, making him the first Rice professor to win a Pulitzer, and the Organization of American Historians Avery O. Craven Award for "the most original book on the coming of the Civil War, the Civil War years, or the Era of Reconstruction, with the exception of works of purely military history."
