= The Origins of American Social Science =

1991 book

- Title page for The Origins of American Social Science (1991)
- Author: Dorothy Ross
- Subject: History of social science
- Publisher: Cambridge University Press
- Publication date: 1991
- Pages: 508

The Origins of American Social Science is a 1991 book by Dorothy Ross on the early history of social science in the United States.

== Bibliography ==
- Aspinwall, Bernard (1992). "Review of The Origins of American Social Science". History. 77 (251): 454–455. ISSN 0018-2648. JSTOR 24422103.
- Barber, William J. (1992). "Review of The Origins of American Social Science". Journal of Economic Literature. 30 (2): 891–892. ISSN 0022-0515. JSTOR 2727709.
- Caffrey, Margaret M. (1992). "Review of The Origins of American Social Science". The American Historical Review. 97 (1): 299. doi:10.2307/2164735. ISSN 0002-8762. JSTOR 2164735.
- Coats, A. W. (1992). "Review of The Origins of American Social Science". Academe. 78 (1): 43–44. doi:10.2307/40251222. ISSN 0190-2946. JSTOR 40251222.
- Cookingham, M. E. (1992). "Review of The Origins of American Social Science". The Journal of Economic History. 52 (3): 737. doi:10.1017/S0022050700011724. ISSN 0022-0507. JSTOR 2122918. S2CID 154636244.
- Cravens, Hamilton (1992). "Review of The Origins of American Social Science". History of Education Quarterly. 32 (3): 397–400. doi:10.2307/368566. ISSN 0018-2680. JSTOR 368566.
- Dworkin, A. Gary (1992). "Review of The Ongins of American Social Science". Social Science Quarterly. 73 (2): 469–470. ISSN 0038-4941. JSTOR 42863059.
- Ellwood, Charles A. (1943). "Review of Origins of American Sociology. The Social Science Movement in the United States". Social Forces. 22 (1): 107–108. doi:10.2307/2571462. ISSN 0037-7732. JSTOR 2571462.
- Farr, James (1991). "Review of The Origins of American Social Science". The American Political Science Review. 85 (4): 1452–1454. doi:10.2307/1963969. ISSN 0003-0554. JSTOR 1963969.
- Fischoff, Ephraim (1944). "Review of Origins of American Sociology". Social Research. 11 (3): 388–390. ISSN 0037-783X. JSTOR 40982039.
- Halfpenny, Peter (1991). "Review of The Origins of American Social Science". Sociology. 25 (3): 552–554. doi:10.1177/0038038591025003036. ISSN 0038-0385. JSTOR 42857690. S2CID 220672655.
- Hilts, Victor L. (1993). "Review of The Origins of American Social Science". Isis. 84 (3): 598–599. doi:10.1086/356605. ISSN 0021-1753. JSTOR 235700.
- Hinkle, Roscoe C. (1992). "Review of The Origins of American Social Science". Contemporary Sociology. 21 (3): 404. doi:10.2307/2076330. ISSN 0094-3061. JSTOR 2076330.
- Hofstadter, Richard (1945). "Review of Origins of American Sociology: The Social Science Movement in the United States". The Journal of Economic History. 5 (1): 93–94. doi:10.1017/S002205070011246X. ISSN 0022-0507. JSTOR 2113175. S2CID 145462161.
- Holmes, Eugene C. (1945). "Review of Origins of American Sociology: The Social Science Movement in the United States". Science & Society. 9 (2): 186–187. doi:10.1177/003682374500900208. ISSN 0036-8237. JSTOR 40399699.
- Hoopes, James (1992). "Review of The Origins of American Social Science". The Journal of Interdisciplinary History. 22 (3): 536–538. doi:10.2307/205020. ISSN 0022-1953. JSTOR 205020.
- House, Floyd N. (1943). "Review of Origins of American Sociology: The Social Science Movement in the United States". American Journal of Sociology. 49 (3): 261. doi:10.1086/219378. ISSN 0002-9602. JSTOR 2771255.
- Joas, Hans (1992). "Review of The Origins of American Social Science". Acta Sociologica. 35 (3): 247–250. doi:10.1177/000169939203500307. ISSN 0001-6993. JSTOR 4194779. S2CID 144955760.
- Jordan, John M. (1992). "Retooled Liberalism? A Review Article". Comparative Studies in Society and History. 34 (3): 560–565. doi:10.1017/S0010417500017953. ISSN 0010-4175. JSTOR 178852. S2CID 145250598.
- Mills, C. Wright (1944). Bernard, L. L.; Bernard, Jessi (eds.). "Origins of American Sociology". The Scientific Monthly. 58 (5): 399–400. ISSN 0096-3771. JSTOR 18072.
- Nuesse, C. J. (1944). "Review of Origins of American Sociology; The Social Science Movement in the United States". The American Catholic Sociological Review. 5 (1): 60–62. doi:10.2307/3706527. ISSN 0362-515X. JSTOR 3706527.
- Weil, François (1993). "Review of The Origins of American Social Science". Annales. Histoire, Sciences Sociales. 48 (2): 327–328. doi:10.1017/S0395264900082688. ISSN 0395-2649. JSTOR 27584405. S2CID 163810755.
- Weintraub, Philipp (1944). "Review of Origins of American Sociology: The Social Science Movement in the United States". The American Economic Review. 34 (3): 582–585. ISSN 0002-8282. JSTOR 1810249.
- Weisberger, Adam M. (1992). "Review of The Origins of American Social Science". American Journal of Sociology. 97 (5): 1528–1530. doi:10.1086/229938. ISSN 0002-9602. JSTOR 2781452.
- Westbrook, Robert (1992). "Review of The Origins of American Social Science". The Journal of American History. 79 (2): 613–615. doi:10.2307/2080053. ISSN 0021-8723. JSTOR 2080053.
- Wolfe, A. B. (1944). "Review of Origins of American Sociology". The Annals of the American Academy of Political and Social Science. 232: 204–205. doi:10.1177/000271624423200153. ISSN 0002-7162. JSTOR 1023378. S2CID 144643712.
