= James Q. Dealey =

American sociologist and newspaper editor

James Quayle Dealey (13 August 1861 – 22 January 1937) was a British-American sociologist, journalist, academic, and newspaper editor. Dealey served as the tenth president of the American Sociological Association.

== Early life and education ==
Dealey was born on 13 August 1861 in Manchester, England to George and Mary Ann Dealey, née Nellins. Dealey was first educated in secondary schools in Liverpool. At the age of nine, Dealey's family moved to Galveston, Texas where attended the local public schools there. When he was seventeen, Dealy was hired at the Galveston News, working alongside his two brothers Thomas and George. Dealey worked at the News for six years, assigned primarily to the mailing room, business office, and circulation department.

Dealey enrolled in the Cook Academy in Montour Falls, New York in 1884, taking college preparatory classes before enrolling at Brown University in Providence, Rhode Island later that year. At Brown, Dealy earned a bachelor's degree in languages in 1890. Dealey returned to Texas after graduation and subsequently worked as a teacher. After returning to Texas, he met Clara Learned, who he married on August 7, 1890, with whom he raised four children.

== Career ==
After he returned to Texas in 1890, Dealey was hired at the University of North Texas (then Denton State Normal School) as a professor of history and ancient languages. The following year, Dealey resigned to accept a position at the Vermont Academy in Saxtons River where he taught Latin and remained for two years. In 1893, Dealey left the Vermont Academy to enroll again at Brown University, completing a master's degree in Greek and German in 1893. Dealey completed his PhD in political and social studies at Brown in sociology in 1895, and upon graduation Dealey accepted an assistant professor position at the university in the department of social and political science. Dealey spent his entire career at Brown University as a professor in the department of social and political science from 1895 until his retirement in 1928. Dealey was promoted to associate professor in 1898, and then to full professor in 1910. While at Brown, Dealey played an instrumental role in bringing Lester F. Ward to the university as a professor of sociology in 1906. Throughout his career, Dealey occasionally taught as a visiting lecturer, first at the Naval War College in Newport, Rhode Island from 1916 to 1928 and also as a visiting professor at Shanghai College in 1921.

Dealey served as the tenth president of the American Sociological Society, delivering his address entitled "Eudemics, the Science of National or General Welfare" at the 1920 annual meeting in Washington, DC. Dealey also the vice president of the American Political Science Association in 1916 and 1923, as well as the president of the Southwest Social Science Association from 1932 to 1933.

=== Editor at Dallas Morning News ===
Upon Dealey's retirement in 1928, he took a position as editor of the Dallas Morning News. At the time, Dealey's brother George Dealey was the president of the newspaper.

== Death ==
Dealey died on 22 January 1937 sitting at his desk at work at the Dallas News while meeting with his brother George. His death was attributed to a heart problem he had been afflicted with for several years prior.

== Bibliography ==
=== Sole authored books ===
- Dealey, James Q. (1907). Our State Constitutions. Philadelphia: American Academy of Political and Social Science.
- Dealey, James Q. (1909). Sociology: Its Simpler Teachings and Applications. New York: Silver, Burdett and Company.
- Dealey, James Q. (1909). The Development of the State: Its Governmental Organization and Its Activities. New York: Silver, Burdett and Company.
- Dealey, James Q. (1910). Ethical and Religious Significance of the State. Philadelphia: American Baptist Publication Society.
- Dealey, James Q. (1912). The Family in Its Sociological Aspects. Boston: Houghton Mifflin Company.
- Dealey, James Q. (1915). Growth of American State Constitutions from 1776 to the End of the Year 1914. Boston: Ginn and Company.
- Dealey, James Q. (1921). Sociology: Its Development and Applications. New York and London: D. Appleton and Company.
- Dealey, James Q. (1921). The State And Government. New York and London: D. Appleton and Company.
- Dealey, James Q. (1921). Foreign Policies of the United States: Their Bases and Development. Boston: Ginn and Company.
- Dealey, James Q. (1928). Political Situations in Rhode Island and Suggested Constitutional Changes. Providence: Oxford Press.

=== Co-authored books ===
- Dealey, James Q.; Ward, Lester Frank (1905). A Text-Book of Sociology. New York: The MacMillan Company.
