= Drexel =

Drexel may refer to:

== People ==
- Drexel (name)

== Places ==
- Drexel, Missouri
- Drexel, North Carolina
- Drexel, Ohio
- Drexel Hill, Pennsylvania

== Other uses ==
- Disappearance of Brittanee Drexel
- Drexel Heritage, a furniture manufacturer
- Drexel University
- Drexel Burnham Lambert, a now defunct investment bank
- Drexel Dragons, the athletic program of Drexel University
- The Drexel Collection of books about music and musical scores donated by Joseph William Drexel to The New York Public Library in 1888
  - Drexel 4041, a 17th-century British music manuscript commonplace book
  - Drexel 4257, a 17th-century British music manuscript commonplace book

== See also ==
- Drexler
