= Craig Buttars =

American politician

Member of the Utah House of Representatives from the 3rd district
- In office January 1, 1997 – December 31, 2006
- Succeeded by: Jack Draxler

Personal details
- Born: March 5, 1957 (age 69)
- Party: Republican

Craig Buttars (born March 5, 1957) is an American politician who served in the Utah House of Representatives from the 3rd district from 1997 to 2006.
