= Trexler =

Trexler may refer to:

- Trexler (surname)
- Trexler, Berks County, Pennsylvania, an unincorporated community in Albany Township
- Trexler Nature Preserve, in Lehigh County, Pennsylvania

== See also ==
- Trexlertown, Pennsylvania, a census-designated place in Lehigh County
