= Jack Draxler =

American politician

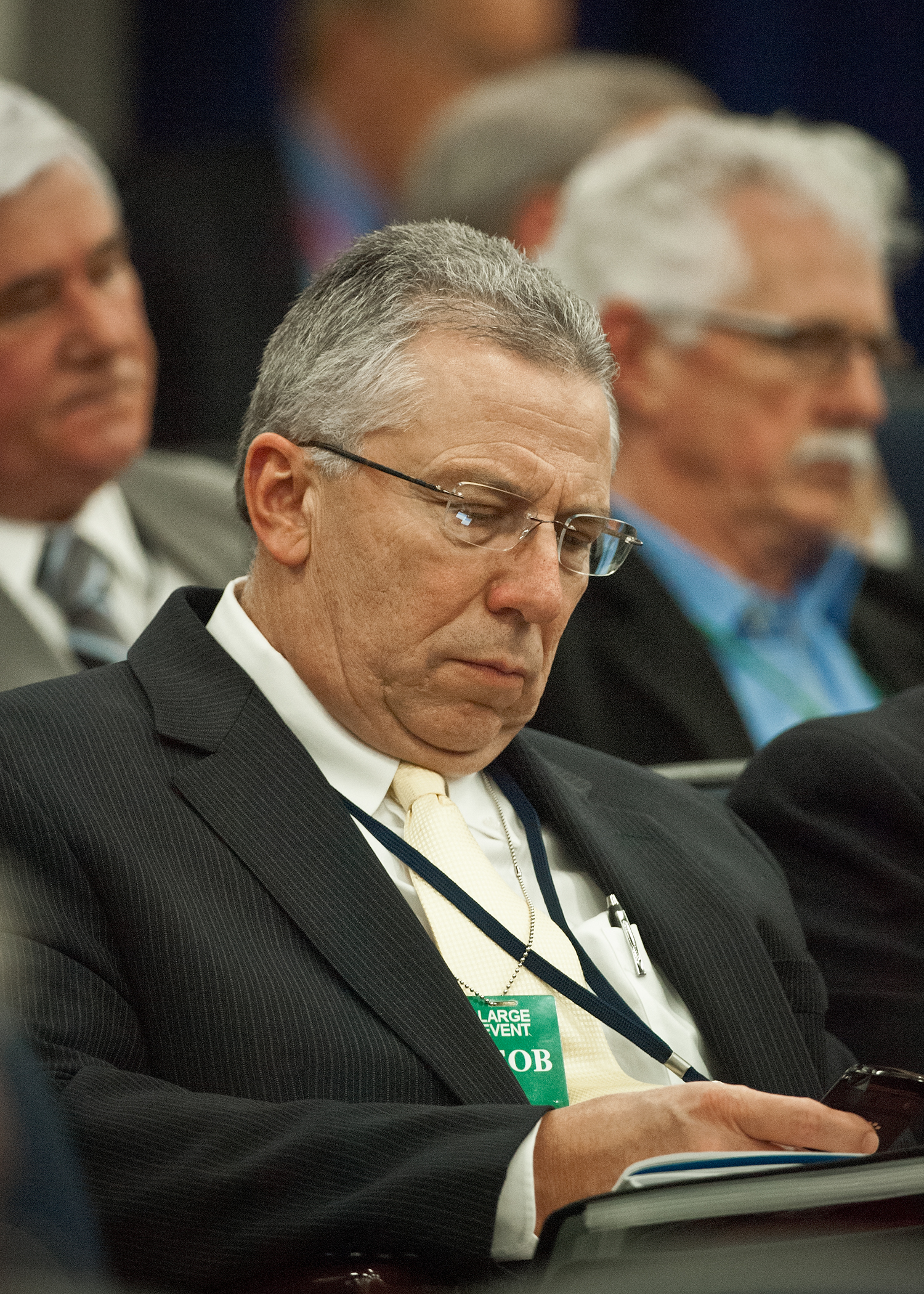

Member of the Utah House of Representatives from the 3rd district
- In office January 2007 – January 2017
- Preceded by: Craig Buttars
- Succeeded by: Val Potter

Personal details
- Born: February 18
- Party: Republican
- Spouse: Marilyn
- Education: Utah State University
- Profession: Real estate appraiser

Jack R. Draxler is an American politician and a former Republican member of the Utah House of Representatives. He represented District 3 from January 2007 through January 2017. Draxler was previously the mayor of North Logan.

== Early life and career ==
Draxler earned his BS degree from Utah State University and currently works as a real estate appraiser. He lives in North Logan, Utah with his wife, Marilyn.

== Political career ==
In 2014, Draxler was unopposed in the Republican primary and general election. He won the 2014 general election with 7,191 votes (100%).

In 2012, Draxler was unopposed for the June 26, 2012 Republican primary and won the November 6, 2012 general election with 9,995 votes (70.5%) against Democratic nominee Roger Donohoe.

In 2010, Draxler was unopposed for both the June 22, 2010 Republican primary and the November 2, 2010 general election, winning with 7,421 votes.

In 2008, Draxler was unopposed for the June 24, 2008 Republican primary and won the November 4, 2008 general election with 9,670 votes (74.1%) against Democratic nominee Tanya Taylor.

In 2006, when District 3 incumbent Republican Representative Craig Buttars retired and left the seat open, Draxler was unopposed for the 2006 Republican primary and won the November 7, 2006 general election with 4,611 votes (64.9%) against Democratic nominee Stuart Howell.

During the 2016 legislative session, Draxler served on the Higher Education Appropriations Subcommittee, the House Government Operations Committee, and the House Transportation Committee.

== 2016 sponsored legislation ==
Bill number	Bill title	Status
HB0016	Offender Registry Amendments	Governor Signed - 3/23/2016
HB0027	School District Participation in Risk Management Fund	Governor Signed - 3/22/2016
HB0183	County Options Sales and Use Tax for Highways and Public Transit Amendments	House/ to Governor - 3/17/2016
HB0359	Political Subdivision Ethics Commission Amendments	Governor Signed - 3/22/2016
HB0438	Amendments to Election Law	House/ filed - 3/10/2016

Draxler passed four of the five bills he introduced during the 2016 legislative session, giving him an 80% passage rate. Draxler also floor sponsored ten bills.
