= Sherman Drexler =

American painter (1925–2014)

- Born: January 3, 1925; New York City, U.S.
- Died: July 19, 2014 (aged 89); Newark, New Jersey, U.S.
- Education: University of California
- Occupation: Painter
- Spouse: Rosalyn Bronznick (m. 1946)
- Children: 2

Sherman Drexler (January 3, 1925 – July 19, 2014) was an American figurative expressionist painter best known for his paintings of female nudes. He also taught at several institutions, including Cooper Union School of Art (1974) and the University of Pennsylvania (1980). His career spanned more than 50 years. He was married to the Pop artist and playwright Rosalyn Drexler (1926-2025).

== Early life ==
Sherman Drexler was born in Brooklyn, New York, in 1925. He spent his infancy in Seagate, Coney Island, but he grew up mainly in the Bronx. Drexler began painting at an early age; he took up and painting in earnest when he was 17 years old, modelling his work after Henri Matisse and Amedeo Modigliani. He was admitted to University of California, Berkeley, as an English major, but began studying the works of Old Masters, Da Vinci in particular, and left Berkeley without completing his studies there. He earned his degree a decade later when he returned to receive a B.F.A.

== Career ==
Drexler's first exhibition, in 1956, was in Berkeley, California, at the Courtyard Gallery. Drexler returned to New York in the same year and began teaching at a local junior high school. In 1958, Drexler made his New York premier with an exhibition at the Seven Arts Gallery. He also enrolled at Hunter College where he studied under prominent artists including Robert Motherwell.

Although Drexler was a figurative painter at a time when abstract expressionism enjoyed great popularity, he soon became a part of the New York School of the late 1950s and 1960s. He met and befriended Franz Kline, Andy Warhol and Alex Katz. In the early 1960s Drexler was featured in many solo exhibitions including shows at New York City galleries including the Rice and Tibor De Nagy Galleries. Many of Drexler's works in this period took female nudes as subjects, setting them against monochromatic backgrounds. Drexler's works often made reference to contemporary events, including Pete Rose's defeat by Joe DiMaggio, or mythical/biblical narratives, such as Leda and the Swan or Adam and Eve's expulsion from Eden. Drexler's works often portrayed the human body in motion.

From 1961 to 1963, Drexler curated art exhibits for Special School (P.S.) #619 to benefit the Brother Island Drug Rehabilitation Facility in The Bronx. The facility closed in 1963.

In 1966, Drexler was awarded a fellowship from the Guggenheim Foundation.

In 1983, Drexler made a journey to the Cave of Altamira in Spain and the Grotte Chauvet in southern France. The Paleolithic drawings that he saw there influenced his later work. Though Drexler continued his work with the female nude, he turned his attention to representing animals, using found objects, painting on stones, wood and scrap metal as his canvases. He developed an interest in Primitivism which he displayed in 1995 in a group show featuring older artists titled "Still Working." In 2005, the New York Times reviewer Ken Johnson described a "persuasive sense of urgency" in the work and described Drexler as a "modern cave painter".

Drexler died on July 19, 2014, of cancer at his studio in Newark, New Jersey. In 2016, his portrait of his wife Rosalyn Drexler was included in her exhibition Who Does She Think She Is? at Rose Art Museum, Brandeis University.
