= Sweet Taste of Liberty: A True Story of Slavery and Restitution in America =

Book by W. Caleb McDaniel

- Pulitzer Prize in History 2020
- Author: W. Caleb McDaniel
- Language: English
- Genre: Non-fiction
- Publication place: United States
- Pages: 319

Sweet Taste of Liberty: A True Story of Slavery and Restitution in America is a book by W. Caleb McDaniel. It won the 2020 Pulitzer Prize for History.

== See also ==
- Bibliography of the slave trade in the United States
