= Rosalyn Drexler =

American visual artist and novelist (1926–2025)

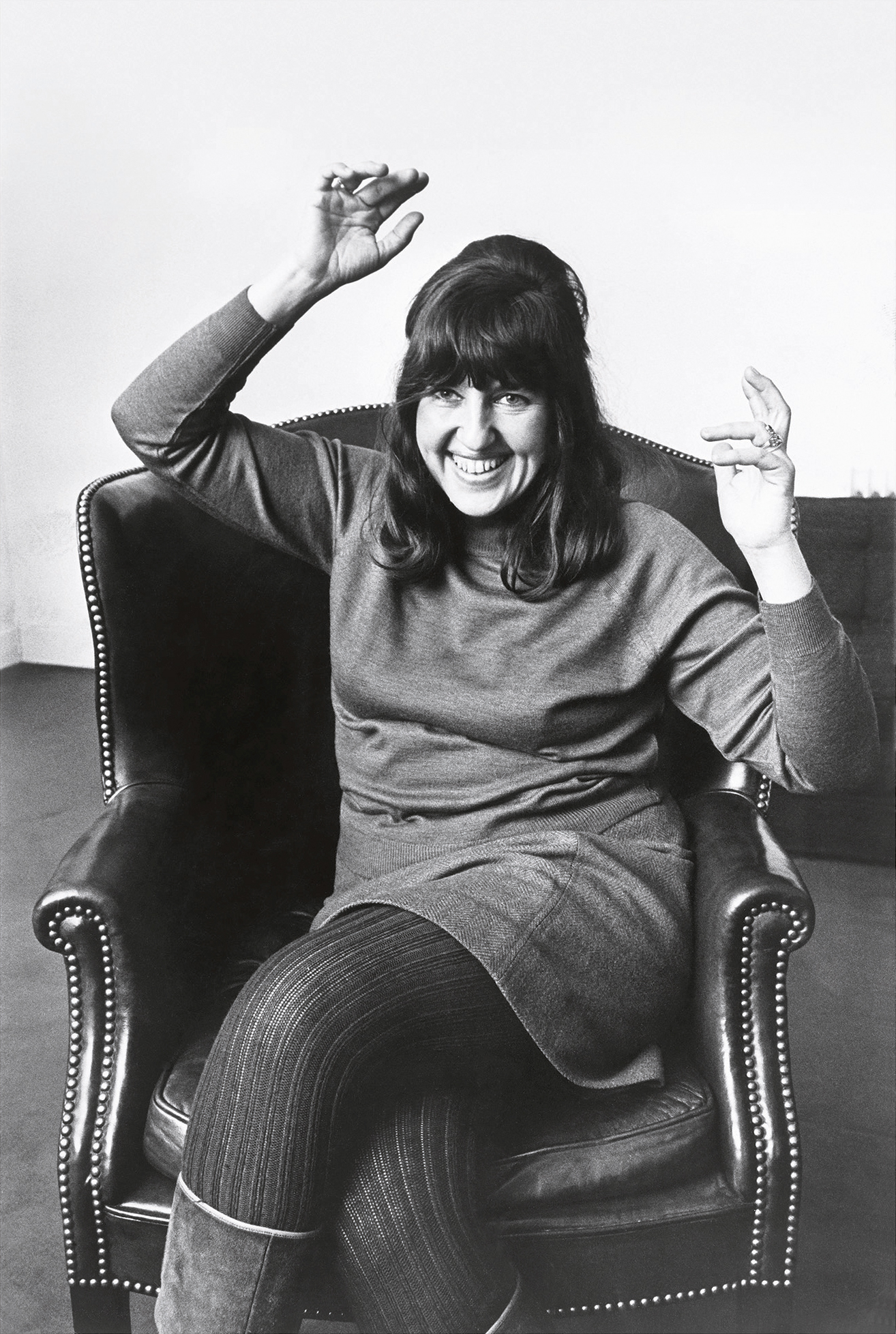
- Rosalyn Drexler at her publisher's office (circa 1960)
- Born: Rosalyn Bronznick; November 25, 1926; New York City, U.S.
- Died: September 3, 2025 (aged 98); New York City, U.S.
- Other name: Julia Sorel
- Known for: Painting
- Notable work: Marilyn Pursued by Death, 1963
- Movement: Pop art
- Spouse: Sherman Drexler (m. 1946; died 2014)
- Children: 2

Rosalyn Drexler (née Bronznick; November 25, 1926 – September 3, 2025) was an American visual artist, novelist, Obie Award-winning playwright, Emmy Award-winning screenwriter and professional wrestler.

Although she had a polymathic career, Drexler is perhaps best known for her pop art paintings and as the author of the novelization of the film Rocky, under the pseudonym Julia Sorel. Drexler lived and worked in New York City, New York.

== Early life and education ==
Rosalyn Drexler (née Bronznick) was born on November 25, 1926, in the Bronx, New York. She grew up in the Bronx and East Harlem, New York. Drexler had considerable exposure to the performing arts as a child, attending vaudeville shows with her friends and family. Her parents also exposed her to the visual arts at an early age, buying her art posters, books, coloring boxes, and crayons, which she cited as an influence. She attended the High School of Music and Art in New York City where she majored in voice. She attended Hunter College for one semester only before leaving school to marry figure painter Sherman Drexler at 19 in 1946. She is the subject of many of her husband's paintings.

== Professional wrestling career ==
In 1951, Drexler and her husband lived in Hell's Kitchen in Manhattan near Bothner's Gymnasium, where a number of female professional wrestlers practiced. After a friend of Drexler's suggested that she might enjoy trying wrestling, she began to work out at Bothner's. She soon learned how to wrestle without hurting anyone and how to make maximum noise while wrestling to exaggerate the impact of her performance. Drexler eventually travelled for wrestling matches, which allowed her to travel to the South and to Florida under the character of "Rosa Carlo, the Mexican Spitfire." While on tour, she wrestled in odd places such as a graveyard and an airplane-hangar. There is also a photo of her getting ready with an advertisement that she would be fighting Mae Young, a famous professional wrestler. She went on tour around the country, but returned home after becoming upset about racism in the southern states, such as segregated seating and water fountains. Andy Warhol made a series of silkscreen paintings based on a photograph of Drexler as Rosa Carlo.

Drexler's experience as Rosa Carlo later formed the basis of her 1972 critically acclaimed novel To Smithereens. She wrote the novel because she hated the experience, but thought it should not be wasted, and she should "at least get a book out of it." The novel was the basis of the 1980 film Below the Belt. The producers contacted Drexler about the title, to which she said that it was "not a wrestling title at all…[but] they said, 'It sounds sexy.'" When she was 54, she tried getting back into being an athlete and entered a power lifting contest, which she did not win.

She has made several paintings based around women's wrestling, including Take Down (1963), Lost Match (1962), and The Winner (1965).

== Writing career ==
=== Novels ===
- I Am the Beautiful Stranger (Grossman, 1965, OCLC 1730279)
- One or Another (1970)
- To Smithereens (1972)
- The Cosmopolitan Girl (1974)
- Unwed Widow (1975)—written under the pseudonym Julia Sorel
- Starburn: The Story of Jenni Love (1979)
- Bad Guy (1982)
- Art Does (Not!) Exist (1996)
- Vulgar Lives (2007)

=== Adapted screenplays ===
Written under the pseudonym Julia Sorel:

- Dawn: Portrait of a Teenage Runaway (1976)—Adapted from the screenplay by Dalene Young
- Rocky (1976)—Based on the screenplay by Sylvester Stallone
- Alexander, The Other Side of Dawn (1977)—Adapted from the screenplay by Dalene Young
- See How She Runs (1978)—Adapted from the screenplay by Marvin Gluck

=== Plays ===
- Home Movies (1964, OCLC 27140432)
- The Line of Least Existence and Other Plays (1967, OCLC 44002453)
- "Skywriting" in Collision Course (1968, OCLC 22335157)
- "Hot Buttered Roll" in Theatre Experiment: An Anthology of American Plays (1968, OCLC 932221009)
- Methuen Playscripts (1969)
- "Home Movies" in The Off-Off Broadway Book: The Plays, People, Theatre (1972)
- Fiction (1972)
- "Skywriting" in A Century of Plays by American Women, edited by Rachel France (1979)
- Transients Welcome: Three One-Act Plays (1984)
- "Occupational Hazard" in Women on the Verge: 7 Avant-Garde American Plays (1993)

=== Productions ===
- Home Movies—Judson Memorial Church, Provincetown Playhouse, NYC 1964
- The Investigation—Theatre Company of Boston 1966; New Dramatist's Committee, NYC 1966; Milwaukee Repertory Theater 1966; Open Space Theatre, London 1969; Miami University, Ohio 1979
- The Line of Least Existence—Judson Poets' Theatre, NYC 1969; Theatre of the Living Arts, Philadelphia 1970; Traverse, Edinburgh 1968; Network Theatre, NYC 1980
- Hot Buttered Roll—New Dramatist's Committee, NYC 1968; Milwaukee Repertory Theater 1966; Open Space Theatre, London 1969
- Skywriting—Cafe Au GoGo, NYC 1968; Dowling College, Suffolk County, NY 1973
- The Ice Queen—The Proposition, Boston 1973; Kornblee Gallery, NYC 1965 (with puppets)
- Softly and Consider the Nearness—Manhattan Theatre Club, NYC 1973; West Carolina University, NC 1973
- The Bed Was Full—New Dramatist's Committee, NYC 1972
- She Who Was He—Virginia Commonwealth University, Richmond 1974; Odeon Theatre, New York 1974
- Travesty Parade—Center Theatre Group, Los Angeles 1974
- The Writer's Opera—Theatre for the New City, NYC 1979.
- Graven Image—Theatre for the New City, NYC 1980; Oberlin College, Ohio 1980
- Vulgar Lives—La MaMa Experimental Theatre Club, NYC 1979
- The Tree Artist—Gateway, Long Island, NY 1981
- Starburn—Theatre for the New City, NYC 1983
- The Mandrake—Center Stage, Baltimore 1983
- Dear—SoHo Repertory, NYC 1983
- Room 17C—Omaha Magic, NE 1983
- Delicate Feelings—Theatre for the New City, NYC 1984

=== Television ===
Drexler was one of 15 writers for the 1973 CBS comedy special Lily, starring Lily Tomlin, Alan Alda, and Richard Pryor.

== Career in the visual arts ==
Drexler began making found object sculptures for display in her home while living in Berkeley, California where her husband was finishing his art degree. The sculptures were plaster accretions, built around found scrap metal and wood armatures, and reflected the informal Abstract Expressionist-influenced Beat sculpture of the time. In 1955, Drexler exhibited her first works alongside her husband's paintings.

At the urging of the sculptor David Smith and art dealer Ivan Karp, she continued to exhibit after the couple moved to New York City. One critic called these early works "ridiculous and nutty" sculptures that revealed a "real beauty beneath their I-don't-care attitudes." Her works were shown in New York in 1960 at Reuben Gallery, at which she participated in Happenings. Her work was praised by David Smith and Franz Kline of the New York School. When the Reuben Gallery closed after one year, she received no offers because "women [sculptors] were not bankable at [the] time." She made a swift shift to painting in an attempt to gain more offers. She did odd jobs to make a living while artmaking, including being a waitress, a cigarette girl, a hatcheck, and a masseuse.

Love and Violence (1965) at the Whitney Museum of American Art in 2022

By 1961, Drexler started changing her work from assemblage to Pop Art. She searched through old magazines, posters, and newspapers to source imagery for her paintings. Her self-taught process consisted of blowing up images from magazines and newspapers, collaging them onto canvas, and then painting over them in bright, saturated colors. She also has a fondness for Elmer's Glue in her work, saying it "doesn't get enough credit for its role in art." Drexler never had a studio of her own while she wasn't a student, and usually worked anywhere she could, typically the home.

Drexler signed with Kornblee Gallery, where she had solo shows from 1964 to 1966. In January 1964 her work was included in the "First International Girlie Exhibit" at Pace Gallery, New York. She and Marjorie Strider were the only two women Pop artists included in this exhibition, which also featured Warhol, Roy Lichtenstein, and Tom Wesselmann. Drexler exhibited collages cut and pasted from girlie magazines. The work scandalized some, but her paintings were mostly well received. One critic noted, "Miss Drexler's collage paintings…fly through contemporary life and fantasy with a virtuosic, uninhibited imagination that is refreshingly direct in its frank expression of brutality, desire, pathos and playfulness."

Drexler's paintings continued to enjoy favorable reviews and were exhibited in major Pop art exhibitions throughout the 1960s. She did not gain the level of recognition of many of her male peers; the major themes in her paintings—violence against women, racism, social alienation—were controversial topics in a genre known for being "cool" and detached. She stated:

I was happy being productive and having good friends and being ignored. But now I'm getting angry about it, looking back!

Drexler's Pop paintings have been identified more recently as early feminist artworks, although Drexler objected to this categorization, denying any deliberate political message in her work. In spite of this, in 1968, Drexler signed the "Writers and Editors War Tax Protest" pledge, vowing to refuse tax payments in protest against the Vietnam War.

In 2018 her work received renewed critical attention and a career retrospective exhibition at the Rose Art Museum. In 2022, the Hirshhorn Museum and Sculpture Garden referenced the name of Drexler's 1963 painting "Put it this way" in their exhibit "Put It This Way: (Re)visions of The Hirshhorn Collection," which ran until Fall 2023.

=== Major themes and works ===
As well as drawing from her own experience, Drexler's work often revolves around women's roles as portrayed in pulp cinema, including women as moll, femme fatale, home wrecker - those in need of "moral comeuppance". Her images were drawn from easily understood public media.

Her The Love and Violence series is a body of paintings that depicts abusive relationships between men and women. The canvases evoke the covers of pulp fiction novels, B-movie posters, and scenes from gangster films or film noir. Works such as I Won't Hurt You (1964), This is My Wedding (1963), and Rape (1962) depict sexual violence against women. While the men depicted are most often the abusers, in some paintings, such as Kiss Me, Stupid (1964) and Dangerous Liaison (1963), the dynamic between the male and female subjects is left more indeterminate. Other works in this series include The Bite (1963), Love and Violence (1965), and Baby, It's Alright (1963).

Is It True What They Say About Dixie? (1966) was inspired by a newspaper photo of Bull Connor, the police chief who instigated the Birmingham race riot of 1963, leading a group of white supremacists. The figures advance towards the viewer dressed in black suits against a stark white background. The painting, with a title taken from an American popular song, acts as an ironic commentary on the racial violence of her time. Similar in composition and intent is the painting F.B.I. (1964) that both glamorizes the depicted government agents and questions their status as figures of authority.

The Men and Machines series, showing working men with various types of mechanical equipment, portrays Cold War era images of technological advancements and plays on the cliché of machines as phallic symbols of male sexual power. Paintings in this series include Pilot to Tower (1966). Marilyn Pursued by Death (1967) is an image of Marilyn Monroe being followed by a male figure. Although "Death" appears to be a stalker or member of the paparazzi, the photograph after which the painting was made makes clear that the man is actually her bodyguard.

Rosalyn Drexler Paintings made after movie posters include King Kong aka The Dream (1963), modeled after the lobby card for John Lemont's 1961 film Konga, and Chubby Checker (1964), based on the poster for 1961 movie musical Twist Around the Clock.

=== Connections with other artists ===
Drexler listed Franz Kline and Bill and Elaine de Kooning as close friends of her and her husband. She also had connections to Eva Hesse, George Segal (whom she posed for), Lucas Samaras, Claes Oldenburg, Billy Kluver, Bob Beauchamp, Dodie Müller, Alice Neel, and Joy Harjo. She also worked on plays with John Vaccaro, whom she described as "a terrifying creative projectile…"

=== Solo exhibitions ===
- Reuben Gallery, New York, February 19 – March 10 (1960)
- Rosalyn Drexler, Kornblee Gallery, New York, March 17 – April 14 (1964)
- Rosalyn Drexler, Ward-Nasse Gallery, Boston, October 3–22 (1964)
- Rosalyn Drexler, Kornblee Gallery, New York, April 24 – May 8 (1965)
- Rosalyn Drexler, Kornblee Gallery, New York, March 19 – April 14 (1966)
- Rosalyn Drexler, The Contemporary Gallery, Jewish Community Center, Kansas City, Missouri, November 4–24 (1967)
- Rosalyn Drexler: Intimate Emotions, Grey Art Gallery and Study Center, New York University, New York, July 14 – August 28, 1986; Greenville County Museum of Art, South Carolina, September 9 – October 12, 1986; Museum of Art, University of Iowa, Iowa City, November 1, 1986 – January 11, 1987 (1987)
- Life: The Magic Show, La MaMa Galleria, New York, November (1992)
- Nothing Personal: Recent Paintings, Maurine and Robert Rothschild Gallery, Bunting Institute, Radcliffe College, Cambridge, Massachusetts, September 27 – October 18 (1998)
- I Won't Hurt You: Paintings, 1962–1999, Nicholas Davies Gallery, New York, March 7 – April 8 (2000)
- Rosalyn Drexler: To Smithereens, Paintings, 1961–2003, Rosenwald-Wolf Gallery, University of the Arts, Philadelphia, February 27 – April 9 (2004)
- Rosalyn Drexler and the Ends of Man: Works from 1961–2001, Paul Robeson Gallery, Rutgers University–Newark, September 5 – October 18 (2006)
- Rosalyn Drexler: I Am the Beautiful Stranger, Paintings of the '60s, Pace Wildenstein, New York, March 16 – April 21 (2007)
- Rosalyn Drexler: Vulgar Lives, Garth Greenan Gallery, New York, February 19 – March 28 (2015)
- Rosalyn Drexler: Who Does She Think She Is?, Rose Art Museum, Brandeis University, Waltham, Massachusetts, February 11, 2016 – June 6, 2016; Albright Knox Art Gallery, Buffalo, October 22, 2016 – January 29, 2017; Mildred Lane Kemper Art Museum, St. Louis, February 10 – April 17, 2017 (2016)

=== Select group exhibitions ===
- Rosalyn and Sherman Drexler, Courtyard Gallery, Berkeley, California, November 29 – December 15 (1954)
- Homage to Albert Camus, Stuttman Gallery, New York, New York, May 4–28 (1960)
- New Forms—New Media II, Martha Jackson Gallery, New York, September 28 – October 22 (1960)
- The Closing Show: 1952–1962, Tanager Gallery, New York, May 25 – June 14 (1962)
- Rosalyn Drexler and Tom Doyle, Zabriskie Gallery, New York, April 15 – May 4 (1963)
- Contemporary Sculptors, Riverside Museum, New York, New York. April–May 26 (1963)
- Summer Shades, Kornblee Gallery, New York, New York, July 6–31 (1963)
- Pop Art USA, Oakland Art Museum, California, and California College of the Arts, Oakland, September 7–29
- Mixed Media and Pop Art, Albright-Knox Art Gallery, Buffalo, New York, November 19 – December 15
- Inform and Interpret, American Federation of Arts, New York (1964)
- Washington Gallery of Modern Art, Washington, DC (1964)
- First International Girlie Show, Pace Gallery, New York, January 7–25; Pace Gallery, Boston, February 16 – March 11 (1964)
- Some Contemporary American Figure Painters, Wadsworth Atheneum, Hartford, Connecticut, May 1–31 (1964)
- Collage-Assemblage Exhibition, Pace Gallery, Boston, Massachusetts, December 1–31 (1964)
- The Painter and the Photograph, Rose Art Museum, Brandeis University, Waltham, Massachusetts, October 5 – November 2, 1964; Museum of Art, Indiana University, Bloomington, November 15 – December 20, 1964; Museum of Art, University of Iowa, Iowa City, January 3 – February 10, 1965; Isaac Delgado Museum of Art, New Orleans, February 28 – March 22, 1965; Museum of Art, University of New Mexico, Albuquerque, April 1 – May 7, 1965; Santa Barbara Museum of Art, California, May 19 – June 21, 1965 (1964)
- American Federation of Arts: Inform and Interpret, Purdue University, West Lafayette, IN, October 1–22, 1965; Akron Art Museum, OH, November 5–26, 1965; Contemporary Arts Association, Houston, TX, December 10–31, 1965; Centennial Art Museum, Corpus Christi, TX, January 14 – February 4, 1966; Juniata College, Huntington, PA, February 23 – March 16, 1966; Ithaca College, NY, May 3–24, 1966; State University College, Brockport, NY, July 20 – August 17, 1966; State University of New York, Potsdam, October 5–26, 1966 (1964)
- Recent Acquisitions, Whitney Museum, New York, New York, May 19, 1965 – May 15, 1966 (1965)
- Eleven from the Reuben Gallery, Solomon R. Guggenheim Museum, New York, January (1965)
- The New American Realism, Worcester Art Museum, Massachusetts, February 18 – April 4 (1965)
- Pop Art and the American Tradition, Milwaukee Art Center, Wisconsin, April 9 – May 9 (1965)
- The Harry N. Abrams Family Collection, Jewish Museum, New York, June 29 – September 5 (1966)
- The Helen W. and Robert M. Benjamin Collection, Yale University Art Gallery, New Haven, Connecticut, May 4 – June 18 (1967)
- Protest and Hope: An Exhibition of Contemporary American Art, Wollman Hall, New School Art Center, New York City, October 24 – December 2 (1967)
- Homage to Marilyn Monroe, Sidney Janis Gallery, New York, December 6–30 (1967)
- Selections from the Permanent Collection, Whitney Museum of American Art, New York, New York, December 1968–February (1969)
- January '70: Contemporary Women Artists, Hathorn Gallery, Skidmore College, Saratoga Springs, New York, January 6–29 (1970)
- Pop Plus: Selections from the Permanent Collection, Whitney Museum of American Art Downtown Branch, New York, New York, June 20 – August 16 (1970)
- Women in the Permanent Collection, Whitney Museum of American Art, New York, New York, December 16, 1970 – January 19, 1971 (1970)
- Unmanly Art, Suffolk Museum, Stony Brook, New York, October 14 – November 24 (1972)
- Rockland Community College, State University of New York, Suffern (1973)
- Six Women at Bienville, Bienville Gallery, New Orleans, Louisiana, March 27 – April 13 (1974)
- American Pop Art, Whitney Museum of American Art, New York, April 6 – June 16 (1974)
- Pop Plus: Selections from the Permanent Collection, Whitney Museum of American Art, New York, June 20 – August 15 (1977)
- Another Aspect of Pop Art, Institute for Art and Urban Resources, P.S. 1 Contemporary Art Center, Queens, New York, October 1 – November 19 (1978)
- Women Artists in Washington Collections, Art Gallery, University of Maryland, College Park, January 18 – February 25 (1979)
- American Women Artists: Part I, 20th Century Pioneers, Sidney Janis Gallery, New York, January 12 – February 4 (1984)
- 1+1, Bernice Steinbaum Gallery, New York, January 24 – February 18 (1984)
- The New Portrait, Institute for Art and Urban Resources, P.S. 1 Contemporary Art Center, Queens, New York, April 25 – June 10 (1984)
- Made in U.S.A.: An Americanization in Modern Art, the '50s and '60s, University Art Museum, University of California, Berkeley, April 4 – June 21; Nelson-Atkins Museum of Art, Kansas City, Missouri, July 25 – September 6; Virginia Museum of Fine Arts, Richmond, October 7 – December 7 (1987)
- The Abortion Project, Simon Watson Gallery, New York, March 30 – April 27 (1991)
- Anniversary Invitational, AIR Gallery, New York (1992)
- In the Ring, Newhouse Center for Contemporary Art, Snug Harbor Cultural Center, Staten Island, New York, March 21 – September 6 (1993)
- Pop Art: U.S./U.K. Connections, 1956–1966, Menil Collection, Houston, January 26 – May 13 (2001)
- Beauty and the Blonde: An Exploration of American Art and Popular Culture, Mildred Lane Kemper Art Museum, Washington University in St. Louis, Missouri, November 16, 2007 – January 28, 2008 (2007)
- 50 Years at Pace, Pace Gallery, New York, September 17 – October 23 (2010)
- Seductive Subversion: Women Pop Artists, 1958–1968, Rosenwald-Wolf Gallery, University of the Arts, Philadelphia, January 22 – March 15, 2010; Sheldon Museum of Art, Lincoln, Nebraska, July 30 – September 10, 2010; Brooklyn Art Museum, New York, October 10, 2010 – January 9, 2011; Tufts University Art Gallery, Medford, Massachusetts, January 20 – April 3 (2011)
- Power Up: Female Pop Art, Kunsthalle Wien, Vienna, November 5, 2010 – February 20, 2011; Deichtorhallen Hamburg, April 29 – July 10, 2011; Städtische Galerie Bietigheim-Bissingen, Germany, July 23 – October 9 (2011)
- In the Pink, Joe Sheftel Gallery, New York, June 21 – July 3 (2012)
- Sinister Pop, Whitney Museum of American Art, November 15, 2012–March 31 (2013)
- Pop Abstraction, Garth Greenan Gallery, New York, January 18 – February 15 (2014)
- Pop to Popism, Art Gallery of New South Wales, Sydney, November 1, 2014 – March 1, 2015 (2014)
- Paper, Garth Greenan Gallery, New York, July 9 – August 14 (2015)
- International Pop, Walker Art Center, Minneapolis, Minnesota, April 11 – September 6; Dallas Museum of Art, Dallas, Texas, October 11, 2015 – January 17, 2016; Philadelphia Museum of Art, Pennsylvania, February 24 – May 15 (2015)
- Human Interest: Portraits from the Whitney's Collection, Whitney Museum of American Art, New York, April 6, 2016 – February 12, 2017 (2016)
- Inventing Downtown: Artist-Run Galleries in New York City, 1952–1965, Grey Art Gallery, New York University, January 10 – April 1 (2017)
- March Madness, Fort Gansevoort, New York City, March 17 – May 7 (2017)
- POP ART - Icons that matter, Collection du Whitney Museum of American Art, New York, musée Maillol, Paris - September 22, 2017 – January 21, 2018 (2018)

=== Public collections ===
- Allen Memorial Art Museum, Oberlin College, Ohio
- Davison Art Center, Wesleyan University, Connecticut
- Grey Art Gallery and Study Center, New York University, New York
- Greenville County Museum of Art, South Carolina
- Hirshhorn Museum and Sculpture Garden, Smithsonian Institution, Washington, D.C.
- Wadsworth Atheneum, Hartford, Connecticut
- Walker Art Center, Minneapolis, Minnesota
- Whitney Museum of American Art, New York
- Cornell Fine Arts Museum, Winter Park, Florida
- Philadelphia Museum of Art, Philadelphia
- Pennsylvania Academy of the Fine Arts, Philadelphia
- Rose Art Museum, Brandeis University, Waltham, Massachusetts

== Select awards ==
- 1964 Obie Award for Distinguished Play, Home Movies
- 1965, 1968, 1974, 1986 Rockefeller Grants in Playwriting
- 1966 Paris Review Humor Prize, Dear
- 1970-71 Guggenheim Fellowship for Fiction
- 1973 Emmy Award for Best Writing for Comedy-Variety (Special Program), Lily
- 1979 Obie Award for Best Playwriting, The Writer's Opera
- 1985 Obie Award for Best Playwriting, Transients Welcome
- 1990 New York Foundation for the Arts, Grant in Playwriting
- 1991 National Endowment for the Arts, Grant in Theater
- 1994, 2000 Pollock-Krasner Foundation, Grant in Painting
- 1997-8 Bunting Fellowship at Radcliffe College/Harvard University, Visual Arts-Painting
- 2005 Helen & George Segal Foundation, Grant in Painting
- 2007 Honorary Degree of Doctor of Fine Arts from the University of the Arts, Philadelphia

== References in pop culture ==
In 1975, Drexler was the subject of Who Does She Think She Is? (1975), an hour-long film directed by Patricia Lewis Jaffe and Gaby Rodgers. Her novel To Smithereens suggested Below the Belt in 1980, directed by Robert Fowler.

== Personal life and death ==
Drexler had a son and a daughter with her husband, Sherman Drexler. Her daughter died in 2010, and her husband died in 2014. She died in Manhattan, New York City on September 3, 2025, at the age of 98.
