= Robert Dressler =

Robert Dressler may refer to:

- Rob Dressler (born 1954), American baseball player
- Robert A. Dressler (1945–2024), American lawyer and politician
- Robert Louis Dressler (1927–2019), American orchidologist
