= Trexler (surname) =

Trexler is a surname. Notable people with the surname include:

- Harry Clay Trexler (1854–1933), American industrialist from Pennsylvania;
- Marion Trexler (1891–1968), American racing driver;
- Georg Trexler (1903–1979), German composer;
- Richard Trexler (1932–2007), American historian;
- David Trexler (born 1955), American paleontologist.
