= William Dressler (anthropologist) =

American anthropologist

William W. Dressler
- Born: 1951 (age 74–75); Ida Grove, Iowa
- Awards: Stirling Award in Culture and Personality Studies American Anthropological Association (1979); Fellow, Society for Applied Anthropology (1996); John P. Kirscht Distinguished Lecturer, School of Public Health, The University of Michigan (2000); Book award, Society for Anthropological Sciences (2019)

Academic background
- Education: Grinnell College; University of Connecticut
- Thesis: "Hypertension in St. Lucia: social and cultural dimensions" (1978)

Academic work
- Discipline: Anthropology
- Sub-discipline: Psychological anthropology, Medical anthropology,
- Institutions: University of Alabama

William W. "Bill" Dressler (born 1951) is an American anthropologist known for his concept of cultural consonance and work on cultural models especially in the context of biocultural medical anthropology. He has done fieldwork in Mexico, Brazil, the West Indies, and the United States, and worked at the University of Alabama since 1978. He is now professor emeritus. In 2023, he was elected to the National Academy of Sciences.

== Personal life ==
Dressler grew up in Iowa and studied anthropology with Doug Caulkins at Grinnell College, graduating in 1973. He received his PhD from the University of Connecticut in 1978, having studied there under Pertti J. ("Bert") Pelto.

== Career ==
Dressler conducted his dissertation fieldwork on the West Indian island of St. Lucia. This was an early contribution to a biocultural orientation in medical anthropology in that he examined how individual-level changes in social status related to economic development were associated with blood pressure. He won the Stirling Award in Culture and Personality Studies from the American Anthropological Association in 1979 for a paper based on this research.

When he arrived in Alabama in 1978, he began a long-term collaboration with the local African American community in research on health problems impacting that community, including high blood pressure and mild psychiatric disorder. Dressler's 1991 book Stress and Adaptation in the Context of Culture: Depression in a Southern Black Community summarized much of that work. It examined the complex ways that cultural, historical, psychological, and physiological factors can interact to shape health outcomes.

In the early 1980s Dressler also established a long-term relationship with researchers in Brazil, including José Ernesto dos Santos, Mauro C. Balieiro, and Rosane Pilot Pessa. Together, these investigators carried out five major projects over a thirty-year period, as well as a number of smaller studies, focused on the interaction of cultural, social, psychological, nutritional, and genetic influences on health. It was in the context of this research that Dressler developed the theory and method of cultural consonance as a means of locating individuals in the cultural space defined by shared cultural models.

Dressler describes cultural consonance as "the degree to which individuals, in their own beliefs and behaviors, approximate the prototypes for belief and behavior encoded in cultural models. Higher cultural consonance is associated with better health status (assessed psychologically, physiologically, immunologically, and morphologically). Cultural consonance expands on cultural consensus theory, a method from cognitive anthropology developed by Romney and others, in order to measure the content and impact of various culturally held beliefs or culturally shared experience. The concept of cultural consonance and the associated measurement model have also shed new light on some basic theoretical questions in anthropology regarding culture."

Dressler also contributed to the development of "residual agreement analysis,' a way of quantifying aspects of variation and non-agreement in culturally shared ideas.

He was president of the Society for Medical Anthropology (1999-2001) and member of the editorial boards of multiple anthropological journals. As of 2019, he has more than 120 publications indexed in Web of Science, which have been cited more than 2,600 times. Dressler's book Culture and the Individual: Theory and Method of Cultural Consonance won the annual book prize from the Society for Anthropological Sciences in 2019. His work was the subject of a retrospective panel at the 2019 joint meeting of the American Anthropological Association and the Canadian Anthropology Society/La Société Canadienne d'Anthropologie.

Also in 2019 he was selected to present in the "Last Lecture" series at the University of Alabama, and in 2021 he received the Conrad M. Arensberg Award from the American Anthropological Association for fresh and innovative contributions to anthropology as a natural science.

== Select publications ==
- Dressler, William W. (1991) Stress and Adaptation in the Context of Culture: Depression in a Southern Black Community Albany, NY: SUNY Press.
- Dressler, William W.; Bindon, JR (2000) "The health consequences of cultural consonance: Cultural dimensions of lifestyle, social support, and arterial blood pressure in an African American community." American Anthropologist, 102(2):244-260
- Dressler, William W. (2005) "What's Cultural about Biocultural Research?" Ethos 33 (1), 20–45
- Dressler, W.W.; Oths, K.S.; & Gravlee, C.C. (2005) "Race and ethnicity in public health research: models to explain health disparities" Annual Review of Anthropology, 34:231-252.
- Gravlee, Clarence C. and William W. Dressler. (2005) "Skin pigmentation, self-perceived color, and arterial blood pressure in Puerto Rico." American Journal of Human Biology 17: 195–206
- Dressler, William W. (2012) "Cultural consonance: Linking culture, the individual," Preventive Medicine, 55: 390–393.
- Dressler, William W. (2018) Culture and the Individual: Theory and Method of Cultural Consonance. New York: Routledge.
