= Biocultural anthropology =

Scientific exploration of the relationships between human biology and culture

Biocultural anthropology can be defined in numerous ways. It is the scientific exploration of the relationships between human biology and culture. "Instead of looking for the underlying biological roots of human behavior, biocultural anthropology attempts to understand how culture affects our biological capacities and limitations."

== History ==
Physical anthropologists throughout the first half of the 20th century viewed this relationship from a racial perspective; that is, from the assumption that typological human biological differences lead to cultural differences. After World War II the emphasis began to shift toward an effort to explore the role culture plays in shaping human biology. The shift towards understanding the role of culture to human biology led to the development of Dual inheritance theory in the 1960s. In relation to, and following the development of Dual-inheritance theory, biocultural evolution was introduced and first used in the 1970s.

== Key research ==
- Biocultural approaches to human biology have been utilized since at least 1958 when American Biological Anthropologist Frank B. Livingstone contributed early research explaining the linkages among population growth, subsistence strategy, and the distribution of the sickle cell gene in Liberia.
- Human adaptability research in the 1960s focused on two biocultural approaches to fatigue: functional differentiation of skeletal muscles associated with various movements, and human adaptability to modern living involving different work types.
- "What's Cultural about Biocultural Research," Written by William W. Dressler, connects the cultural perspective of biocultural anthropology to "cultural consonance" which is defined as "a model to assess the approximation of an individuals behavior compared to the guiding awareness of his or her culture. This research has been used to examine outcomes in blood pressure, depressive symptoms, body composition, and dietary habits.
- Dr. Romendro Khongsdier's approach to the study of human variation and evolution.
- "Building a New Biocultural Synthesis" by Alan H. Goodman and Thomas L. Leatherman.
- "New Directions in Biocultural Anthropology" edited by Molly Zuckerman and Debra Martin uses various case studies from around the world to understand how biocultural anthropology can be used to understand the relationship between biology and culture in both past and present populations.

== Contemporary biocultural anthropology ==
Biocultural methods focus on the interactions between humans and their environment to understand human biological adaptation and variation. Contemporary biocultural anthropologists view culture as having several key roles in human biological variation:

- Culture is a major human adaptation, permitting individuals and populations to adapt to widely varying local ecologies.
- Characteristic human biological or biobehavioral features, such as a large frontal cortex and intensive parenting compared to other primates, are viewed in part as an adaptation to the complex social relations created by culture.
- Culture shapes the political economy, thereby influencing what resources are available to individuals to feed and shelter themselves, protect themselves from disease, and otherwise maintain their health.
- Culture shapes the way people think about the world, altering their biology by influencing their behavior (e.g., food choice) or more directly through psychosomatic effects (e.g., the biological effects of psychological stress).

While biocultural anthropologists are found in many academic anthropology departments, usually as a minority of the faculty, certain departments have placed considerable emphasis on the "biocultural synthesis". Historically, this has included Emory University, the University of Alabama, UMass Amherst (especially in biocultural bioarchaeology) , and the University of Washington , each of which built Ph.D. programs around biocultural anthropology; Binghamton University, which has a M.S. program in biomedical anthropology; Oregon State University, University of Kentucky and others. Paul Baker, an anthropologist at Penn State whose work focused upon human adaptation to environmental variations, is credited with having popularized the concept of "biocultural" anthropology as a distinct subcategory of anthropology in general. Khongsdier argues that biocultural anthropology is the future of anthropology because it serves as a guiding force towards greater integration of the subdisciplines.

== Reception and criticism ==
Modern anthropologists, both biological and cultural, have criticized the biocultural synthesis, generally as part of a broader critique of "four-field holism" in U.S. anthropology (see anthropology main article). Typically such criticisms rest on the belief that biocultural anthropology imposes holism upon the biological and cultural subfields without adding value, or even destructively. For instance, contributors in the edited volume Unwrapping the Sacred Bundle: Reflections on the Disciplining of Anthropology argued that the biocultural synthesis, and anthropological holism more generally, are artifacts from 19th century social evolutionary thought that inappropriately impose scientific positivism upon cultural anthropology.

Some departments of anthropology have fully split, usually dividing scientific from humanistic anthropologists, such as Stanford's highly publicized 1998 division into departments of "Cultural and Social Anthropology" and "Anthropological Sciences". Underscoring the continuing controversy, this split is now being reversed over the objections of some faculty. Other departments, such as at Harvard, have distinct biological and sociocultural anthropology "wings" not designed to foster cross subdisciplinary interchange.

Biocultural research has shown to contain a few challenges to the researcher. "In general we are much more experienced in measuring the biological than the cultural. It is also difficult to precisely define what is meant by constructs such as socioeconomic status, poverty, rural, and urban. Operationalizing key variables so that they can be measured in ways that are enthnographically valid as well as replicable. Defining and measuring multiple causal pathways."

== See also ==
- Biocultural evolution
- Cultural neuroscience
- Evolutionary anthropology
- Sociocultural anthropology
