= History of the social sciences =

The history of the social sciences has its origins in the common stock of Western philosophy and shares various precursors, but began most intentionally in the early 18th century with the positivist philosophy of science. Since the mid-20th century, the term "social science" has come to refer more generally, not just to sociology but to all those disciplines which analyze society and culture, from anthropology to psychology to media studies.

The idea that society may be studied in a standardized and objective manner, with scholarly rules and methodology, is comparatively recent. Philosophers such as Confucius had long since theorised on topics such as social roles, the scientific analysis of human society is peculiar to the intellectual break away from the Age of Enlightenment and toward the discourses of Modernity. Social sciences came forth from the moral philosophy of the time and was influenced by the Age of Revolutions, such as the Industrial Revolution and the French Revolution. The beginnings of the social sciences in the 18th century are reflected in the grand encyclopedia of Diderot, with articles from Rousseau and other pioneers.

Around the start of the 20th century, Enlightenment philosophy was challenged in various quarters. After the use of classical theories since the end of the scientific revolution, various fields substituted mathematics studies for experimental studies and examining equations to build a theoretical structure. The development of social science subfields became very quantitative in methodology. Conversely, the interdisciplinary and cross-disciplinary nature of scientific inquiry into human behavior and social and environmental factors affecting it made many of the natural sciences interested in some aspects of social science methodology. Examples of boundary blurring include emerging disciplines like social studies of medicine, biocultural anthropology, neuropsychology, and the history and sociology of science. Increasingly, quantitative and qualitative methods are being integrated in the study of human action and its implications and consequences. In the first half of the 20th century, statistics became a free-standing discipline of applied mathematics. Statistical methods were used confidently.

In the contemporary period, there continues to be little movement toward consensus on what methodology might have the power and refinement to connect a proposed "grand theory" with the various midrange theories which, with considerable success, continue to provide usable frameworks for massive, growing data banks. See consilience.

== Timeframes ==
=== Antiquity ===
Plato's Republic is an influential treatise on political philosophy and the just life.

Aristotle published several works on social organization, such as his Politics, and Constitution of the Athenians.

=== Islamic developments ===
Significant contributions to the social sciences were made in Medieval Islamic civilization. Al-Biruni (973–1048) wrote detailed comparative studies on the anthropology of peoples, religions and cultures in the Middle East, Mediterranean and South Asia. Biruni has also been praised by several scholars for his Islamic anthropology.

Ibn Khaldun (1332–1406) worked in areas of demography, historiography, the philosophy of history, sociology, and economics. He is best known for his Muqaddimah.

=== Early modern ===
Near the Renaissance, which began around the 14th century, Jean Buridan and Nicole Oresme wrote on money. In the 15th century St. Atonine of Florence wrote of a comprehensive economic process. In the 16th century Leonard de Leys (Lessius), Juan de Lugo, and particularly Luis Molina wrote on economic topics. These writers focused on explaining property as something for "public good".

Representative figures of the 17th century include David Hartley, Hugo Grotius, Thomas Hobbes, John Locke, and Samuel von Putendorf. Thomas Hobbes argued that deductive reasoning from axioms created a scientific framework, and hence his Leviathan was a scientific description of a political commonwealth. In the 18th century, social science was called moral philosophy, as contrasted from natural philosophy and mathematics, and included the study of natural theology, natural ethics, natural jurisprudence, and policy ("police"), which included economics and finance ("revenue"). Pure philosophy, logic, literature, and history were outside these two categories. Adam Smith was a professor of moral philosophy, and he was taught by Francis Hutcheson. Figures of the time included François Quesnay, Jean-Jacques Rousseau, Giambattista Vico, William Godwin, Gabriel Bonnet de Mably, and Andre Morellet. The Encyclopédie of the time contained various works on the social sciences.

=== Late modern ===
This unity of science as descriptive remains, for example, in the time of Thomas Hobbes who argued that deductive reasoning from axioms created a scientific framework, and hence his Leviathan was a scientific description of a political commonwealth. What would happen within decades of his work was a revolution in what constituted "science", particularly the work of Isaac Newton in physics. Newton, by revolutionizing what was then called "natural philosophy", changed the basic framework by which individuals understood what was "scientific".

While he was merely the archetype of an accelerating trend, the important distinction is that for Newton, the mathematical flowed from a presumed reality independent of the observer, and working by its own rules. For philosophers of the same period, mathematical expression of philosophical ideals was taken to be symbolic of natural human relationships as well: the same laws moved physical and spiritual reality. For examples see Blaise Pascal, Gottfried Leibniz and Johannes Kepler, each of whom took mathematical examples as models for human behavior directly. In Pascal's case, the famous wager; for Leibniz, the invention of binary computation; and for Kepler, the intervention of angels to guide the planets.

In the realm of other disciplines, this created a pressure to express ideas in the form of mathematical relationships. Such relationships, called "Laws" after the usage of the time (see philosophy of science) became the model which other disciplines would emulate.

==== 19th century ====
The term "social science" was coined in French by Mirabeau in 1767, before becoming a distinct conceptual field in the nineteenth century. Auguste Comte (1797–1857) argued that ideas pass through three rising stages, theological, philosophical and scientific. He defined the difference as the first being rooted in assumption, the second in critical thinking, and the third in positive observation. This framework, still rejected by many, encapsulates the thinking which was to push economic study from being a descriptive to a mathematically based discipline. Karl Marx was one of the first writers to claim that his methods of research represented a scientific view of history in this model. With the late 19th century, attempts to apply equations to statements about human behavior became increasingly common. Among the first were the "Laws" of philology, which attempted to map the change over time of sounds in a language.

Sociology was established by Comte in 1838. He had earlier used the term "social physics", but that had subsequently been appropriated by others, most notably the Belgian statistician Adolphe Quetelet. Comte endeavoured to unify history, psychology and economics through the scientific understanding of the social realm. Writing shortly after the malaise of the French Revolution, he proposed that social ills could be remedied through sociological positivism, an epistemological approach outlined in The Course in Positive Philosophy [1830–1842] and A General View of Positivism (1844). Comte believed a positivist stage would mark the final era, after conjectural theological and metaphysical phases, in the progression of human understanding.

It was with the work of Charles Darwin that the descriptive version of social theory received another shock. Biology had, seemingly, resisted mathematical study, and yet the theory of natural selection and the implied idea of genetic inheritance—later found to have been enunciated by Gregor Mendel, seemed to point in the direction of a scientific biology based, like physics, chemistry, astronomy, and Earth science on mathematical relationships. The first thinkers to attempt to combine inquiry of the type they saw in Darwin with exploration of human relationships, which, evolutionary theory implied, would be based on selective forces, were Freud in Austria and William James in the United States. Freud's theory of the functioning of the mind, and James' work on experimental psychology would have enormous impact on those that followed. Freud, in particular, created a framework which would appeal not only to those studying psychology, but artists and writers as well.

Though Comte is generally regarded as the "Father of Sociology", the discipline was formally established by another French thinker, Émile Durkheim (1858–1917), who developed positivism in greater detail. Durkheim set up the first European department of sociology at the University of Bordeaux in 1895, publishing his Rules of the Sociological Method. In 1896, he established the journal L'Année Sociologique. Durkheim's seminal monograph, Suicide (1897), a case study of suicide rates among Catholic and Protestant populations, distinguished sociological analysis from psychology or philosophy. It also marked a major contribution to the concept of structural functionalism.

Today, Durkheim, Marx and Max Weber are typically cited as the three principal architects of social science in the science of society sense of the term. "Social science", however, has since become an umbrella term to describe all those disciplines, outside of physical science and art, which analyse human societies.

==== 20th century ====
In the first half of the 20th century, statistics became a free-standing discipline of applied mathematics. Statistical methods were used confidently, for example in an increasingly statistical view of biology.

The first thinkers to attempt to combine inquiry of the type they saw in Darwin with exploration of human relationships, which, evolutionary theory implied, would be based on selective forces, were Freud in Austria and William James in the United States. Freud's theory of the functioning of the mind, and James' work on experimental psychology would have enormous impact on those that followed. Freud, in particular, created a framework which would appeal not only to those studying psychology, but artists and writers as well.

One of the most persuasive advocates for the view of scientific treatment of philosophy would be John Dewey (1859–1952). He began, as Marx did, in an attempt to weld Hegelian idealism and logic to experimental science, for example in his Psychology of 1887. However, he abandoned Hegelian constructs. Influenced by both Charles Sanders Peirce and William James, he joined the movement in America called pragmatism. He then formulated his basic doctrine, enunciated in essays such as "The Influence of Darwin on Philosophy" (1910).

This idea, based on his theory of how organisms respond, states that there are three phases to the process of inquiry:

1. Problematic Situation, where the typical response is inadequate.
2. Isolation of Data or subject matter.
3. Reflective, which is tested empirically.

With the rise of the idea of quantitative measurement in the physical sciences, for example Lord Rutherford's famous maxim that any knowledge that one cannot measure numerically "is a poor sort of knowledge", the stage was set for the conception of the humanities as being precursors to "social science".

In 1924, prominent social scientists established the Pi Gamma Mu honor society for the social sciences. Among its key objectives were to promote interdisciplinary cooperation and develop an integrated theory of human personality and organization. Toward these ends, a journal for interdisciplinary scholarship in the various social sciences and lectureship grants were established.

==== Interwar period ====
Theodore Porter argued in The Rise of Statistical Thinking that the effort to provide a synthetic social science is a matter of both administration and discovery combined, and that the rise of social science was, therefore, marked by both pragmatic needs as much as by theoretical purity. An example of this is the rise of the concept of Intelligence Quotient, or IQ. It is unclear precisely what is being measured by IQ, but the measurement is useful in that it predicts success in various endeavors.

The rise of industrialism had created a series of social science, economic, and political problems, particularly in managing supply and demand in their political economy, the management of resources for military and developmental use, the creation of mass education systems to train individuals in symbolic reasoning and problems in managing the effects of industrialization itself. The perceived senselessness of the "Great War" as it was then called, of 1914–18, now called World War I, based in what were perceived to be "emotional" and "irrational" decisions, provided an immediate impetus for a form of decision making that was more "scientific" and easier to manage. Simply put, to manage the new multi-national enterprises, private and governmental, required more data. More data required a means of reducing it to information upon which to make decisions. Numbers and charts could be interpreted more quickly and moved more efficiently than long texts. Conversely, the interdisciplinary and cross-disciplinary nature of scientific inquiry into human behavior and social and environmental factors affecting it have made many of the so-called hard sciences dependent on social science methodology. Examples of boundary blurring include emerging disciplines like social studies of medicine, neuropsychology, biocultural anthropology, and the history and sociology of science. Increasingly, quantitative and qualitative methods are being integrated in the study of human action and its implications and consequences.

In the 1930s this new model of managing decision making became cemented with the New Deal in the US, and in Europe with the increasing need to manage industrial production and governmental affairs. Institutions such as The New School for Social Research, International Institute of Social History, and departments of "social research" at prestigious universities were meant to fill the growing demand for individuals who could quantify human interactions and produce models for decision making on this basis.

Coupled with this pragmatic need was the belief that the clarity and simplicity of mathematical expression avoided systematic errors of holistic thinking and logic rooted in traditional argument. This trend, part of the larger movement known as modernism provided the rhetorical edge for the expansion of social sciences.

=== Contemporary developments ===
There continues to be little movement toward consensus on what methodology might have the power and refinement to connect a proposed "grand theory" with the various midrange theories which, with considerable success, continue to provide usable frameworks for massive, growing data banks (see consilience). Midrange theories can support the emergence of new disciplinary thinking and act as a "critical step" towards formulation of a more comprehensive theory. Philosopher Nancy Cartwright notes that the space which midrange (or middle-range) theory occupies is the space between abstraction, where principles are derived from specific examples, and generalisation, and that developments in this space often relate to "things that come under the label 'mechanism'". In a field such as nursing, she has suggested that middle-range theory is "the only game in town".

== See also ==
- Historiography, the study of the methodologies utilized by historians
  - History of archaeology
  - History of anthropology
  - History of linguistics
  - History of psychology
  - History of sociology
- Outline of social science
