= Willy Oskar Dressler =

German writer (1876–1954)

Willy Oskar Dressler (25 April 1876 – 7 November 1954) was a German writer on art and interior decoration. He was born in Berlin and died in Endeholz, Scharnhorst, Lower Saxony.

His principal works are:

- Möbel im Zimmer der Neuzeit (1901)
- Moderne Silbergeräte (1902)
- Geschichte des Porzellans (1904)
- Kunstgewerbe oder angewandte Kunst in Beziehung zur künstlerischen Kultur (1910)
- Neugestaltung der Verwaltung der Kunstangelegenheiten im Reich und in den Bundesstaaten (1917)
- Der Eckstein in der Wirtschaft von den Werkleuten vergessen! (1921)
