= Chinese Whispers =

Chinese whispers is a game in which a line of players whisper a message from one to another.

Chinese Whispers or Chinese whispers may also refer to:

== Books ==
- Chinese Whispers (novella), a 1987 novella by Maurice Leitch
- Chinese Whispers (Ashbery book), a 2002 poetry collection by John Ashbery
- Chinese Whispers: The True Story Behind Britain's Hidden Army of Labour, a 2008 book by Hsiao-Hung Pai

== Television ==
- Chinese Whispers (1989 film), a 1989 British television film dramatisation of the novella by Maurice Leitch in the anthology series ScreenPlay

== Music ==
=== Albums ===
- Chinese Whispers, by Greg Johnson, or the title track (1997)
- Chinese Whispers, by Full Flava, or the title track (2000)

=== Songs ===
- "Chinese Whispers", by The Alan Parsons Project from Stereotomy (1985)
- "Chinese Whispers", by Alchemist from Spiritech (1997)
- "Chinese Whispers", by Angel from Believe in Angels... Believe in Me (2004)
- "Chinese Whispers", by Brett Anderson from Wilderness (2008)
- "Chinese Whispers", by Creepmime (1993)
- "Chinese Whispers", by Go West from Dancing on the Couch (1987)
- "Chinese Whispers", by Jessica Mauboy from Been Waiting (2008)
- "Chinese Whispers", by New Model Army from Thunder and Consolation (1989)
- "Chinese Whispers", by Scooter from We Bring the Noise! (2001)
- "Chinese Whispers", by The Dillinger Escape Plan from Option Paralysis (2010)
- "Chinese Whispers", by The Future Sound of London/Amorphous Androgynous from The Isness (2002)
- "Chinese Whispers", by Tinpan Orange from The Bottom of the Lake (2009)
- "Chinese Whispers", by Yellow Magic Orchestra from Service (1983)

=== Other ===
- Chinese Whispers (Waterhouse), a 2010 composition for string quartet by Graham Waterhouse

== Other uses ==
- Chinese whispers (clustering method), in network science
