= Expulsion (education) =

Removal of a student from a school

Expulsion, also known as dismissal, withdrawal, or permanent exclusion (British English), is the permanent removal or banning of a student from a school, school district, college, university, or TAFE due to persistent violation of that institution's rules, or in extreme cases, for a single offense of marked severity. Colloquialisms for expulsion include being "kicked out of school", "expelled", or "sent down". Laws and procedures regarding expulsion vary between countries and states.

The practice of pressuring parents to voluntarily withdraw their child from an educational institution, termed off-rolling in the UK, is comparable to expulsion. Rates of expulsion may be especially high for students of color, even when their behavioral infractions are the same as those of white children. Certain disabilities, such as autism and ADHD, also increase the risk of expulsion, despite the fact that this could constitute unlawful discrimination in many jurisdictions.

== By country ==
=== Ireland ===
In Ireland, a school must notify the local Educational Welfare Officer before expelling a student; they will then try and find a solution. The student cannot be expelled until twenty days after the educational welfare officer has been notified. Under Section 29 of the Education Act 1998 an expelled child's parent(s) may appeal an expulsion to the Secretary General of the Department of Education. The Child and Family Agency (Tusla) may also appeal an expulsion. If the department upholds the expulsion, a further appeal can be brought to the High Court.

In 2017–18, 29 primary school pupils were expelled in Ireland, up from 18 the previous year. In 2015–16, 195 secondary school students were expelled.

=== New Zealand ===
In New Zealand, exclusion and expulsion are methods for removing a student from a school for misconduct. Both are governed by sections 13 to 19 of the Education Act 1989, and the Education Stand Down, Suspension, Exclusion, and Expulsion Rules 1999.

The difference between exclusion and expulsion is that students aged under 16 are excluded, while students aged 16 and over are expelled. For students excluded, because they are under the minimum school leaving age, the excluding school is required to find an alternative school for the student to attend, or reinstate the student if another school cannot be found. For students that are expelled, the expelling school is not required to find an alternative school, as the student is over the minimum school leaving age.

Exclusion/expulsion cannot be directly done by the principal. It must be done through suspending the student, and requiring the school's board of trustees, or a standing disciplinary committee of the board, to independently assess whether or not the situation is serious enough to justify exclusion or expulsion of the student.

In 2009, exclusions and expulsions rates were 2.41 and 2.01 per thousand students respectively. Students were more likely to be excluded or expelled if they were male, of Maori or Pacific Island descent, and/or attended a school with a low (1–4) socioeconomic decile. The most common reasons for exclusions and expulsions in 2009 were:

- Continual disobedience – 41.2% of exclusions/25.3% of expulsions
- Drugs incl. substance abuse – 14.2%/25.8%
- Physical assault on other students – 17.3%/16.8%
- Theft – 4.4%/8.9%
- Verbal assault on staff – 5.0%/2.6%
- Physical assault on staff – 4.5%/1.6%
- Weapons – 2.5%/2.6%
- Vandalism – 1.3%/2.6%
- Alcohol – 1.0%/3.7%
- Verbal assault on other students – 1.1%/0.5%

Arson, sexual harassment, sexual misconduct, and smoking were the other main reasons for exclusion and expulsion recorded.

Reasons for exclusions in 2009
1. Continual disobedience (41.2%)
2. Drugs incl. substance abuse (14.2%)
3. Physical assault on other students (17.3%)
4. Theft (4.40%)
5. Verbal assault on staff (5.00%)
6. Physical assault on staff (4.50%)
7. Weapons (2.50%)
8. Vandalism (1.30%)
9. Alcohol (1.00%)
10. Verbal assault on other students (1.10%)
Reasons for expulsions in 2009
1. Continual disobedience (25.3%)
2. Drugs incl. substance abuse (25.8%)
3. Physical assault on other students (16.8%)
4. Theft (8.90%)
5. Verbal assault on staff (2.60%)
6. Physical assault on staff (1.60%)
7. Weapons (2.60%)
8. Vandalism (2.60%)
9. Alcohol (3.70%)
10. Verbal assault on other students (0.50%)

=== England ===
==== State sector ====
If a student has been expelled from two schools, then any state school is legally allowed to refuse admittance of that student. Schools on special measures may refuse to admit a student who has been expelled from only one school. Therefore, a student who has been expelled from two schools might be totally removed from the state education system. As a result, it is rare for a pupil to be expelled or permanently excluded in the UK's state sector.

The exclusion of pupils is governed by the Education Act 2002.

The Secretary of State's guidance states that exclusion is a serious step. Exclusion should be used only in response to serious breaches of a school's discipline policy and only after a range of alternative strategies to resolve the pupil's disciplinary problems have been tried and proven to have failed and where allowing the pupil to remain in school would be seriously detrimental to the education or welfare of other pupils and staff, or of the pupil himself or herself.

In practice, a student can usually be subject to permanent exclusion for a total of five disciplinary breaches, for which the student does not have to receive formal warnings. Depending on their offence, a child can be excluded from the school system within any range of time after their misdeed. Though the teaching staff may recommend a pupil to be expelled, only the headteacher is legally empowered to exclude a student; he or she is not permitted to delegate that power to another person, but if he or she is ill or otherwise unable to perform their duties, another staff member may become the acting headteacher and inherit the power to expel students.

When excluding a student, the headteacher must inform the pupil's parents of the duration of the exclusion whether it be temporary or permanent, reasons for exclusion, and the procedures which a parent may take to make an appeal. The headteacher must also inform the local education authority of the circumstances surrounding permanent exclusions, fixed term exclusions exceeding five days, and exclusions which result in a student being unable to take a public examination.

===== Reasons for permanent exclusion =====
A headteacher might expel a student out for a first or one-off incident of appropriate severity. For a single case of one of the following, a pupil can be permanently excluded for:

- A serious act of violence, including actual or threatened violence against a staff member or another student
- Possession of a weapon or any other hazardous item
- A sexual offence, including sexual abuse and assault
- A racially-aggravated offence
- Severe hazing of another student
- A drug offence, usually the supply of a controlled drug to other pupils. Possession of a small amount of a soft drug such as tobacco or cannabis is not normally considered sufficient grounds for expulsion
- Computer hacking

If a student has previous disciplinary records of violating other school rules and regulations, that could also result in expulsion. In these cases, expulsion is used as a final resort if the student has shown no signs of improvement in their behaviour despite disciplinary measures, and has failed to respond to a final warning. Some offences which may result in expulsion when repeated persistently include, but is not limited to:

- Defiance and rebellion against authority
- Vandalism
- Bullying
- Lying
- Cheating (including Plagiarism)
- Stealing
- Harassment
- False alarm, deliberately setting off a fire alarm when there is no fire, or prank calling 999 (the British emergency telephone number)
- Gambling
- Terroristic threat
- Discrimination

Pupils who have done nothing wrong to merit expulsion are sometimes expelled if the school does not expect them to achieve sufficiently high grades in external examinations. This illegal policy is known as "off-rolling", and seriously harms the life chances of young people.

===== Appeals =====
The pupil and their parents can appeal to the school governors against the expulsion. If the appeal fails to reinstate the pupil, a further appeal can be made to an appeals board which sits on the behalf of the local education authority.

====== Appeals to the governors ======
The parents of an excluded pupil are entitled to appeal against expulsion or an exclusion exceeding five days to a panel of school governors acting as a court.

The panel, which consists of parents and staff and cannot include the headteacher, is not legally able to exclude a pupil or extend a term of exclusion; but it can convert a permanent exclusion to a fixed term one, reduce the length of a fixed-term exclusion, or cancel an exclusion.

The appeal must occur no sooner than six days after and no more than 15 days after the exclusion begins. The panel considers oral, written, or physical evidence from the school detailing the case for expulsion, and from the parents of the excluded pupil. The pupil and their parents may argue that the excluded pupil was not responsible for the act for which they have been excluded, or that the punishment was disproportionate to the offence.

====== Appeal to the local education authority ======
If the appeal to the governors is unsuccessful, an expelled or excluded student and their parents may go to an appeals board. This panel, which is appointed by the local education authority, must be autonomous of the authority, the school, and the parents of the excluded student.

The majority of the appeals that these panels hear are not against exclusions, but are for the admission of pupils into schools. Although the local education authority are in theory obligated to provide education to a pupil under school leaving age Year 11 and below, in practice usually when the pupil is denied access to other schools or the pupil referral unit the local education authority employs techniques such as appointing a single tutor for one lesson a week.

===== Legal advice and representation =====
There are a number of projects that provide free legal representation to pupils who are appealing against their permanent exclusions from school. The institution cited in letters detailing the reasons for permanent exclusions is the Coram Children's Legal Centre.

There are voluntary groups who provide trainee lawyers to represent parents at both governing body appeals and independent appeal panels. The City School Exclusion Service (CitySES) is one such project.

==== Independent sector ====
In the independent sector, a pupil may be permanently excluded at the discretion of the headteacher.

===== Distinction between expulsion and rustication =====
Whereas expulsion from a UK independent school means permanent removal from the school, rustication or suspension usually means removal from the school for a set period, for example, the remainder of the current term.

Managed moves

In 1999, protocols were introduced to reduce the amount of permanent exclusions every year. This involved a process called a 'managed move' where schools had the option to transfer a student to another school without a permanent exclusion being written on their record. It is usually done on a trial basis where the child can spend 6 to 16 weeks at the new school before integrating. If nothing occurs in between the trial period, the managed move is considered successful.

==== University of Oxford ====
Historically, bannimus (Latin: "we banish") was the form of expulsion of any individual from the University of Oxford, by putting the proctorial edict up in some public place, as a denunciation or promulgation of it. It also served to prevent the individual from claiming the cause of expulsion was unknown. Rustication, that is, when a student is sent down or banished from the university for a period of time before being allowed to return and further their education, is more common. The term bannimus is related to bannition, which is the general expulsion of an individual from a university.

=== United States ===
==== Expulsion in general ====
In the United States, expulsion criteria and process vary from state to state. Depending on local school board jurisdiction, approval from that school's local school board may be required before a student can be expelled, as opposed to a suspension, which may require approval from the principal or a school board member, including the superintendent. Students who have been expelled from the school face numerous restrictions, in which they are no longer eligible to attend or visit the school. Like an out-of-school suspension, students who breach an expulsion, which includes visiting the school they have been expelled from, or perform or attend any activity with any students or staff who are active with the school, will be arrested for, and charged with trespassing. Students are usually not expelled for academic violations such as plagiarism that would be punishable in college. However, in some jurisdictions such as California, vulgarity which is not defined anywhere within California law is enough of a reason for a student to be expelled from any school. (Note: California statute has been indirectly invalidated by the Supreme Court in FCC v. Fox Television Stations, Inc. (2012).)

==== Pupil rights ====
While in the Criminal or Juvenile Justice one has enumerated and unenumerated rights upon accusation, pupils do not have such rights when within an expulsion process. For example, in California, pupils have the following rights:

- Have an expulsion hearing within 30 school days
- To appeal the results of an expulsion hearing
- To remain silent

However, there are rights that pupils do not have during the expulsion process that they would have in a court of law:

- An attorney at no cost to the pupil
- To cross examine any witness
- For the hearing to be heard by an independent party
- The presumption of innocence
- To be found guilty only when the consensus is beyond a reasonable doubt
- Protection from double jeopardy

==== Expulsion rates ====
A 2001 report from Justice Policy Institute showed that expulsions nearly doubled from 1974 to 1998 despite student victimization rates remaining stable. Beginning with the Gun-Free School Zones Act, and following the Columbine shooting tragedy, schools have become increasingly willing to suspend or have expelled students for minor behavior offenses. For example, in Maryland during the 2006–2007 school year, while 2% of suspensions were for weapons, 37% were for disrespect, insubordination, or disruption. The Task Force on the Education of Maryland's American Males noted that high suspension and expulsion rates do little more than increase court referrals for minor misbehavior, and those actions put a child on the path toward delinquency or accelerates his journey there. These policies are more generally known as zero tolerance.

Students who have been expelled from a building in primary and secondary schools are given an option to attend class at an alternate location. Alternative schools are usually owned by the expelling school district for expelled students to have the option to attend daily lessons. Students have other options, such as homeschooling, boarding schools, private schools, and online courses, such as APEX or K-12. In some states, such as Wisconsin, other public school districts are not required to enroll students who are currently serving a term of expulsion. In some cases, such as permanent expulsion from a district, this type of statutory authority can have the effect of displacing an expelled student from the public education system of an entire state, effectively ending their educational career. When it comes to student discipline, there is a marked difference in procedure between public and private institutions. With public schools, the school must provide the student with constitutional due process protections as public educational institutions operate as an extension of state governments. With private schools, on the other hand, the student can be expelled for any reason so long as the expulsion was not "arbitrary and capricious". Generally, as long as a private school follows the procedures in its student handbook, a court will not view its actions as arbitrary and capricious.

Some states, like Texas, report expulsion to the juvenile court system - the model in Texas was passed in 1995.

== Notable expellees ==
Many celebrities claim to have been expelled from school; however, some may be exaggerating in order to portray a rebellious image, and they may merely have voluntarily withdrawn from a school rather than being formally expelled:

- Banksy claimed to have been expelled, but as his identity is not public knowledge this cannot be confirmed.
- Cheryl is another; some articles say she was expelled from school twice, others that she was merely suspended twice.
- It is sometimes claimed that Willem Dafoe was expelled from Appleton East High School for making pornography, although he actually dropped out when a film he was editing containing nudity was found in the school AV room.
- Amy Winehouse claimed that she was expelled from the Sylvia Young Theatre School, but this was refuted by her old school and by her father.
- Mark Zuckerberg was almost expelled from Harvard University while creating Facebook's prototype, FaceMash.com. He was charged with breach of security, violating copyrights, violating individual privacy, and a violation of university policy on distribution of digitized images. However, those charges were ultimately dropped.

Actual expellees include:

- 50 Cent (Curtis Jackson), expelled from Andrew Jackson High School for cocaine possession
- Ceawlin Thynn, 8th Marquess of Bath, expelled from Bedales School for smoking cannabis.
- Marc Bolan, expelled from Northwold Primary School for headbutting the deputy headmaster due to a caning
- Jon Bon Jovi, expelled for hitting a female classmate
- Liam Brady; claimed to have been expelled for missing a school Gaelic football match to play a schoolboy soccer international, but his school denied this
- Marlon Brando, expelled from Libertyville High School for riding his motorcycle through the corridors
- Jackie Collins, expelled from Francis Holland School for truancy and smoking; she then threw her school uniform into the Thames
- Dizzee Rascal expelled from four schools and semi-expelled from a fifth school (allowed to attend for music program) for "fighting with teachers, stealing cars, and robbing pizza delivery men"
- Laurence Fox, expelled from Harrow after an "indiscretion" with a girl at a sixth-form ball.
- Stephen Fry, expelled from Uppingham School for poor grades, perpetual mischief and credit card fraud
- Cary Grant, got himself expelled from Fairfield Grammar School deliberately so that he could become an actor
- Lewis Hamilton, wrongly excluded from The John Henry Newman School when he was identified as being among a group of boys that attacked a fellow student; he appealed and was re-admitted
- Max Irons, expelled from Bryanston School for having sex with another student.
- Salma Hayek, expelled from boarding school for playing pranks and dyslexia
- Jade Jagger, expelled from St Mary's School, Calne for climbing out of a window to meet a boyfriend.
- Courtney Love, claimed to have been expelled from Nelson College for Girls for truancy and smoking
- Robert Pattinson, expelled from Tower House School for shoplifting and reselling pornographic magazines at school
- Keanu Reeves, expelled from the Etobicoke School of the Arts for perpetual rowdiness and backtalking
- Guy Ritchie, expelled from Stanbridge Earls School for drug use, truancy and fraternizing with a girl
- John Lydon, expelled for refusing to cut hair and for his antisocial behaviour
- Noel Gallagher, expelled from The Barlow Roman Catholic High School for throwing a bag of flour at a teacher
- Charlie Sheen, expelled from Santa Monica High School for truancy and poor grades
- Frank Sinatra, expelled from A. J. Demarest High School for "general rowdiness"
- Snoop Dogg (Calvin Broadus), claimed to have been expelled from Cleveland Elementary School for gifted children for exposing genitals to a female pupil
- Owen Wilson, expelled from the elite prep school St. Mark's School of Texas for cheating on a test
- Benjamin Zephaniah, expelled from Broadway Academy for dyslexia

== See also ==
- Dishonorable discharge
- Rustication (academia)
