= Benjamin Zephaniah =

British poet and author (1958–2023)

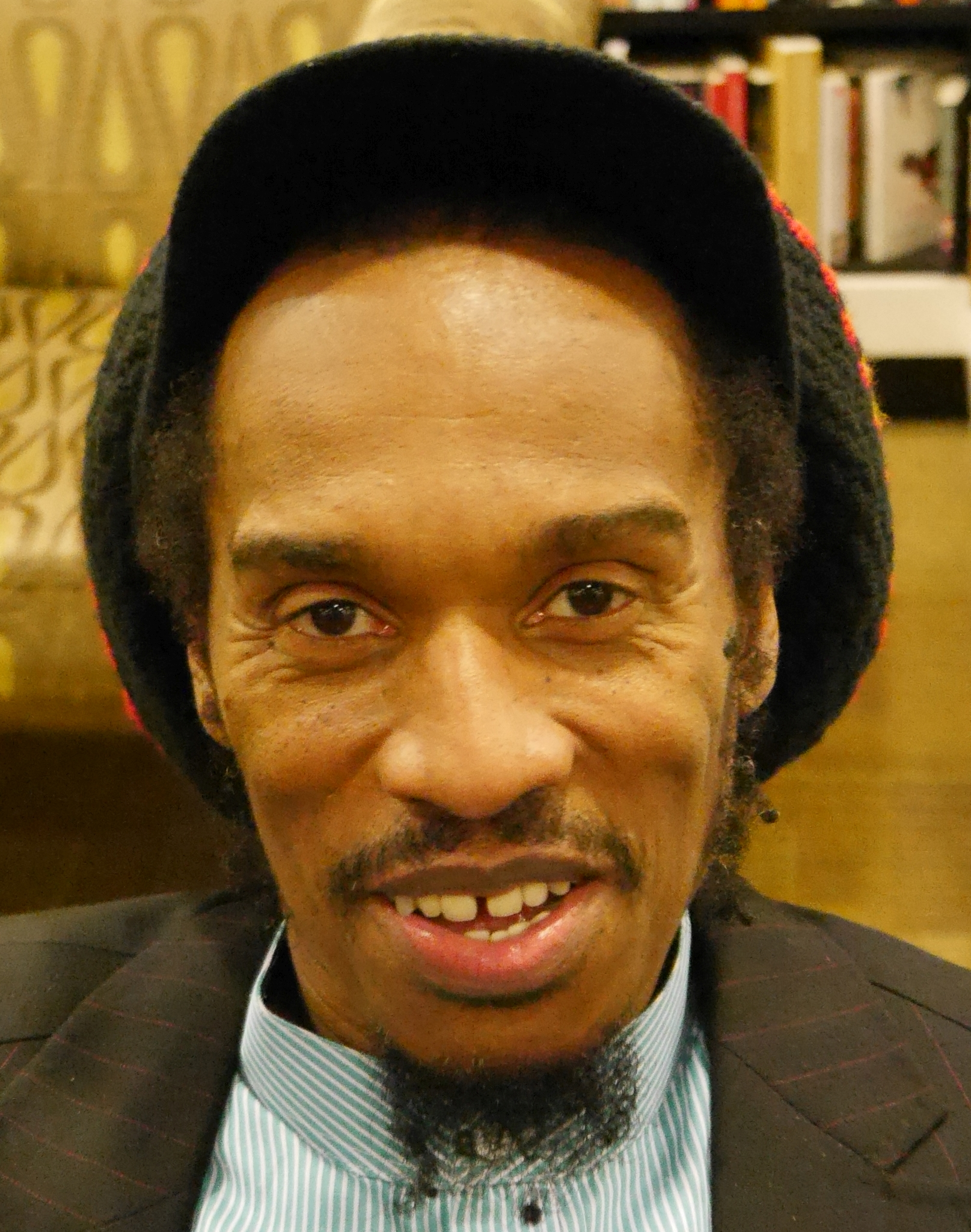
- Zephaniah in 2018
- Born: Benjamin Springer; 15 April 1958; Handsworth, Birmingham, England
- Died: 7 December 2023 (aged 65)
- Occupations: Poet; playwright; author; actor
- Spouses: Amina (m. 1990; div. 2001); Qian Zheng (m. 2017)
- Writing career
- Years active: 1980–2023
- Genres: Poetry; teen fiction
- Movements: Rastafari movement; postcolonialism; postmodernism
- Benjamin Zephaniah's voice Zephaniah talking about generational views of music and technology
- Website: benjaminzephaniah.com

Zephaniah reciting a poem in 2015

Benjamin Obadiah Iqbal Zephaniah (15 April 1958 – 7 December 2023) was a British writer, dub poet, actor, musician and professor of poetry and creative writing. Over his lifetime, he was awarded 20 honorary doctorates in recognition of his contributions to literature, education, and the arts. He was included in The Times list of Britain's top 50 post-war writers in 2008. In his work, Zephaniah drew on his lived experiences of incarceration, racism and his Jamaican heritage.

He won the BBC Radio 4 Young Playwrights Festival Award in 1998 and was the recipient of at least sixteen honorary doctorates. A ward at Ealing Hospital was also named in his honour. His second novel, Refugee Boy, was the recipient of the 2002 Portsmouth Book Award in the Longer Novel category. In 1982, he released an album, Rasta, which featured the Wailers performing for the first time since the death of Bob Marley, acting as a tribute to Nelson Mandela. It topped the charts in Yugoslavia, and due to its success Mandela invited Zephaniah to host the president's Two Nations Concert at the Royal Albert Hall, London, in 1996. As an actor, he had a major role in the BBC's Peaky Blinders between 2013 and 2022.

A vegan and animal rights activist, as well as an anarchist, Zephaniah supported changing the British electoral system from first-past-the-post to alternative vote. In 2003, Zephaniah was offered appointment as an Officer of the Order of the British Empire (OBE). He publicly rejected the honour, stating: "I get angry when I hear that word 'empire'; it reminds me of slavery, it reminds of thousands of years of brutality, it reminds me of how my foremothers were raped and my forefathers, brutalised."

== Early life ==
Benjamin Springer was born on 15 April 1958, in the Handsworth district of Birmingham, England, where he was also raised. He referred to this area as the "Jamaican capital of Europe". The son of parents who had migrated from the Caribbean – Oswald Springer, a Barbadian postman, and Leneve (née Honeyghan), a Jamaican nurse who came to Britain in 1956 and worked for the National Health Service – he had a total of seven younger siblings, including his twin sister, Velda.

Zephaniah wrote that he was strongly influenced by the music and poetry of Jamaica and what he called "street politics", and he said in a 2005 interview:

Well, for most of the early part of my life I thought poetry was an oral thing. We used to listen to tapes from Jamaica of Louise Bennett, who we think of as the queen of all dub poets. For me, it was two things: it was words wanting to say something and words creating rhythm. Written poetry was a very strange thing that white people did.

His first performance was in church when he was 11 years old, resulting in him adopting the name Zephaniah (after the biblical prophet), and by the age of 15, his poetry was already known among Handsworth's Afro-Caribbean and Asian communities.

He was educated at Broadway School, Birmingham, from which he was expelled aged 13, unable to read or write due to dyslexia. He was sent to Boreatton Park approved school in Baschurch, Shropshire.

The gift, during his childhood, of an old, manual typewriter inspired him to become a writer. It is now in the collection of Birmingham Museums Trust.

As a youth, he spent time in borstal and in his late teens received a criminal record and served a prison sentence for burglary. Tired of the limitations of being a black poet communicating with black people only, he decided to expand his audience, and in 1979, at the age of 22, he headed to London, where his first book would be published the next year.

While living in London, Zephaniah was assaulted during the 1981 Brixton riots and chronicled his experiences on his 1982 album Rasta. He experienced racism on a regular basis:

They happened around me. Back then, racism was very in your face. There was the National Front against black and foreign people, and the police were also very racist. I got stopped four times after I bought a BMW when I became successful with poetry. I kept getting stopped by the police, so I sold it.

In a session with John Peel on 1 February 1983 – one of two Peel sessions he recorded that year – Zephaniah's responses were recorded in such poems as "Dis Policeman", "The Boat", "Riot in Progress" and "Uprising Downtown".

== Written work and poetry ==
Zephaniah performing in 2011

Having moved to London, Zephaniah became actively involved in a workers' co-operative in Stratford, which led to the publication of his first book of poetry, Pen Rhythm (Page One Books, 1980). He had earlier been turned down by other publishers who did not believe there would be an audience for his work, and "they didn't understand it because it was supposed to be performed". Three editions of Pen Rhythm were published. Zephaniah said that his mission was to fight the dead image of poetry in academia, and to "take [it] everywhere" to people who do not read books, so he turned poetry readings into concert-like performances, sometimes with The Benjamin Zephaniah Band.

His second collection of poetry, The Dread Affair: Collected Poems (1985), contained a number of poems attacking the British legal system. Rasta Time in Palestine (1990), an account of a visit to the Palestinian occupied territories, contained poetry and travelogue.

Zephaniah was poet-in-residence at the chambers of Michael Mansfield QC, and sat in on the inquiry into Bloody Sunday and other cases, these experiences led to his Too Black, Too Strong poetry collection (2001). We Are Britain! (2002) is a collection of poems celebrating cultural diversity in Britain.

He published several collections of poems, as well as novels, specifically for young people. Talking Turkeys (1994), his first poetry book for children, was reprinted after six weeks. In 1999, he wrote his first novel Face – a story of "facial discrimination", as he described it – which was intended for teenagers, and sold some 66,000 copies. Poet Raymond Antrobus, who was given the novel when he had just started attending a deaf school, has written: "I remember reading the whole thing in one go. I was very self-conscious about wearing hearing aids and I needed stories that humanised disability, as Face did. I was still struggling with my literacy at the time, and I understood Benjamin as someone who was self-taught and had been marginalised within the education system. And so he really felt like an ambassador for young people like me."

Zephaniah's second novel Refugee Boy, about a 14-year-old refugee from Ethiopia and Eritrea, was published in August 2001. It was the recipient of the 2002 Portsmouth Book Award in the Longer Novel category, and went on to sell 88,000 copies. In 2013, Refugee Boy was adapted as a play by Zephaniah's long-time friend Lemn Sissay, staged at the West Yorkshire Playhouse.

In May 2011, Zephaniah accepted a year-long position as poet-in-residence at Keats House in Hampstead, London, his first residency role for more than ten years. In accepting the role, he commented: "I don't do residencies, but Keats is different. He's a one-off, and he has always been one of my favourite poets." The same year, he was appointed professor of poetry and creative writing at Brunel University London.

In 2016, Zephaniah wrote the foreword to Angry White People: Coming Face-to-Face with the British Far Right by Hsiao-Hung Pai.

Zephaniah's frank autobiography, The Life and Rhymes of Benjamin Zephaniah, was published to coincide with his 60th birthday in 2018, when BBC Sounds broadcast him reading his own text. "I'm still as angry as I was in my twenties," he said. The book was nominated as "autobiography of the year" at the National Book Awards.

The Birmingham Mail dubbed him "The people's laureate".

On the publication of his young adult novel Windrush Child in 2020, Zephaniah was outspoken about the importance of the way history is represented in the curriculum of schools.

== Acting and media appearances ==
Zephaniah made minor appearances in several television programmes in the 1980s and 1990s, including The Comic Strip Presents... (1988), EastEnders (1993), The Bill (1994), and Crucial Tales (1996). In 1990, he appeared in the film Farendj, directed by Sabine Prenczina and starring Tim Roth.

He was the "castaway" on the 8 June 1997 episode of the BBC Radio 4 programme Desert Island Discs, where his chosen book was the Poetical Works of Shelley.

In 2005, BBC One broadcast a television documentary about his life, A Picture of Birmingham, by Benjamin Zephaniah, which was repeated by BBC Two on 7 December 2023.

In December 2012, he was guest editor of an episode of the BBC Radio 4 programme Today, for which he commissioned a "good news bulletin".

Between 2013 and 2022, Zephaniah played the role of preacher Jeremiah "Jimmy" Jesus in BBC television drama Peaky Blinders, appearing in 14 episodes across the six series.

In 2020, he appeared as a panellist on the BBC television comedy quiz show QI, on the episode "Roaming".

== Music ==
In 1982, Zephaniah released the album Rasta, which featured the Wailers' first recording since the death of Bob Marley as well as a tribute to the political prisoner (later to become South African president) Nelson Mandela. The album gained Zephaniah international prestige and topped the Yugoslavian pop charts. It was because of this recording that he was introduced to Mandela, and in 1996, Mandela requested that Zephaniah host the president's Two Nations Concert at the Royal Albert Hall, London.

Zephaniah released a total of seven albums of original music.

== Views ==
Zephaniah was connected with – and served as patron for – many organizations that aligned with his beliefs.

=== Animal rights and veganism ===
Zephaniah became a vegetarian at the age of 11, and then became a vegan at the age of 13, when he read poems about "shimmering fish floating in an underwater paradise, and birds flying free in the clear blue sky".

He was an honorary patron of The Vegan Society, Viva!, and EVOLVE! Campaigns, and was an animal rights advocate. In 2004, he wrote the foreword to Keith Mann's book From Dusk 'til Dawn: An insider's view of the growth of the Animal Liberation Movement, a book about the Animal Liberation Front. In August 2007, he announced that he would be launching the Animal Liberation Project, alongside People for the Ethical Treatment of Animals. In February 2001, his book The Little Book of Vegan Poems was published by AK Press.

=== Anti-racism activism ===
Zephaniah spoke extensively about his personal experiences of anti-Black racism in Britain and incorporated his experiences in much of his written work.

In 2012, Zephaniah worked with anti-racism organisation Newham Monitoring Project, with whom he made a video, and Tower Hamlets Summer University (Futureversity) about the impact of Olympic policing on black communities. In that same year, he also wrote about cases of racially abusive language employed by police officers and "the reality of police racism that many of us experience all the time".

In November 2003, Zephaniah was offered appointment in the 2004 New Year Honours as an Officer of the Order of the British Empire (OBE), for which he said he had been recommended by Tony Blair. But he publicly rejected the honour and in a subsequent article for The Guardian, elaborated on learning about being considered for the award and his reasons for rejecting it: "Me? I thought, OBE me? Up yours, I thought. I get angry when I hear that word 'empire'; it reminds me of slavery, it reminds of thousands of years of brutality, it reminds me of how my foremothers were raped and my forefathers brutalised... Benjamin Zephaniah OBE – no way Mr Blair, no way Mrs Queen. I am profoundly anti-empire."

=== Other activism ===
Zephaniah spoke in favour of a British republic and the dis-establishment of the Crown. In 2015, he called for Welsh and Cornish to be taught in English schools, saying: "Hindi, Chinese and French are taught [in schools], so why not Welsh? And why not Cornish? They're part of our culture."

Zephaniah supported Amnesty International in 2005, speaking out against homophobia in Jamaica, saying: "For many years Jamaica was associated with freedom fighters and liberators, so it hurts when I see that the home of my parents is now associated with the persecution of people because of their sexual orientation."

In 2016, Zephaniah curated We Are All Human, an exhibition at London's Southbank Centre presented by the Koestler Trust, which exhibited art works by prisoners, detainees and ex-offenders.

Zephaniah was a supporter of the Palestine Solidarity Campaign and joined demonstrations calling for an end to the Israeli occupation of Palestinian lands, describing the activism as the "Anti Apartheid movement". He was also a supporter of the BDS (Boycott, Divestment and Sanctions) movement.

=== Political views ===
Zephaniah self-identified as an anarchist; observing in a 2022 interview: "...there are places that live without government and live peacefully and happily. A lack of power means people of course aren't fighting over it and the main objective of society is to look after each other." He appeared in literature to support changing the British electoral system from first-past-the-post to alternative vote for electing members of parliament to the House of Commons in the Alternative Vote referendum in 2011. In a 2017 interview, commenting on the ongoing Brexit negotiations, Zephaniah stated: "For left-wing reasons, I think we should leave the EU but the way that we're leaving is completely wrong."

In December 2019, along with 42 other leading cultural figures, he signed a letter endorsing the Labour Party under Jeremy Corbyn's leadership in the 2019 general election. The letter stated: "Labour's election manifesto under Jeremy Corbyn's leadership offers a transformative plan that prioritises the needs of people and the planet over private profit and the vested interests of a few."

== Recognition and awards ==
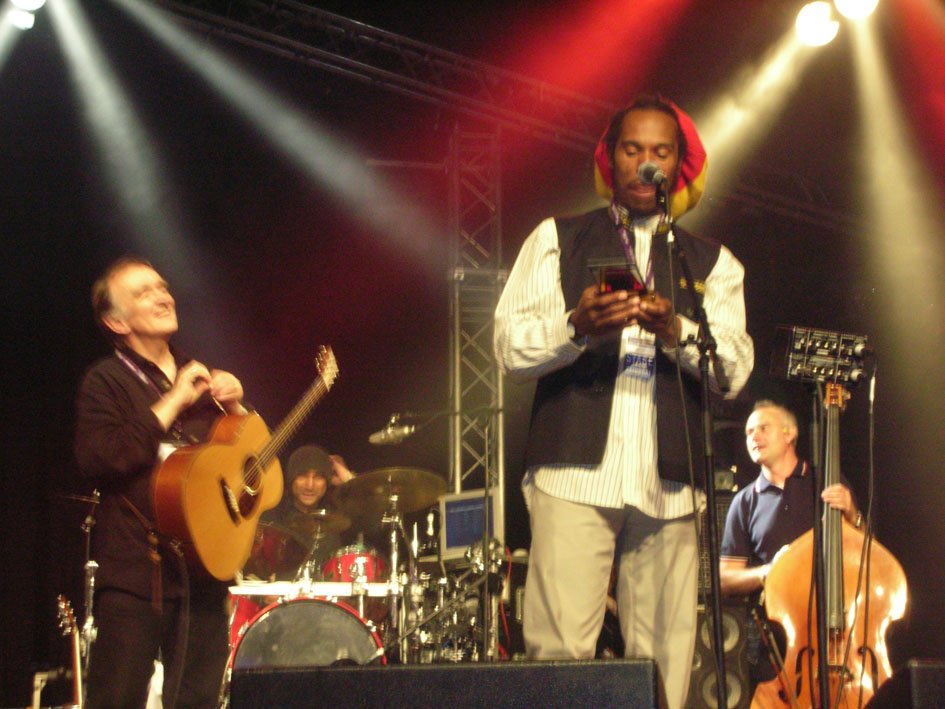
Collecting the Hancock at Cambridge Folk Festival 2008, with Martin Carthy looking on

In 1998, Zephaniah was a winner of the BBC Young Playwrights Festival Award with his first ever radio play Hurricane Dub.

In 1999, he was the subject of an illustrated biographical children's book by Verna Wilkins, entitled Benjamin Zephaniah: A Profile, published in the Black Stars Series of Tamarind Books.

Zephaniah was awarded at least 16 honorary doctorates, by institutions including the University of North London (in 1998), the University of Central England (1999), Staffordshire University (2001), London South Bank University (2003), the University of Exeter, the Open University (2004), Birmingham City University (2005), the University of Westminster (2006), the University of Birmingham (2008), and the University of Hull (DLitt, 2010).

In 2008, he was listed at 48 in The Times list of 50 greatest post-war writers. A ward at Ealing Hospital was named in his honour.

He was awarded Best Original Song in the Hancocks 2008, Talkawhile Awards for Folk Music (as voted by members of Talkawhile.co.uk) for "Tam Lyn Retold", recorded with The Imagined Village project on their eponymous 2007 album. He collected the award at The Cambridge Folk Festival on 2 August 2008, describing himself as a "Rasta Folkie".

To mark National Poetry Day in 2009, the BBC ran an online poll to find the nation's favourite poet, with Zephaniah taking third place in the public vote, behind T. S. Eliot and John Donne, and being the only living poet to be named in the top 10.

Zephaniah was painted by figurative artist Carl Randall in his 2015 series London Portraits, as one of 15 people who had contributed to London society and culture. The series was exhibited at the National Portrait Gallery.

Zephaniah's 2020 reality television series Life & Rhymes, on Sky Arts, celebrating spoken-word performances, won a British Academy Television Award (BAFTA), the Lew Grade Award for Best Entertainment Programme, in 2021.

In April 2025, Brunel University held a Benjamin Zephaniah Day in a campus space newly named in his honour. His wife Qian Zephaniah, Michael Rosen, Jeremy Corbyn and Linton Kwesi Johnson attended.

In May 2025, Birmingham City University renamed the former University House in honour of Zephaniah.

== Personal life ==
Zephaniah's family was Christian, but he became a Rastafarian at a young age. He gave up smoking cannabis in his thirties.

He lived for many years in east London; however, in 2008, he began dividing his time between Moulton Chapel near Spalding, Lincolnshire, and Beijing in China. He was a keen language learner and studied Mandarin Chinese for more than a decade.

Zephaniah was married for 12 years to Amina, a theatre administrator. His infertility – which he discussed openly – meant that they could not have children and his criminal record prevented them from adopting. They divorced in 2001. In 2017, Zephaniah married Qian Zheng, whom he had met on a visit to China three years earlier, and who survives him.

In May 2018, in an interview of BBC Radio 5 Live, Zephaniah admitted that he had been violent to a former partner, confessing to having hit her. He said that he really regretted it later, saying "It burned my conscience so badly. It really ate at me, you know".

His cousin, Michael Powell, died in police custody, at Thornhill Road police station in Birmingham, in September 2003 and Zephaniah regularly raised the matter, continuously campaigning with his brother Tippa Naphtali, who set up a national memorial fund in Powell's name to help families affected by deaths in similar circumstances.

He was a supporter of Aston Villa F.C. – having been taken to matches as a boy, by an uncle – and was the patron for an Aston Villa supporters' website, as well as an ambassador for the club's charity, the Aston Villa Foundation.

== Death and legacy ==
Blue plaque to Benjamin Zephaniah in Birmingham Museum and Art Gallery

Zephaniah died on 7 December 2023, at the age of 65, after being diagnosed with a brain tumour eight weeks previously. His friend of nearly twenty years, Joan Armatrading, gave a tribute to him on Newsnight on BBC Two after hearing the news of his death. Writing on Twitter, she said: "I am in shock. Benjamin Zephaniah has died age 65. What a thoughtful, kind and caring man he was. The world has lost a poet, an intellectual and a cultural revolutionary. I have lost a great friend."

The BBC later re-broadcast Zephaniah's documentary A Picture of Birmingham, in which he revisited his birthplace and his former approved school. Fiona Bruce, the presenter of BBC's Question Time, on which Zephaniah was a regular panellist, paid tribute to him, saying: "He was an all round, just tremendous bloke" for whom she had "huge affection and respect".

According to Martin Glynn of Birmingham City University, Zephaniah was "never an establishment person", but "got into spaces" where he felt he could be heard. Glynn said: "He was the James Brown of dub poetry, the godfather... Linton Kwesi Johnson spoke to the political classes, but Benjamin was a humanist, he made poetry popular and loved music. He had his own studio.... He did what John Cooper Clarke did with poetry and that was bringing it into the mainstream."

Aston Villa Football Club paid tribute to Zephaniah on Saturday, 9 December 2023, in advance of their home match against Arsenal F.C., by playing on the big screens his ode to Villa, originally recorded in 2015.

His private funeral, attended by close friends and family, took place on 28 December, and it was requested that well-wishers plant flowers, trees or plants in Zephaniah’s honour, rather than sending cut flowers.

An artwork featuring Zephaniah that appeared on the wall of an underpass in Hockley, Birmingham, in March 2024 was painted over by a council sub-contractor employed to remove graffiti, although Zephaniah's family had been given assurances that the mural would be protected. Following a public backlash, an apology was issued, and new artwork was subsequently commissioned from black artists, to be unveiled on 14 April at Handsworth Park.

As a tribute, in April 2024, BBC Radio 4 broadcast the 2018 Book of the Week recording of Zephaniah reading his autobiography, The Life and Rhymes of Benjamin Zephaniah.

In September 2024, an outdoor space at Brunel University of London was named after Zephaniah. in April 2025, Brunel University hosted a "Benjamin Zephaniah Day" near the date of 15 April (Zephaniah's birthday).

In October 2024 a commemorative blue plaque to Zephaniah was unveiled in Birmingham Museum and Art Gallery.

On 15 May 2026, Aston Villa once again paid tribute to Zephaniah, unveiling a tifo bearing his likeness across the Holte End before a Premier League match against Liverpool.

== Books ==
=== Poetry ===
- Pen Rhythm (1980), Page One, ISBN 978-0907373001
- The Dread Affair: Collected Poems (1985), Arena, ISBN 978-0099392507
- Rasta time in Palestine (1990), Shakti Publishing Ltd., ISBN 978-0951655108
- City Psalms (1992), Bloodaxe Books, ISBN 978-1852242305
- Inna Liverpool (1992), AK Press, ISBN 978-1873176757
- Talking Turkeys (1994), Puffin Books, ISBN 978-0140363302
- Propa Propaganda (1996), Bloodaxe Books, ISBN 978-1852243722
- Funky Chickens (1997), Puffin, ISBN 978-0140379457
- School's Out: Poems Not for School (1997), AK Press, ISBN 978-1873176498
- Funky Turkeys (audiobook) (1999), Puffin, ASIN B07VJJ8WCX
- Wicked World! (2000), Puffin Random House, ISBN 978-0141306834
- Too Black, Too Strong (2001), Bloodaxe Books, ISBN 978-1852245542
- The Little Book of Vegan Poems (2001), AK Press, ISBN 978-1902593333
- Reggae Head (2006), spoken word audio CD, 57 Productions, ISBN 978-1899021055
- To Do Wid Me (2013), Bloodaxe Books, feature film by Pamela Robertson-Pearce released on DVD with accompanying book, ISBN 978-1852249434
- Dis Poetry (2025), Bloodaxe Books, ISBN 978-1780377414
- Let Dem Know (2026), Puffin Books, ISBN 978-0-241-78970-4

=== Novels ===
- Face (1999), Bloomsbury (published in children's and adult editions)
- Refugee Boy (2001), Bloomsbury
- Gangsta Rap (2004), Bloomsbury
- Teacher's Dead (2007), Bloomsbury
- Terror Kid (2014), Bloomsbury
- Windrush Child (2020), Scholastic, ISBN 978-0702302725

=== Biographies ===
- We Sang Across the Sea: The Empire Windrush and Me (2022), Scholastic. ISBN 978-0702311161 – a biography of Mona Baptiste written by Zephaniah and illustrated by Onyinye Iwu.

=== Children's books ===
- We Are Britain (2002), Frances Lincoln Publishers
- Primary Rhyming Dictionary (2004), Chambers Harrap
- J Is for Jamaica (2006), Frances Lincoln
- My Story (2011), Collins
- When I Grow Up (2011), Frances Lincoln
- Nature Trail (2021), Hachette children
- We Sang Across the Sea (2022), Hachette children
- People Need People (2022), Hachette children
- Leave Trees Please (2025), Scholastic
- A Poem in the Sky (2026), Hachette children
- rewind (2026), Magic Cat
- Windrush Child ( A graphic novel) (2026), Scholastic
- What Stephen Lawrence has taught us (2026), Hachette children

=== Other ===
- Kung Fu Trip (2011), Bloomsbury
- The Life And Rhymes of Benjamin Zephaniah (2018), Simon & Schuster

=== Plays ===
- Playing the Right Tune (1985)
- Job Rocking (1987). Published in Black Plays: 2, ed. Yvonne Brewster, Methuen Drama, 1989.
- Delirium (1987)
- Streetwise (1990)
- Mickey Tekka (1991)
- Listen to Your Parents (included in Theatre Centre: Plays for Young People – Celebrating 50 Years of Theatre Centre, 2003, Aurora Metro; also published by Longman, 2007)
- Face: The Play (with Richard Conlon)

== Acting roles ==
- Didn't You Kill My Brother? (1987) – Rufus
- Farendj (1989) – Moses
- Dread Poets' Society (1992) – himself
- Truth or Dairy (1994) – The Vegan Society (UK)
- Crucial Tales (1996) – Richard's father
- Making the Connection (2010) – Environment Films / The Vegan Society (UK)
- Peaky Blinders (2013–2022) – Jeremiah Jesus

== Discography ==
=== Albums ===
- Rasta (1982), Upright (reissued 1989), Workers Playtime (UK Indie #22)
- Us An Dem (1990), Island
- Back to Roots (1995), Acid Jazz
- Belly of De Beast (1996), Ariwa
- Naked (2005), One Little Indian
- Naked & Mixed-Up (2006), One Little Indian (Benjamin Zephaniah Vs. Rodney-P)
- Revolutionary Minds (2017), Fane Productions

=== Singles and EPs ===
- Dub Ranting EP (1982), Radical Wallpaper
- Big Boys Don't Make Girls Cry 12-inch single (1984), Upright
- Free South Africa (1986)
- Crisis 12-inch single (1992), Workers Playtime

=== Guest appearances ===
- Empire (1995), Bomb the Bass with Zephaniah & Sinéad O'Connor
- Heading for the Door by Back to Base (2000), MPR Records
- Illegal (2000), from "Himawari" by Swayzak
- Theatricks (2000), by Kinobe
- Open Wide (2004), Dubioza kolektiv (C) & (P) Gramofon
- Rebel by Toddla T (2009), 1965 Records
- New Dawn (2009) by Pat D & Lady Paradox
- Take A Ride and I Have A Dream (2013) by L.B. Dub Corp

== See also ==
- List of animal rights advocates
