= Verna Wilkins =

Grenada-born publisher and author (born 1940s)

Verna Allette Wilkins FRSL
- Born: 1940s Grenada, Windward Islands
- Occupations: Publisher and author of children's books
- Known for: Founder of Tamarind Books
- Notable work: Dave and the Tooth Fairy (1993)
- Children: 2

Verna Allette Wilkins FRSL (born 1943) is a Grenada-born publisher and author, now resident in London. In 1987, she founded the children's books imprint Tamarind Books, "producing quality inclusive literature that featured Black, Asian and minority ethnic children and children with disabilities" out of her concern about the effect on children who did not see themselves represented in books. Tamarind was acquired 20 years later by the Random House Group and became part of Random House Children's Books. Wilkins is also the author of more than 40 picture books and biographies for young people.

== Background ==
Wilkins was born in Grenada, where her father was a head teacher who was instrumental in introducing Caribbean History to a curriculum dominated by Britain's past. Wilkins has said: "He told us stories relevant to our lives. Stories from Africa and the Caribbean – stories that included people like us. He worked hard to give his children and his pupils self-worth. He used the imported European stories to broaden our horizons outside our small tropical island."

=== Publishing ===
Wilkins, a former further education teacher, realised the powerful impact of early learning material after one of her two sons, soon after starting school as a five-year-old, came home with a "This is Me" booklet in which he had coloured himself pink. However, when she offered him a brown crayon to use instead, he refused, saying that the image he had drawn of himself had to have pink skin because it was for a book: "He had already learned, at that early age, that he did not qualify for entry into the world of books." When she researched the matter further, she arrived at the conclusion that her child and other children from the ethnic minorities were so under-represented in children's books that they were being denied an important stage in their learning, so Wilkins was motivated to begin producing books to meet that need.

Starting Tamarind Books in 1987, Wilkins ran the company from her home, writing many of the books herself. New titles were published only when there was enough money in the company bank account, and in the early years she sold the books herself. As she later wrote: "On the kitchen table, with the support of my partner and our sons, we began a business which lasted for a quarter of a century. I was aware of the discourse on race and cultural diversity as early as the 1960s, in response to the UK's growing population of immigrants from the Caribbean, India, Pakistan and Bangladesh, with discussions abounding about 'multicultural education'. So I went to schools and spoke with teachers; there was a captive audience of hundreds of thousands of children, attending schools that were advised to produce an inclusive curriculum. At that time, I was also working as a lecturer."

As Tamarind Books found success, Wilkins decided that the imprint needed "growth, expansion and a committed team to take it to the next stage of development as an international publishing concern", and in 2007 it was acquired by Random House Group Ltd and became an imprint of Random House Children's Books (UK), with Wilkins retained until she handed over to a new team in 2009.

In 2008, Tamarind Books was awarded the Decibel Cultural Diversity Award in the British Book Awards (Nibbies).

Building on her achievement with Tamarind, in 2016 Wilkins set up Firetree Books, which she ran as a pilot venture until 2017. As part of the Firetree project, which had Arts Council support, Wilkins produced the books A Visit to City Farm and Abdi's Day in collaboration with primary school children, who featured as co-publishers and whose names were included within the books. Wilkins has also worked in schools in Uganda, involving children there in the editorial process of books in which they could see themselves portrayed.

=== Writing ===
Wilkins is the author of more than 40 picture books and biographies for young people, and her books have featured on the National Curriculum and on BBC children's television, and been among titles chosen as Children's Books of the Year.

Wilkins wrote two of the best-known titles published by the Tamarind Books imprint: The Life of Stephen Lawrence (2001), and Dave and The Tooth Fairy (1993), which featured a black tooth fairy and sold more than 200,000 in its first edition. Tamarind also published biographies written by Wilkins for a series called Black Profiles, celebrating the lives of role models such as Malorie Blackman, Benjamin Zephaniah, Rudolph Walker, Baroness Scotland, Chinwe Roy, David Grant and Samantha Tross.

Wilkins contributed an essay to the 2019 anthology New Daughters of Africa (edited by Margaret Busby) in which she explains that she began her work creating books in diverse classrooms in the belief that the process must start with children: "They should see themselves as the authors, editors, designers, illustrators and publishers of the future."

== Other literary work ==
Wilkins chaired the former trade association Independent Black Publishers (IBP), with a view to sharing experiences and maximising mutual strengths so as to increase the impact of UK black publishers, with Margaret Busby as patron. In 2007 at the London Book Fair a joint IBP stand showcased the books of Bogle-L'Ouverture Press, Tamarind Books, the X Press, Ayebia Clarke Publishing, Joan Anim-Addo's Mango Press, Jessica Huntley's Bogle-L'Ouverture Publications and other Black ventures.

Wilkins has served as a judge for literary prizes including the Burt Award for Caribbean Literature and the Jhalak Prize, and is also internationally regarded as an acclaimed speaker, facilitating conferences in the UK, Europe, Africa and the Caribbean.

She was elected as a Fellow of the Royal Society of Literature in 2021.

== Awards ==
- 2007: Highly Commended at the Independent Publishers Guild (IPG) Awards in category "IPG Diversity Award".
- 2008: Winner of Cultural Diversity Award at the British Book Awards (Nibbies).
- 2014: Newman University Birmingham awarded Wilkins the honorary degree of Doctor of Letters for her work as a champion for children's literature and her involvement with the education sector.
- 2021: Elected a Fellow of the Royal Society of Literature (FRSL).

== Selected bibliography ==
- Dave and the Tooth Fairy, illustrated by Paul Hunt, Tamarind Books, 1993, ISBN 978-1870516136. Reissue, illustrated by Carl Pearce, Templar Publishing, 2019, ISBN 978-1787415409.
- Are We There Yet?, illustrated by George McLeod and Lynne Willey, Tamarind Books, 1995, ISBN 978-1870516297.
- Martin Luther King, Tamarind Books, 1998.
- Benjamain Zephaniah, illustrated by Gillian Hunt, Tamarind Books, 1999, ISBN 978-1870516389; paperback, 2008, ISBN 978-1848530027.
- Samantha Tross: Surgeon, Tamarind Books, 2000.
- The Life of Stephen Lawrence, Tamarind Books (2001); 2012, ISBN 978-1848531055.
- Chinwe Roy: Artist, Tamarind Books, 2002, ISBN 978-1870516594.
- Malorie Blackman: Author, illustrated by Virginia Gray, Tamarind Books, 2003, ISBN 978-1870516495.
- Hurricane, illustrated by Tim Clarey, Tamarind Books, 2004.
- The History of the Steel Band (with Michael La Rose), illustrated by Lynne Willey, Tamarind Books, 2006 ISBN 978-1870516747.
- Rudolph Walker, Tamarind Books, 2008.
- A Visit to City Farm, illustrated by Karin Littlewood, Firetree Books, ISBN 9781911402077.
- Abdi's Day, illustrated by Karin Littlewood, Firetree Books, ISBN 9781911402060.
