= Angry White People =

2016 book by Hsiao-Hung Pai

Angry White People: Coming Face-to-face with the British Far-Right is a 2016 book written by Taiwanese-born journalist and writer Hsiao-Hung Pai and published by Zed Books. The book examines racism and far-right views among the white working class in Britain, with a special emphasis on the English Defence League (EDL). Its foreword was written by British poet Benjamin Zephaniah.

== Content ==
In the book, Pai interviews EDL leader Tommy Robinson in his hometown of Luton. She finds his views on race to be similar to those expressed by mainstream right-wing figures in Britain, rather than the overt racism of the British National Party. Pai expresses the view that white working class Britons face economic issues and contempt from Britain's political elite. The book chronicles the history of the EDL, interviewing its members and members of opposing groups such as Unite Against Fascism.

== Reception ==
Hassan Mahamdallie of The Independent praised how Pai was able to empathise with the hardships of some white working class members of the EDL without sympathising with their political aims. He called the book an "enlightening, thoughtful and intelligent study". In the Morning Star, Paul Simon praised an "almost ethnographic level of detail" in documenting how working class Britons drifted towards the EDL. Conversely, John Lloyd of the Financial Times found the book unbalanced, as it quoted figures from the organisation Cage while strongly criticising the Quilliam think tank.

Musa Okwonga of the New Statesman found the book timely for its release during the 2015 European migrant crisis and reaction by anti-migration groups such as Pegida in Germany. Lloyd instead pointed to the recent 2016 Brussels bombings and found it unfortunate that Pai had relied on sources by Arun Kundnani, who proposes that Western fear of Islamic terrorism is exaggerated. Rod Liddle wrote a scathing review in The Spectator Australia, calling the book "hideously mistaken on almost every page".
