= Refugee Boy =

2001 teen novel by Benjamin Zephaniah

- First edition
- Author: Benjamin Zephaniah
- Publisher: Bloomsbury Publishing (London)
- Publication date: 28 August 2001
- Publication place: United Kingdom
- Pages: 224 pp (Paperback edition)

Refugee Boy is a teen novel written by Benjamin Zephaniah. It is a book about Alem Kelo, a 14-year-old refugee from Ethiopia and Eritrea. It was first published by Bloomsbury on 28 August 2001. The novel was the recipient of the 2002 Portsmouth Book Award in the Longer Novel category.

== Plot ==
Alem is a refugee from Ethiopia. His parents are both Eritrean and Ethiopian. Alem escapes to England from a violent civil war in Badme, which at the time of the novel (2000/1999) was disputed to be either in Ethiopia or in Eritrea. In 1991, 14-year-old Alem and his father are in the capital of Eritrea, his mother's home country. When Alem is ten years old, he and his family move to Harar in Ethiopia, his father's country. In Ethiopia, his father gets a better job within the postal service, but Alem's mother loses her job because the Ethiopian workers say they are "at war with Eritrea, so they will not work with someone from Eritrea". Alem's father is then told by his co-workers that he must leave his wife because she is Eritrean and therefore "the enemy". Alem’s mother is held at point blank before pushed onto a bus.

One night the police break into Alem's home and force the family, along with other mixed families, onto buses going back to Eritrea. After returning to Eritrea the family begins to experience the same discrimination, and Alem is attacked and beaten at school. Alem’s father is held at point blank before pushed onto a bus.

Alem's father takes him to London, England, under the pretext of a holiday to celebrate his fourteenth birthday. They stay in a hotel near Heathrow, in Datchet, and his father takes Alem sightseeing in London. They finish the day with an Amharic goodnight. Then, Alem wakes up and looks over to the empty bed beside him and thinks his father is at breakfast, but finds that he has left him alone with a letter. The letter says that he and Alem's mother will continue to fight for peace with the organisation EAST and that they hope one day Alem can rejoin them. Mr. Hardwick allows Alem to stay for a few days and on the final day he brings in the Refugee Council, who send Alem to a children's home. His time at the home is violent and disturbing as a rude boy, Sweeney, decides to beat him up. Alem tries to run away but ends up back at the home. He is then moved to London and placed in a foster family (the Fitzgerald's). Mr. and Mrs. Fitzgerald are a professional foster family. Ruth, their teenage daughter, seems unhappy with Alem. Alem returns from his first day at school, where he has made two friends, Robert and Buck, to discover a letter from his father indicating his mother has gone missing.

Alem receives a letter from the Home Office rejecting his application for asylum. An appeal date is set for 7 January 2000, where Alem meets Nicholas, his barrister, and charms the judge by wishing everyone a happy Christmas. At the appeal a hearing date is set for 16 February. Soon after Christmas, Alem receives another letter from his father explaining that his mother has been killed and that his father will try to get Alem back. Ruth, the foster family's daughter, provides solace for Alem.

His father soon turns up at his house and they go for dinner (spaghetti). The following Monday, Alem comes home to find that his father had gone to the Home Office to submit his asylum application, but was arrested and taken to Campsfield House immigration detention centre. Nicholas will also represent Alem's father and apply for their dank bail. Bail is awarded, and Alem's father is put into a grimy hostel in Forest Gate, and it is revealed that both Alem's and his father's application for asylum will be heard together.

On 15 February Alem, his father, Nicholas and Mrs. Fitzgerald go to court. The judge rejects the application for asylum on the basis that there are millions of Ethiopians and Eritreans unaffected by the war and that Alem is no longer without a family member to take care of him. They decide they will appeal.

Robert, Buck and Asher decide to start a campaign though Alem's father is not initially pleased with the idea but agrees to go to the first meeting. Alem also finds out that he is no longer able to stay at the Fitzgerald's' since he is no longer a ward of the state but has to move in with his father as he has come back to England.

Alem's father gives his blessing for Robert, Buck and Asher to start the campaign. He moves in with his father and the campaign picks up pace. Several events including a dance and a street march are held. A petition with six thousand signatures is handed to the local MP. The Monday following the march Alem receives a hero's welcome from his school, and a Positive Pupil Certificate from the Headmaster.

Alem awaits his father at home with the certificate but instead his social worker comes to the door along with a police officer to inform him that his father has been shot and killed while leaving the London branch of EAST. Alem is returned to the Fitzgerald's' and receives a letter with his appeal date for 27 March.

Finally, Alem is awarded asylum. The author then notes that the Ethiopian and Eritrean governments signed a peace treaty in Algeria on 20 December 2000.

== Responses ==
In the article entitled "A Postcolonial Approach to Contemporary Refugee Literature: Benjamin Zephaniah's Refugee Boy", Sercan Hamza Bağlama points out that the novel "fictionalises the refugee experience in a 'strange' land and exposes the traumatic effects of war and politics upon innocent people through its 14-year-old Eritrean-Ethiopian protagonist, Alem Kelo, who has fled the war and ended up as a refugee in the UK", and that the novel can therefore be categorised as an example of contemporary refugee literature.

== Adaptation ==
The novel has been adapted into a play of the same name by Lemn Sissay. It was first performed in Leeds at the West Yorkshire Playhouse on 9 March 2013.

== Characters ==
The book contains characters from both Africa and England.

- Alem Kelo: Main character.
- Mr. Kelo: Alem's father.
- Mrs. Kelo: Alem's mother.
- Mr. and Mrs. Fitzgerald: Alem's foster/adopted parents in England.
- Ruth: Fitzgerald's daughter.
- Sheila: Alem's social worker.
- Mariam: A woman from the refugee council who speaks Amharic to help talk to Alem.
- Pamela: A woman from the refugee council who also helps to get him a hearing to stay in England.
- Robert (Roberto Fernandez): Alem’s school friend, who smokes.
- Sweeney: A bully from the care home, who started a fight over biscuits.
- Stanley: A kid at the care home. He shared a room with Alem; Stanley always talked in his sleep about his mum and his family was separated.
- Mr. Hardwick: The hotel manager who looked after Alem when he first arrived.
- Nicholas Morgan: A barrister for Alem; he is trying to get him refugee status.
- Buck: loves playing the guitar and is one of the students from Alem’s school.
- Asher: a teenager who likes Alem as a friend and thinks that Alem is really nice
