= Tamarind Books =

British publisher of children's books

- Tamarind Books logo
- Parent company: Random House
- Founded: 1987; 39 years ago
- Founder: Verna Wilkins
- Country of origin: United Kingdom
- Headquarters location: London
- Publication types: Children's books
- Official website: www.tamarindbooks.co.uk

Tamarind Books is a small independent British publisher specialising in picture books, fiction and non-fiction featuring black and Asian children and children with disabilities. It was founded by Verna Wilkins in 1987 with the mission of redressing the balance of diversity in children's publishing, and in 2007 became an imprint of Random House Children's Books UK.

== History ==
Verna Wilkins

Tamarind Books was founded by Grenada-born Verna Wilkins in 1987 after her five-year-old son came home from school with a "This is Me" booklet in which he had coloured himself pink. When she offered him a brown crayon to use instead, he refused, saying that the image he had drawn of himself had to have pink skin because it was for a book. When she researched the matter further, she arrived at the conclusion that her child and other children from the ethnic minorities were so under-represented in children's books that they were being denied an important stage in their learning, so she decided to start publishing books to meet that need.

For twenty years, Wilkins ran Tamarind Books from her home, writing many of the books herself, working with the support of her family and a small group of friends and freelancers. New books were published only when there was enough money in the company bank account. In the early years, she sold the books herself. Later, Tamarind books were distributed by commercial distributors.

Two of the imprint's best-known titles, both written by Wilkins, are The Life of Stephen Lawrence (2001), and Dave and The Tooth Fairy (1993), featuring a computer-literate black tooth fairy. Tamarind also specialises in biographies of black role models, in the Black Stars series, which includes biographies of Malorie Blackman, Benjamin Zephaniah, Rudolph Walker, Baroness Scotland, Chinwe Chukwuogo-Roy, David Grant and Samantha Tross.

=== Acquisition by Random House ===
In 2007, Tamarind Books was acquired by Random House Group Ltd and became an imprint of Random House Children's Books (UK).

In 2008, Tamarind Books was awarded the Decibel Cultural Diversity Award in the British Book Awards (Nibbies).

In October 2009, Wilkins retired from publishing, and a successor, Patsy Isles, was announced. In January 2011, a new team comprising editors from Random House (Ruth Knowles, Parul Bavishi, Joe Marriott and Sue Buswell) were brought in to run Tamarind, with Verna Wilkins acting as a consultant, with the patrons of Tamarind, alongside Wilkins, being Michael Rosen, Benjamin Zephaniah, Jamila Gavin and Meera Syal.

The titles that were historically published under the Tamarind Books imprint are now part of the Puffin and Ladybird lists.

== Awards ==
- 2007: Tamarind Books Highly Commended at the Independent Publishers Guild (IPG) Awards in category "IPG Diversity Award"
- 2008: Tamarind Books wins Cultural Diversity Award at the Nibbies
