= Rustication (academia) =

Time away from school as punishment

Rustication is a term used at Oxford, Cambridge and Durham Universities to mean being suspended or expelled temporarily, or, in more recent times, to leave temporarily for welfare or health reasons. The term derives from the Latin word rus, countryside, to indicate that a student has been sent back to his or her family in the country, or from medieval Latin rustici, meaning "heathens or barbarians" (missus in rusticōs, "sent among ..."). Depending on the conditions given, a student who has been rusticated may not be allowed to enter any of the university buildings, or even travel to within a certain distance of them. The related term bannimus implies a permanent, publicly announced expulsion, at least in Oxford.

The term is still used in British public schools (i.e., private schools) and schools and universities in former British colonies (like India), and was used in the United States during the 19th century, although it has been superseded by the term "suspension".

== Use in the United Kingdom ==
Notable Britons who were rusticated during their time at University have included:

- John Lyly (c. 1553–1606), author of Euphues. Rusticated from Magdalen College, Oxford, for unknown reasons.
- John Milton (1609–1674), rusticated from Christ's College, Cambridge, in 1626 for quarreling with his tutor.
- John Dryden (1631–1700), rusticated from Trinity College, Cambridge, for having exchanged insults with his college vice-master.
- Walter Savage Landor (1775–1864), rusticated from Trinity College, Oxford, in 1794. Landor had fired a gun at the window of a fellow student whose late night revelry had disturbed him and for whom he had an aversion. Landor chose not to return.
- Percy Bysshe Shelley (1792–1822), rusticated from University College, Oxford, in 1811 for writing "The Necessity of Atheism" and then disseminating the pamphlet to the heads of all colleges at the University. Shelley had originally been sent down (permanently expelled), but upon a supplication from his father to the University was given a chance to deny authorship and return. Shelley refused to deny authorship and was therefore sent down.
- Richard Francis Burton (1821–1890), rusticated from Trinity College, Oxford, in 1842 for challenging a fellow student to a duel, the latter having mocked the shape of Burton's moustache.
- Algernon Charles Swinburne (1837–1909), rusticated from Balliol College, Oxford, in 1859 for having publicly supported the attempted assassination of Napoleon III by Orsini.
- Oscar Wilde (1854–1900), rusticated from Magdalen College, Oxford, after having returned to his college some three weeks after a new term had begun.
- James William Webb-Jones (1904 - 1965), Welsh choral educator and co-founder of the English Jesters Cricket Club, rusticated from Worcester College, Oxford, for Michaelmas term 1925, for lack of academic diligence.
- John Betjeman (1906–1984), rusticated from Magdalen College, Oxford, in 1928.
- Mark Boxer (1931–1988), rusticated in the 1950s from King's College, Cambridge, as editor of Granta, the student magazine, when it published a poem deemed by the authorities to be blasphemous.
- Auberon Waugh (1939–2001), rusticated from Christ Church, Oxford, in 1957. Waugh failed to perform sufficiently well to pass his Philosophy, Politics and Economics prelim exams. Waugh chose not to return.
- Nick Raynsford (b. 1945), rusticated from Sidney Sussex College, Cambridge following a night climbing incident in which he had displayed a banner against the Vietnam War between the pinnacles of King's College Chapel.

== Use in the United States ==
The term was widely used in the United States in the 19th century, and on occasion, later. Mark Twain and Charles Dudley Warner, in The Gilded Age, have a character explain the term:

"Philip used to come to Fallkill often while he was in college. He was once rusticated here for a term."

"Rusticated?"

"Suspended for some College scrape."

In a story in the August 1858 Atlantic Monthly, a character reminisces:

"It was long before you were born, my dear, that, for some college peccadilloes,—it is so long ago that I have almost forgotten now what they were,—I was suspended (rusticated we called it) for a term, and advised by the grave and dignified president to spend my time in repenting and in keeping up with my class. I had no mind to come home; I had no wish, by my presence, to keep the memory of my misdemeanors before my father's mind for six months; so I asked and gained leave to spend the summer in a little town in Western Massachusetts, where, as I said, I should have nothing to tempt me from my studies."

Kevin Starr writes of Richard Henry Dana Jr. that:

"Harvard's rigid rules and narrow curriculum had proved equally repressive. Rusticated for taking part in a student rebellion, Dana had spent six months in quiet rural study in Andover under a kindly clerical tutor."

A biographer refers to one of James Russell Lowell's college letters as "written while he was at Concord because rusticated".

In a 1932 letter to Time, the publisher William Randolph Hearst denied he had been expelled from Harvard College, saying he had instead been "rusticated in [1886] for an excess of political enthusiasm" and had simply never returned.

The term is still used occasionally in the United States. For example:

"The penalty for plagiarism at Harvard Extension is a failing grade in the course and rustication from the university for at least one calendar year."

At Rice University, rustication is a punishment separate from suspension. Students who have been rusticated are banned from social activities on campus and are only allowed on campus to attend class.

== See also ==
- Expulsion (education)
- Suspension (punishment)

== Bibliography ==
- Guardian story about being rusticated
- Kevin Starr, 1973: Americans and the California Dream 1850-1915, Oxford University Press. 1986 reprint: ISBN 0-19-504233-6
