= British Soap Award for Outstanding Achievement =

Annual British TV award

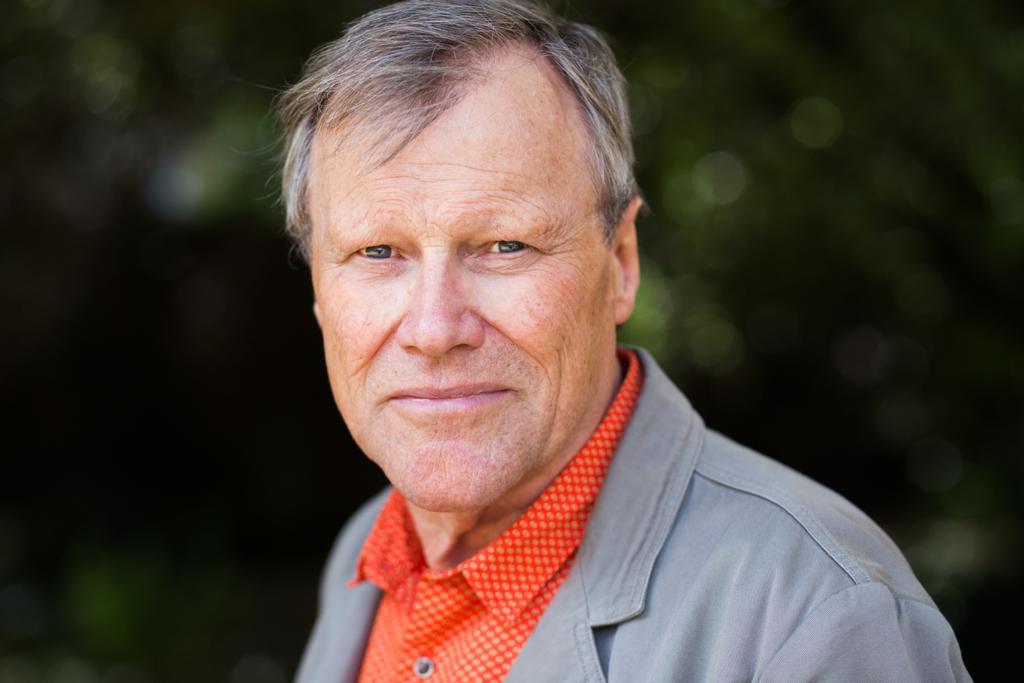
- The 2025 recipient: David Neilson
- Country: United Kingdom
- First award: 1999
- Final award: 2025

Highlights
- Most awards: Coronation Street (10)

The British Soap Award for Outstanding Achievement was an award presented annually by the British Soap Awards, formerly known as the Lifetime Achievement award until 2013. The winner was decided by a panel and celebrates the soap career and achievements of each recipient. Coronation Street is the most awarded soaps in the category, holding nine wins. The final winner of the award was Coronation Street actor David Neilson, who portrays Roy Cropper in the soap.

== Recipients ==
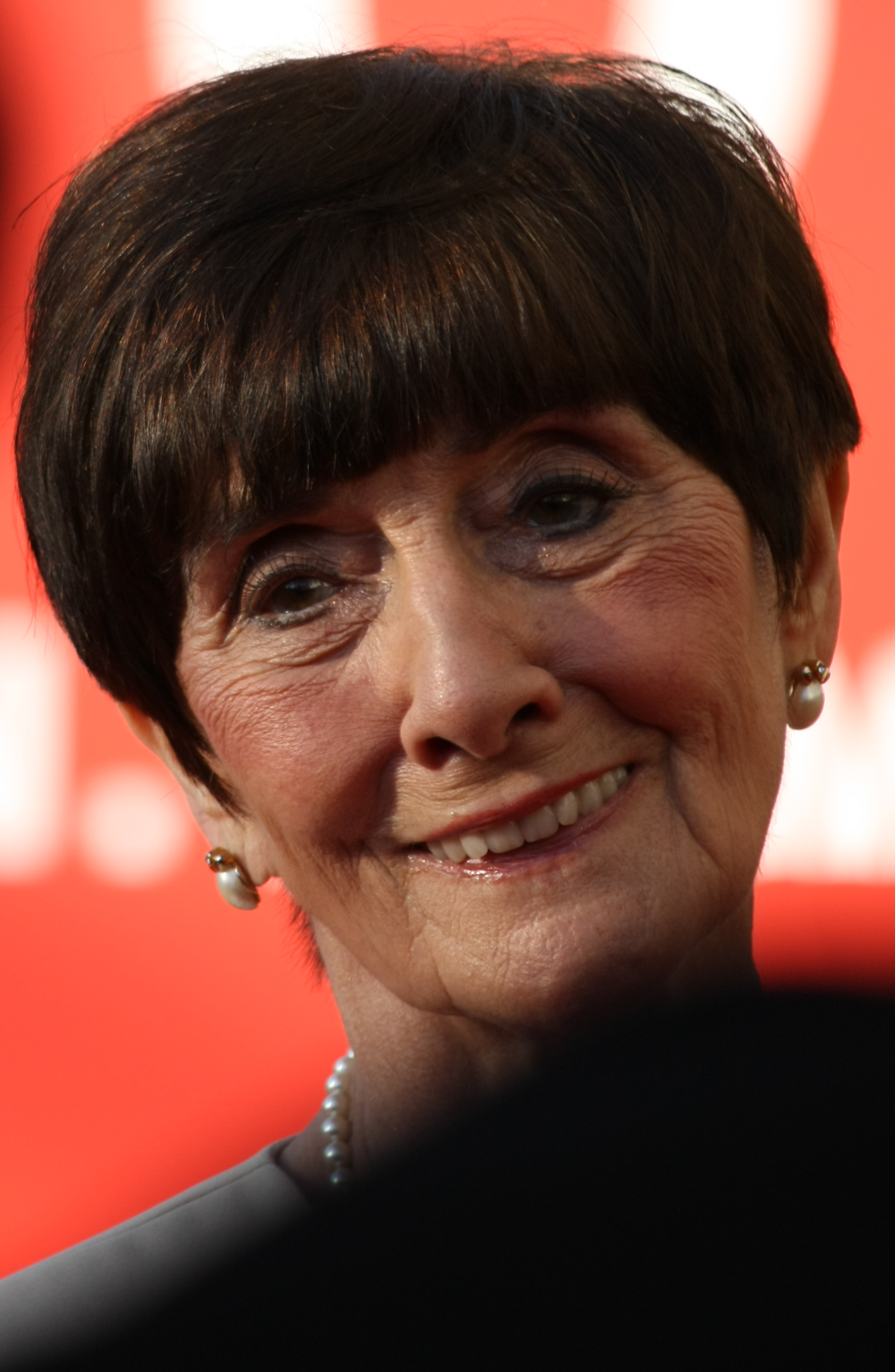
2005 winner June Brown.

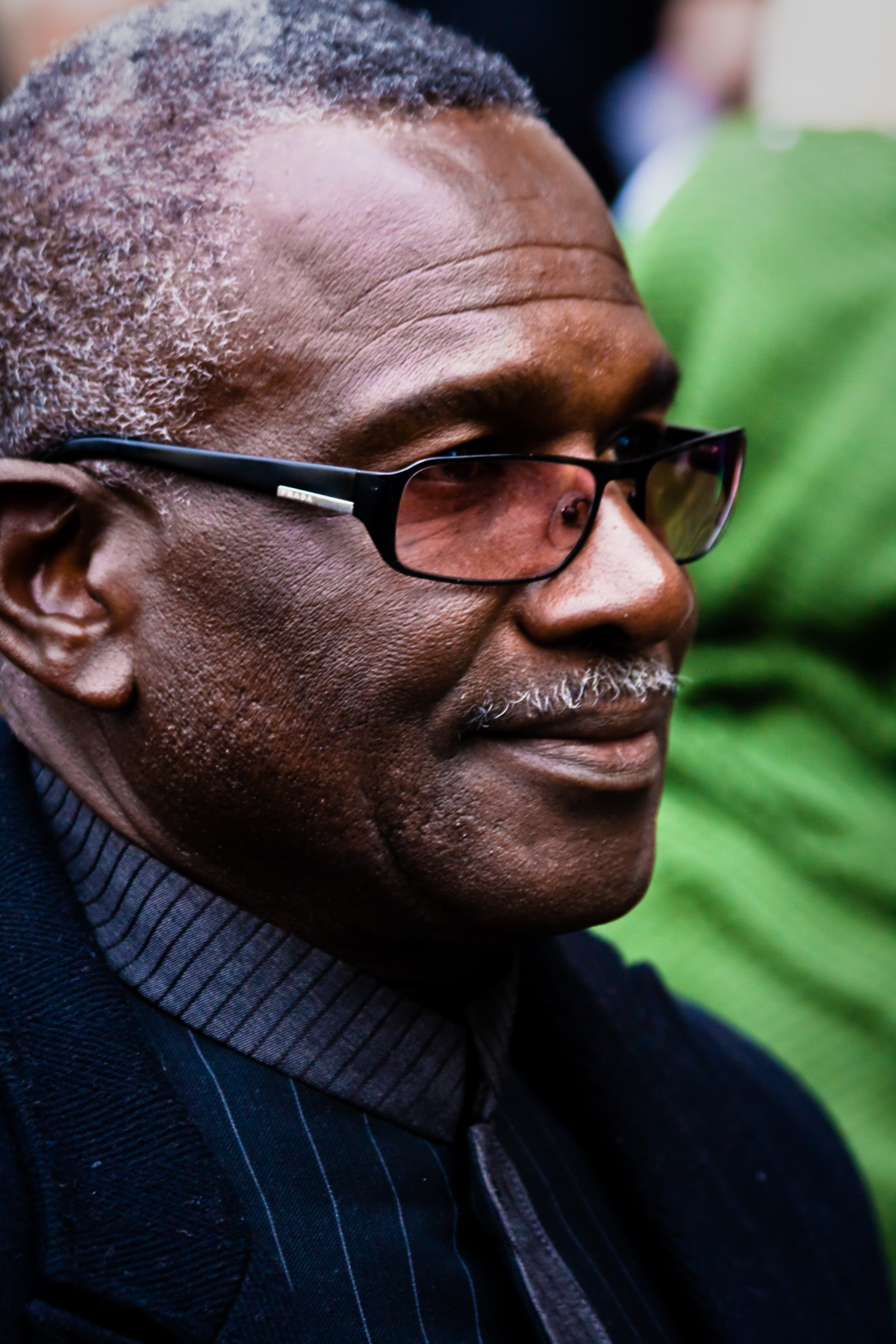
2018 winner Rudolph Walker.

Year	Actor	Role	Soap opera
1999	William Roache	Ken Barlow	Coronation Street
2003	Dean Sullivan	Jimmy Corkhill	Brookside
2004	Barbara Knox	Rita Sullivan	Coronation Street
2005	June Brown	Dot Branning	EastEnders
2006	Johnny Briggs	Mike Baldwin	Coronation Street
2007	Wendy Richard	Pauline Fowler	EastEnders
2008	Liz Dawn	Vera Duckworth	Coronation Street
2009	Barbara Windsor	Peggy Mitchell	EastEnders
2010	Betty Driver	Betty Williams	Coronation Street
2011	Bill Tarmey	Jack Duckworth	Coronation Street
2012	Pam St Clement	Pat Evans	EastEnders
2013	Adam Woodyatt	Ian Beale	EastEnders
2014	Helen Worth	Gail McIntyre	Coronation Street
2015	Anne Kirkbride	Deirdre Barlow	Coronation Street
2016	Steve McFadden	Phil Mitchell	EastEnders
2017	Nick Pickard	Tony Hutchinson	Hollyoaks
2018	Rudolph Walker	Patrick Trueman	EastEnders
2019	Sue Nicholls	Audrey Roberts	Coronation Street
2022	Letitia Dean	Sharon Watts	EastEnders
2023	Mark Charnock	Marlon Dingle	Emmerdale
2025	David Neilson	Roy Cropper	Coronation Street

== Wins by soap ==
Soap opera	Wins
Coronation Street	9
EastEnders	8
Brookside	1
Emmerdale	1
Hollyoaks	1
