= Samantha Tross =

British orthopaedic surgeon

- Born: 30 June 1968 (age 57); Georgetown, Guyana
- Education: Matthew Boulton College; University College, London
- Occupation: Surgeon
- Known for: Being the first black female orthopaedic surgeon in Britain

Samantha Tross (born 30 June 1968) is a British orthopaedic surgeon. In 2005, Tross became the first black female orthopaedic surgeon in Britain and has been regularly recognized as one of Britains most influential Black Britons in the annual Powerlist.

== Personal life ==
Samantha Tross was born in Georgetown in Guyana in 1968 to Sammy and Gwendolin Tross. She was the second of four children and she is said to have borrowed her brother's toys. She attended primary school in Guyana. Her family moved to Britain when she was 11 years old, because her father who worked for the Commonwealth Secretariat was given a post in Britain. The secretariat is based at Marlborough House in London. Tross completed her education at private schools in Britain and then at Matthew Boulton College in Birmingham. She excelled at sport, becoming the British national long jump champion for her age, and she passed A-Levels in applied mathematics, chemistry and biology. She took medicine at University College London, where she decided to become a surgeon.

== Professional life ==
Tross is unsure of what caused her initial interest in medicine in medicine but thinks that the death of her grandparents when she was the young age of seven was a contribution to her interest. She also notes that while in medical school she was exposed to many different specialities in medicine, but the surgeons in orthopedics made her feel wanted and useful.

This was an unusual course for a British woman: only 11% of consultant surgeons in Britain are female. She trained at various hospitals and completed her training in orthopaedic surgery in 2004. She is a fellow of the Royal College of Surgeons. She specialises in re-constructive hip and knee surgery. Although she is known for her work with hip and knee surgery, she also does work on the shoulder, elbow, hand and foot and ankle.

== Notable achievements ==
Tross's brief biography is included (in 2015) in the International Slavery Museum run by Liverpool Museums. She is said to be one of the 100 most influential Black Britons; and has regularly been included in the annual Powerlist, of the 100 most influential Black British people, with her most recent appearance on the Powerlist 2021. Tross was the subject of a biography by Verna Wilkins published by Tamarind Books in 2008.
