= Rudolph Walker =

Trinidadian actor (born 1939)

Rudolph Walker CBE
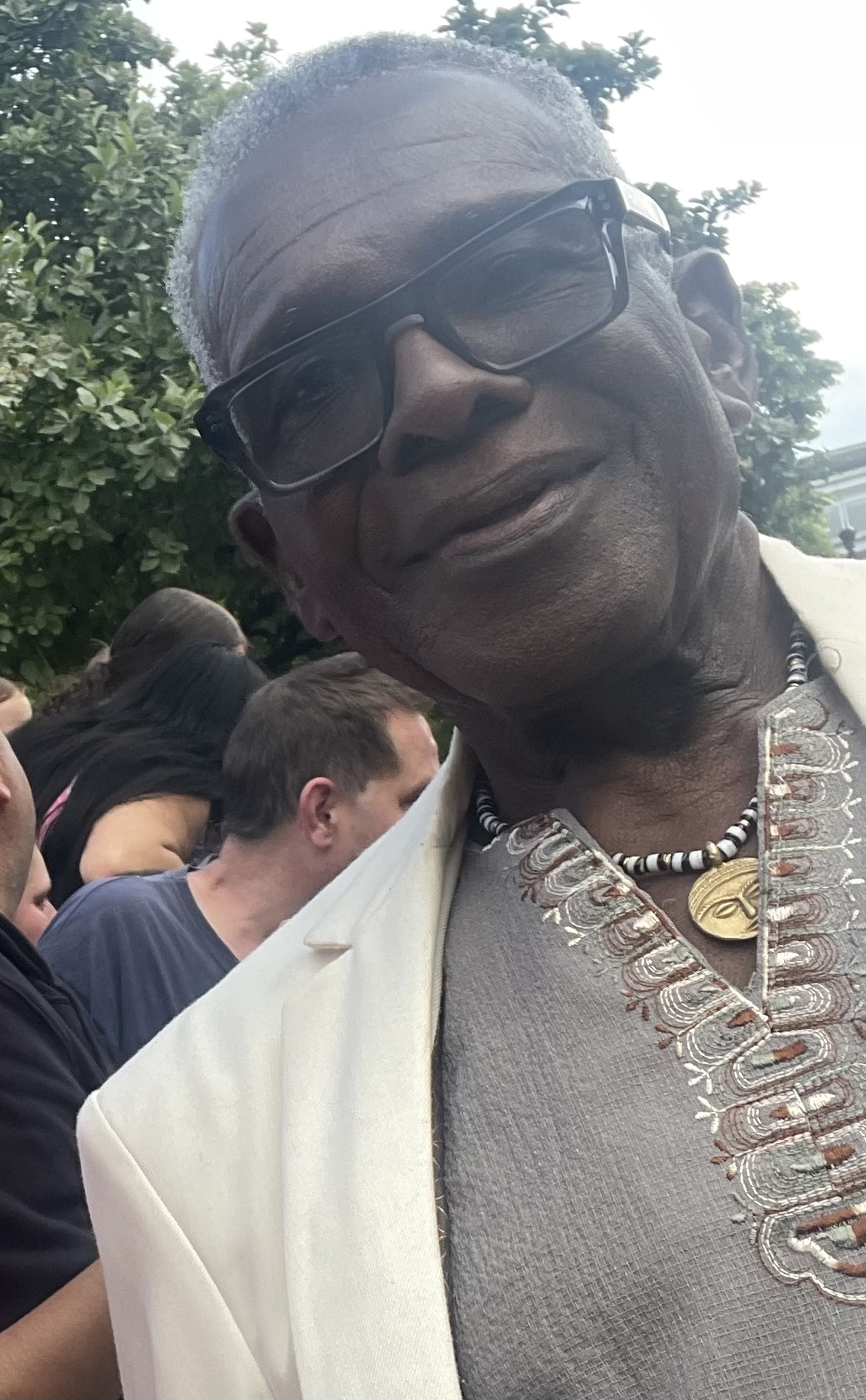
- Walker in 2025
- Born: Rudolph Malcolm Walker; 28 September 1939 (age 87); San Juan, Trinidad and Tobago
- Occupation: Actor
- Years active: 1964–present
- Known for: Love Thy Neighbour (1972–1976); The Thin Blue Line (1995–1996); EastEnders (2001–present)
- Spouse: Lorna Ross (m. 1968, divorced)
- Children: 2
- Website: rudolphwalkerfoundation.com

Rudolph Malcolm Walker (born 28 September 1939) is a Trinidadian actor, best known for his roles as Bill Reynolds in Love Thy Neighbour (1972–1976) and Constable Frank Gladstone in The Thin Blue Line (1995–1996), as well as his long-running portrayal of Patrick Trueman on the BBC soap opera EastEnders (2001–present), for which he received the 2018 British Soap Award for Outstanding Achievement. He also provided voiceovers for both the British and American versions of Teletubbies (1997–2001). Walker's feature film credits include 10 Rillington Place (1971), Bhaji on the Beach (1993), and Ali G Indahouse (2002). He runs The Rudolph Walker Foundation, a charity designed to help disadvantaged youths find careers in entertainment, and was appointed Commander of the Order of the British Empire (CBE) in 2021.

== Early life ==
Rudolph Malcolm Walker was born on 28 September 1939 in San Juan, Trinidad and Tobago. He began acting as an eight-year-old in primary school, going on to join Derek Walcott's Trinidad Theatre Workshop as its youngest member. With the aim of furthering his career he left the island at the age of 21 in 1960. He had been planning to go to the United States, where he had connections, but actor Errol John — who had already migrated to Britain but was in Trinidad doing a play — convinced him to go to the UK, where the training was considered to be superior.

== Career ==
Walker's earliest television role was as a policeman in the British The Wednesday Play, in the episode titled "Fable" (aired 27 January 1965). He is known for his comedic roles in Love Thy Neighbour (Thames Television), The Thin Blue Line, which starred Rowan Atkinson, and in Ali G Indahouse. Walker also appeared in Doctor Who, in the 1969 serial The War Games, and also in several episodes of Empire Road in 1979. He was one of the first black actors to be seen regularly on British television, and so has always been proud of his role on the controversial Love Thy Neighbour, which ran for seven series, from 1972 to 1976.

Walker appeared in the first episode of the ITV sitcom On the Buses, "The Early Shift" (1969), and the first episode of Mr. Bean as "The Examiner" (1990). His other notable roles included as barrister Larry Scott in the 1985 BBC series Black Silk, by Mustapha Matura and Rudy Narayan.

Since 2001, Walker has played Patrick Trueman in the BBC One television soap opera EastEnders, for which role he was voted best actor in 2002 at the annual Ethnic Multicultural Media Awards, and in 2010 he appeared in the Internet spin-off series EastEnders: E20. He also starred in a BBC One sitcom called The Crouches, about a family from Walworth, in South-East London. He played the grandfather for both series (2003–2005).

Although much of his work has been on television, he has appeared in several movies, including 10 Rillington Place, King Ralph (along with his Love Thy Neighbour co-star, Jack Smethurst), and Let Him Have It. On the stage, Walker appeared in the first production of Mustapha Matura's Play Mas at the Royal Court Theatre in 1974, and has played the titular character in stage productions of Shakespeare's Othello, directed by David Thacker and Charles Marowitz, and also Caliban in a production of The Tempest directed by Jonathan Miller. Walker was also Gower in Thacker's 1989 production of Pericles, Prince of Tyre.

He also played opposite Diane Parish in Lovejoy (starring Ian McShane) where they played father and daughter.

Walker also lent his voice to the British children's television series Teletubbies, in which he renarrated the opening and closing sequences for the American dubbed version and voiced some of the voice trumpets for both the British and American versions.

His work on radio includes in 1997 reading a five-part abridgement by Margaret Busby on BBC Radio 4's Book at Bedtime, and presenting Hidden History: Universal Tongue (2001), produced by Pam Fraser Solomon. He also played the DJ in a BBC World Service adaptation of Wole Soyinka's Opera Woynosi.

Walker was the subject of This Is Your Life in 1999, when he was surprised by Michael Aspel on his 60th birthday at Lord's cricket ground.

A biography for children about Walker, written by Verna Wilkins, was published by Tamarind Books on 4 September 2008.

In 2018, he was awarded the Outstanding Achievement Award at The British Soap Awards, and in 2025, he won Best On-screen Partnership, which he shared with Angela Wynter.

== Personal life ==
Walker was married to Lorna Ross in 1968, but they divorced after having two children.

== Honours ==
Walker was appointed Officer of the Order of the British Empire (OBE) in the 2006 Birthday Honours for services to drama and Commander of the Order of the British Empire (CBE) in the 2020 New Year Honours for services to drama and charity.

== The Rudolph Walker Foundation ==
On Walker's 70th birthday, he launched The Rudolph Walker Foundation, whose aims include helping to provide opportunities and incentives for disadvantaged youths starting out in entertainment. The Foundation administers Rudolph Walker's inter-School Drama Award (RWiSDA), competed for by schools across London. In addition, Rudolph Walker's Role Model Award (RWRMA) is presented to outstanding students who have contributed something special, such as demonstrating positive leadership, a good influence to their peers and others, and a role model within the school.

== Filmography ==
=== Film ===
Year	Title	Role	Notes
1966	The Witches	Mark	Uncredited
1971	All the Right Noises	Gordon	
1971	10 Rillington Place	Beresford Brown	
1972	The Trouble with 2B		
1972	Universal Soldier	Mbote	
1973	Love Thy Neighbour	Bill Reynolds	
1973	Divorce His, Divorce Hers	Kaduna	
1973	A Warm December		Minor Role (Uncredited)
1973	Girl Stroke Boy	Mr Delaney	
1974	Man About the House	Rudolph Walker	
1982	Spaghetti House	Commander Martin	
1985	Black Silk	Larry Scott	
1991	King Ralph	King Mulambon of Zambezi	
1991	Let Him Have It	West Indian taxi driver	
1993	Bhaji on the Beach	Leonard Baptiste	
1993	Never Judge a Book by its Cover	Earl Taylor	
1997	The House of Angelo	Somers	
2002	Ali G Indahouse	President Mwepu	
2007	Hit for Six	Colin Thompson	

=== Television ===
Year	Title	Role	Notes
1965	The Wednesday Play	Policeman	Fable
1965	United!	Larry Presday	4 episodes
1967	Adam Adamant Lives!	Nikibu	Episode: "Face in a Mirror"
1968	Theatre 625	Madu	Wind Versus Psychology
1969	Doctor Who	Harper	Serial: The War Games
1969	Hadleigh	Smitty	Episode: M.Y.O.B.
1969	On The Buses	George	Episode: The Early Shift
1970	Diamond Crack Diamond	Henderson	Episode: "Diamonds and Spades"
1971	Say Hello to Yesterday	Man in A+E	Uncredited
1972	New Scotland Yard	Henry Buckingham	Episode: "A Case of Prejudice"
1972	Spyder's Web	General Limbo	Episode: "The Hafiz Affair"
1972–1976	Love Thy Neighbour	Bill Reynolds	Main role, 55 episodes
1976	The Fosters	Andrew Henderson	Episode: "Buy Now, Pay Later"
1978–1979	Empire Road	Sebastian Moses	5 episodes
1982	The Chinese Detective	Terence Villiers	Episode: "Wheels Between Wheels"
1985	Black Silk	Larry Scott	8 episodes
1987	The Lenny Henry Show	Sonny	Episode: "Sonny Sidles Up"
1988	Dramarama	Raven	Bogeyman
1990	Mr. Bean	The Invigilator	Episode: "Mr. Bean"
1990–1992	The Bill	Papa Reeves / Lawrence Joseph / Ivan Wilson	3 episodes
1991	For the Greater Good	Dr. Lawrence James	Episode: "Mandarin"
1991	Smack and Thistle	Churchill	Television film
1991	The Play on One	Kimumwe	Episode: "Escape from Kampala"
1991	Bodger and Badger	Mr. Valentino	3 episodes
1991	Pirate Prince	Thomas Newton	Television film
1993	Lovejoy	Earl Taylor	Episode: "Never Judge a Book by Its Cover"
1994	Scarlett	Ransom	Television film
1995–1996	The Thin Blue Line	PC Frank Gladstone	Main role, 14 episodes
1997–2001	Teletubbies	Male Voice Trumpet (voice); Opening and Closing Narrations (voice)	UK/USA Versions; USA Version; 352 episodes
2001	Doctors	Dennis Fisher	Episode: "Remembering"
2001–present	EastEnders	Patrick Trueman	Series regular
2003–2005	The Crouches	Grandpa Langley Crouch	2 series
2010	EastEnders: E20	Patrick Trueman	
2012	Celebrity Antiques Road Trip	Himself (Participant)	
2014	Invasion 1897		
2020	The Queen Vic Quiz Night	Patrick Trueman	Cameo appearance Charity crossover between Coronation Street and EastEnders

== Awards and nominations ==
Year	Award	Category	Result	Ref.
2002	TV Quick Awards	Best Soap Newcomer	Nominated	
2014	Inside Soap Awards	Best Actor	Nominated	
2015	The British Soap Awards	Best Actor	Nominated	
2018	British Soap Awards	Outstanding Achievement	Won	
2025	British Soap Awards	Best On-Screen Partnership (shared with Angela Wynter)	Won	
