= Face (novel) =

1999 British novel by Benjamin Zephaniah

- First edition
- Author: Benjamin Zephaniah
- Language: English
- Genre: Young Adult Fiction
- Publisher: Bloomsbury Publishing
- Publication place: United Kingdom
- Pages: 207
- ISBN: 1-58234-774-3

Face is a 1999 British novel by British-Jamaican author and poet Benjamin Zephaniah. It follows the story of Martin Turner, a teenager from East London, who suffers facial injuries after a joyriding accident after taking a ride home with his friend Mark from two drug addicts. Face has also been adapted as a stage play.

== Reception ==
Critical reception for Face has been mixed to positive, with Booklist saying "Martin's personal growth may lack literary finesse, but his struggle to overcome adversity will still involve some readers". Publishers Weekly praised the book's message but remarked that the plot was "somewhat formulaic".
