= Hsiao-Hung Pai =

British-Taiwanese journalist and writer

- 白曉紅
- Born: 白曉紅
- Education: Fu Jen Catholic University; University of Wales; University of Westminster, University of Durham
- Occupations: Journalist, writer
- Writing career
- Language: English, Chinese
- Notable awards: Shortlisted for Orwell Prize (2009); Winner of Bread and Roses Award (2013)

Hsiao-Hung Pai is a London-based British-Taiwanese journalist and writer. Her book Chinese Whispers: The True Story Behind Britain's Hidden Army of Labour was short-listed for the 2009 Orwell Prize and her Scattered Sand: The Story of China's Rural Migrants won the Bread and Roses Award in 2013.

Hsiao-Hung has written for The Guardian, OpenDemocracy, Red Pepper, Feminist Review, Socialist Review, Chinese Times UK, Chinese Weekly, The Storm (as a columnist), and other Chinese-language publications worldwide.

== Background ==
Hsiao-Hung Pai was born in Taiwan.

Pai has lived in the United Kingdom since 1991. She holds master's degrees (MA) in Critical & Cultural Theory (University of Wales, College of Cardiff), East Asian politics & history (University of Durham) and Journalism, with distinction (University of Westminster).

== Bibliography ==
- Chinese Whispers: The True Story Behind Britain's Hidden Army of Labour (Penguin Books 2008) ISBN 978-0-141-03568-0
- Scattered Sand: The Story of China's Rural Migrants (Verso Books, 2012) ISBN 978-1-781-68090-2
- Invisible: Britain's Migrant Sex Workers (Westbourne Press, 2013) ISBN 978-1-908-90606-9
- Angry White People: Coming Face-to-face with the British Far Right (Zed Books March 2016) ISBN 9781783606924
- Bordered Lives: How Europe Fails Refugees and Migrants (New Internationalist, January 2018) ISBN 978-1-78026-438-7
- Ciao Ousmane: The Hidden Exploitation of Italy's Migrant Workers (Hurst, January 2021) ISBN 9781787384699
- Are We Home: Loss, Identities and Belonging in the East End of London (Whitechapel Books, March 2026) ISBN 9781036955069
- Exile: The Journey of the Uyghur Diaspora (Ethics International Press, February 2026) ISBN 978-1-83711-772-7
