= Martin Glynn (criminologist) =

British poet and criminologist

Martin Glynn (born 1957) is a British poet, theatre director, cultural activist, and criminologist. As a poet Glynn is best known for his dub poetry performances.

== Life ==
Martin Glynn was born in "a modern slum" in Nottingham, to a white mother and black father of Jamaican heritage.

Glynn has written and directed performance works, as well as writing radio and theatre plays. He has also been an Arts Development Consultant, and founded BLAK (UK) (Being Liberated and Knowledgeable), an organization encouraging the arts as a tool for personal transformation.

His poem 'Tranes Blue Madness' is a tribute to John Coltrane. The poem's rhythm is modelled on Coltrane's bassline, with a relentless drive mirroring the persistence of mental depression.

Glynn gained a PhD from Birmingham City University in 2013, applying critical race theory to look at black men's desistance from crime.

In 2018 Glynn co-authored Revealed, a play exploring anger within a family spanning three generations of black men. Revealed premiered at mac in Birmingham in February 2018.

== Works ==
=== Plays ===
- (with Daniel Anderson) Revealed, 2018.

=== Non-fiction ===
- Black men, invisibility and crime: towards a critical race theory of desistance, 2013
- Speaking data and telling stories: data verbalization for researchers, 2019
