= Chinese Whispers: The True Story Behind Britain's Hidden Army of Labour =

2008 non-fiction book by Hsiao-Hung Pai

- Author: Hsiao-Hung Pai
- Publisher: Penguin Books
- Publication place: United Kingdom
- ISBN: 978-0-14-103568-0

Chinese Whispers: The True Story Behind Britain's Hidden Army of Labour is a non-fiction book by UK-based journalist and author Hsiao-Hung Pai, first published in 2008. It is about the lives of migrant workers from China in the UK. The book was shortlisted for the 2009 Orwell Prize and reviewed by The Wall Street Journal. To research the book, Pai went undercover.

== See also ==
- History of Chinese immigration to the United Kingdom
