= Chinwe Chukwuogo-Roy =

Nigerian visual artist (1952–2012)

Chinwe Chukwuogo-Roy MBE
- 1994 self-portrait
- Born: 2 May 1952; Awka (Oka), Anambra State, Nigeria
- Died: 17 December 2012 (aged 60); Hacheston, Suffolk, England
- Education: Hornsey College of Art
- Known for: Painting
- Spouse: Roderick Roy (m. 1980)
- Children: 3

Chinwe Ifeoma Chukwuogo-Roy MBE (2 May 1952 − 17 December 2012) was a visual artist who was born in Awka (Oka), Anambra State, Nigeria, but spent much of her young life in Ikom on the Cameroon border, before moving back to the family home at Umubele in Awka. She lived in Britain from 1975. Her paintings, prints and sculptures are predominantly figurative, in the genres of portraiture, still-life, landscape and narrative subjects. She won international attention in 2002 for being the first of only two Nigerian artists (the other being Ben Enwonwu) to have been allowed to paint official portraits of Queen Elizabeth II.

Chukwuogo-Roy was appointed Member of the Order of the British Empire (MBE) in the 2009 Birthday Honours.

== Early life and education ==
Chinwe Chukwuogo was born in Awka (Oka), Anambra State, Nigeria, but moved with her family to Ikom in Cross Rivers State, where her father had extensive cocoa plantations. She had six siblings. As a teenager she was a refugee in the Biafran War after which she moved to the family home in Awka Anambra State and in 1975 she moved to Britain. She studied at East Ham College and subsequently obtained a B.A. Hons. degree in Graphic Design from Hornsey College of Art (now part of Middlesex University) in 1978.

== Career ==
Golden Jubilee Portrait of Queen Elizabeth II, 2002

Water Moon Monotype by Chinwe Chukwuogo-Roy, 2005

Chukwuogo-Roy took up painting professionally in 1988. Her portrait of the 1990–2000 Commonwealth Secretary-General Emeka Anyaoku was unveiled by Queen Elizabeth II in 1999.

She gained international fame for painting the official Golden Jubilee portrait of Queen Elizabeth II, commissioned by The Commonwealth Secretariat in London. The full-length portrait was unveiled at a ceremony at Marlborough House in London by former Commonwealth Secretary-General Don McKinnon on Commonwealth Day, 2002. It hangs alongside the portrait of Commonwealth Secretary-General Emeka Anyaoku there.

Other high-profile commissions include portraits of Kriss Akabusi and the Lord Mayor of Norwich. Chukwuogo-Roy was commissioned by Martin Keown to paint Arsenal's Highbury Stadium in London.

In 2003, Chukwuogo-Roy represented the United Kingdom at the European Council Committee in Paris, France, advising on Contemporary African Art and Artists. In December that year, she also instigated and organised the Celebrate exhibition for the Commonwealth Heads of Government Meeting in Abuja.

Chukwuogo-Roy exhibited throughout Britain, as well as internationally. She had many solo exhibitions, including those at Christchurch Mansions, Ipswich; Ipswich Museum; The Mall Galleries, Bristol; The Royal Commonwealth Society; Reve's Cork Street Gallery, all in London; Sainsbury Centre for Visual Arts, University of East Anglia, both in Norwich; Aldeburgh Festival Gallery; Saatchi Gallery, both in Suffolk; and Suffolk Colchester, Connecticut University, Storrs, Connecticut; Didi Museum, Lagos; and UNESCO, Paris.

There has been a permanent exhibition of her work in the Menzies & Hancock Rooms at the University of London's School of Advanced Study since May 2006.

She was a founder member of the renowned Sudbourne Printmakers, involving several leading Suffolk artists.

In December 2012, after a lengthy illness with cancer, she died at her home in Hacheston, near Framlingham, Suffolk.

== Style and concepts ==
Chukwuogo-Roy created paintings, prints, and sculptures that are predominantly figurative, in the genres of portraiture, still-life, landscape, and narrative subjects. Her naturalistic portraiture is usually optimistic or celebratory in tone. However, she also created many works that, according to Sandra Gibson, writing for Nerve magazine, elicit "complex feelings of desperation, dread and aspiration". Notable among such works are her Migrants series and her African Slave Trade series.

== Recognition and awards ==
Chukwuogo-Roy won many awards and was featured prominently in the international media, both for her art and also for her charitable and educational work with young people. A biography entitled Chinwe Roy – Artist, published by Tamarind Books, is now studied by children in the UK as part of the National Curriculum.

In 2003, Chukwuogo-Roy was awarded an Honorary Doctorate of Letters by the University of East Anglia. In 2008, she was invited to address the Cambridge Union.

In 2010, Chukwuogo-Roy was appointed a Member of the Most Excellent Order of the British Empire (MBE) for her contributions to art.

== Collections ==
Examples of Chukwuogo-Roy's work are held in many public and private art collections, including that of Queen Elizabeth II, that of former President of Nigeria Olusegun Obasanjo and Geoffrey Watling, the president of Norwich City F.C. Her work is also represented in public and private collections in Antigua, Argentina, Australia, France, Grenada, Ireland, Kenya, Malaysia, Moçambique, the Netherlands, Nigeria, Portugal, South Africa, Spain, Swaziland, the United Arab Emirates, United Kingdom and the United States.

== Personal life ==
She married Roderick Roy in 1980. They had two sons, Rogan and Alasdair, and a daughter, Nwiru. They also have a grandson. Chukwuogo-Roy was an ardent Arsenal F.C. fan.

Chukwuogo-Roy was afflicted throughout her life by myasthenia gravis, an autoimmune disease that weakens the muscles, but she still managed to travel extensively.
