= Broadway Academy =

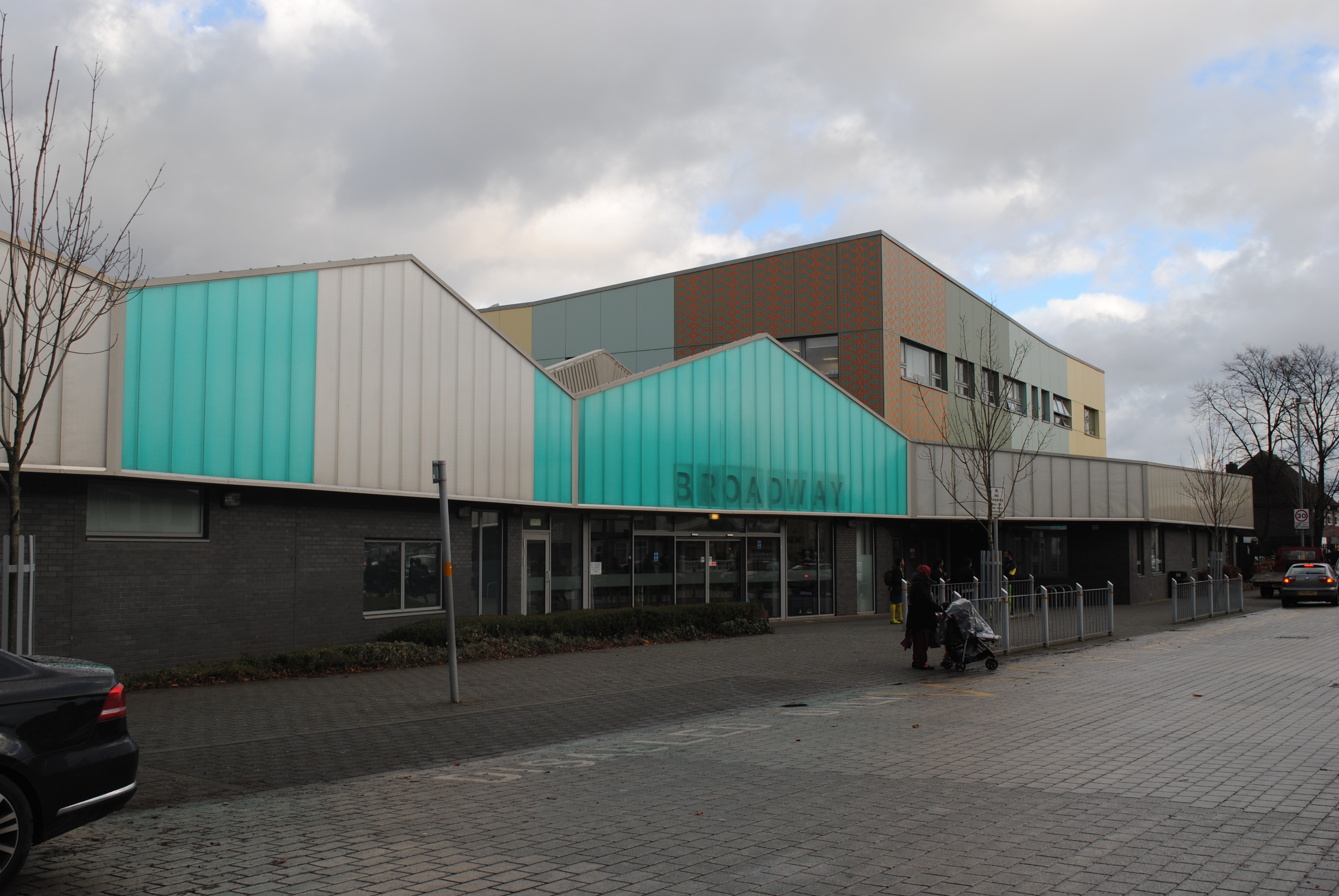

Location
- The Broadway; Perry Barr; Birmingham, West Midlands, B20 3DP; England; 52°30′47″N 1°53′44″W

Information
- Type: Academy
- Established: September 1972
- Department for Education URN: 139841 Tables
- Ofsted: Reports
- Chair of Governors: Joe Cahill
- Headteacher: Ron Skelton
- Gender: Coeducational
- Age: 11 to 19
- Houses: Austin, Bolton, Umar and Zakir.
- Website: http://www.broadway-academy.co.uk/

Broadway Academy (formerly Broadway School) is a coeducational secondary school and sixth form with academy status, located in the Perry Barr area of Birmingham, England.

Originally known as Broadway School, the school building was rebuilt in 2010 as part of the Building Schools for the Future programme. The new building was officially opened by the Prince Edward, Duke of Kent in 2011. The school converted to academy status in July 2013, and was renamed Broadway Academy.

== Notable pupils ==
- Benjamin Zephaniah (expelled age 13)
