= Henry Snell =

Henry Snell may refer to:

- Harry Snell, 1st Baron Snell (1865–1944), English politician
- Henry B. Snell (1858–1943), English-American painter
- Henry Saxon Snell (1831–1904), English architect
