= Harris Academy St John's Wood =

Location
- Marlborough Hill; St John's Wood, Greater London, NW8 0NL; England; 51.5378°N 0.1770°W

Information
- Type: Academy
- Motto: Dedication, Determination and Destiny
- Established: 1969 (community school); 2011 (academy); 2017 (Harris Academy, new name)
- Trust: Harris Federation
- Department for Education URN: 145126 Tables
- Ofsted: Reports
- Executive Principal: Nick Soar
- Headteacher: Samantha Green
- Gender: Mixed
- Age: 11 to 18
- Enrolment: 1266
- Colour: Pale blue
- Website: https://www.harrisstjohnswood.org.uk/

Harris Academy St John's Wood (formerly Quintin Kynaston) is a secondary school in St John's Wood, north London, that was re-named in 2017. It is a 7 form-entry (210 students) non-selective co-educational academy. Its predecessor Quintin Kynaston was founded in 1969 by the merger of Quintin Grammar School and Kynaston School. The earlier schools, which were built on the same site, opened in September 1956. It has been an academy school since November 2011. The school was rated as "Outstanding" in 2008 and 2011 by Ofsted, the English schools' inspectorate; however, in 2014 it was rated "Requires Improvement", and in April 2017 it was rated "Inadequate" and as a consequence was placed in special measures. It joined the Harris Federation Multi-Academy Trust in September 2017. In 2019, Ofsted ranked the Academy as 'good'.

== History ==
=== Original foundations ===
Quintin School was founded in 1886 by Quintin Hogg (grandfather of the mid-20th century politician of the same name) as the Polytechnic Secondary School, part of Regent Street Polytechnic. Named the Polytechnic Boys' Day School from 1886 to 1919, it was a voluntary aided school. Prior to 1956, in a different location, Kynaston had been known as Paddington Secondary Technical School.

=== Grammar and comprehensive schools ===
Quintin became a grammar school in 1944, and in 1946 was renamed the Quintin School after Quintin Hogg, who founded the Polytechnic at Regent Street in 1882 building on the legacy of the Royal Polytechnic Institution. It was a voluntary controlled school. A new building was built in 1956 in St John's Wood. It had around 550 boys.

In September 1956, Quintin's next-door neighbour, Kynaston School, opened as a county comprehensive, named after Kynaston Studd, a former president of the Royal Polytechnic at Regent Street and Lord Mayor of London. Kynaston School was among the small number of early comprehensive schools in the UK, which combined a non-restrictive admissions policy with, in essence, three kinds of education – roughly matching those found in grammar, secondary modern and technical schools. Kynaston was equipped with extensive technical laboratories, in part financed by corporate donations.

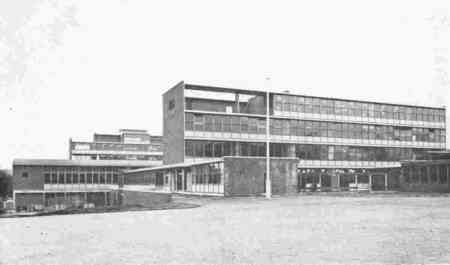
The Quintin School,1956

=== Merged school ===
Quintin and Kynaston merged in 1969 as a new comprehensive school named Quintin Kynaston School, and became co-educational in 1976. During the 1990s the school had issues usually associated with problem schools in inner city areas. It became a Specialist Technology College in 2001. In 2002, Joanna Shuter was appointed head teacher. The prime minister, Tony Blair, launched the "Extended Schools" scheme at Quintin Kynaston in September 2003 (Tony Blair visited the school again in 2006). It became a Foundation School in 2008, and an Academy in November 2011, keeping its name throughout as Quintin Kynaston School until 2015, when the school moved into new premises and renamed itself Quintin Kynaston.

=== Requires improvement to joining Harris Federation ===
The school lost its "outstanding" rating during the Ofsted inspection in September 2014. The school was judged as "requires improvement" because standards were not consistently in line with or above the national average in all subjects. The majority of the individual judgements were "good", including leadership and management, behaviour and safety and sixth form. In January 2017 Quintin Kynaston was inspected by Ofsted; the report published in April 2017 showed the school to be "Inadequate" in all areas apart from the Sixth Form which was deemed to be "Good". As a consequence of the failings Her Majesty's Chief Inspector was of the opinion that the school needed to be placed in special measures. It became part of the Harris Federation chain of academies which took over as sponsor in September 2017; the Quintin Kynaston name was lost and it became Harris Academy St John's Wood.

== Buildings ==
A new building, designed by van Heyningen and Haward Architects, opened on 12 January 2015. It is situated on Marlborough Hill next to the west side of the A41 in the north of the borough of Westminster in St John's Wood, close to the boundary with the Borough of Camden, and just south of South Hampstead railway station and the junction with the B509.

== Academics ==
The academy challenges the concept of an imposed curriculum citing Dylan William's education research.

The academy runs a three-year Key Stage 3 including years 7 to 9, and a two-year Key Stage 4 for years 10 and 11.

Key Stage 3 Curriculum

All subjects are taken by all students in Years 7 and 8. The languages studied are French and Spanish. In year 9 there is a degree of specialism, with student having a guided choice of two options which they may continue as exam subjects in years 10 and 11. These are studied in addition to the core subjects of English, maths, science, languages, humanities, PSHE and physical education.

== Media coverage ==
In May 2005, the school featured in a 30-minute BBC documentary, Head on the Block, made by the headteacher's sister Debbie Shuter. It was not broadcast as planned, because the BBC decided that the film broke its rules on objectivity.

After being named Headteacher of the Year in a Secondary School in 2007, and receiving a CBE in 2010, Shuter resigned in May 2013 and was replaced by Alex Atherton. In May 2014 Shuter was banned for life from the classroom by the National College for Teaching and Leadership after admitting the misuse of public funds on various personal expenses during her tenure. After an appeal, the decision was revised in November 2014 to allow Shuter to challenge the prohibition order, after two years. Early in 2017 the ban was overturned, leaving Shuter free to return to teaching.

In March 2015 Quintin Kynaston received unwelcome publicity with the revelation that Mohammed Emwazi, the ISIL killer who was portrayed in the media as "Jihadi John", had been a student at the school, leaving it in 2006. Three former students were involved in ISIL. Mohammed Sakr was killed by a US drone strike in Somalia in 2012 and Choukri Ellekhlifi was killed in Syria in 2013 fighting alongside fellow ISIS members. The Education Secretary, Nicky Morgan, ordered an investigation into the school.

== Quintin Kynaston School alumni ==
A new website was launched in 2017, covering the period from 1956 to 1975. There is an annual Kynaston / Quintin Kynaston school reunion.

== Academic performance ==
The school has successfully created many "school systems" that are now being used in other schools. In September 2004 the school received an excellent OFSTED report. The Section 5 Ofsted inspection of 10 December 2008 characterised QK as "an outstanding school and exceptionally well led by its inspirational headteacher".

It gets the third best GCSE results in Westminster LEA with above average results. Results at A-level are weaker – below the national average, however the school performs strongly in measures of contextual value added.-->

== Headteachers ==
Headteachers	Era	School
V. Butler-Smith	1886–1892	Polytechnic Day School for Boys
Charles Mitchell and David Woodhall	1892–c.1918	Polytechnic Commercial School and Polytechnic Technical School respectively
Percy Abbott	1919–1934	Polytechnic Secondary School
Frederick Wilkinson	1934–1937	Polytechnic Secondary School
Bernard Worsnop	1937–1958	Polytechnic Secondary School and The Quintin School
A. J. Holt	1958–1969	The Quintin School
T. G. Jones	1956–1959	Kynaston School
G. H. Harmer	1959–1969	Kynaston School
A. J. Holt	1969–1972	Quintin Kynaston School
Peter Mitchell	1972–1983	Quintin Kynaston School
Laurie Goodhand	1983–1986	Quintin Kynaston School
Sheila Madgwick	1987–1994	Quintin Kynaston School
Nicholas Elliott-Kemp	1994–2001	Quintin Kynaston School
Jo Shuter	2002–2013	Quintin Kynaston School / Community Academy
Alex Atherton	2014–2017	Quintin Kynaston Academy
Liam McGillicuddy and Chris Tomlinson	2017–2019	Quintin Kynaston Academy / Harris Academy St John's Wood
Graeme Smith	2019-2021	Harris Academy St John's Wood
Samantha Green	2021-	Harris Academy St John's Wood

== Notable former pupils ==
- Shola Ama, singer
- Architechs, band
- Tommy Baldwin, footballer
- Jak Beula entrepreneur and founder of Nubian Jak
- Richard Causton, composer
- Tulisa Contostavlos, from MOBO award-winning act N-Dubz, former The X Factor judge
- Mohammed Emwazi portrayed in the media as Jihadi John, an ISIL killer
- Fred Housego, taxi driver who went on to win Mastermind in 1980
- Ashley McKenzie Judo Olympian and Celebrity Big Brother contestant
- Stella Nova, guitarist
- Michael Page, professional boxer and mixed martial artist
- Dean Parrett, footballer
- Murad Qureshi, member of the London Assembly
- Suggs (Graham McPherson), musician Madness

=== Quintin School ===
- Elkan Allan, television producer and journalist
- Brian Butterworth, Professor of Cognitive Neuropsychology since 1992 at University College London
- Randolph Fields, helped to found Virgin Atlantic
- Andy Hopper CBE, serial entrepreneur, Professor of Computer Technology and Head of Department, Computer Laboratory since 2004 at the University of Cambridge, Professor of Communications from 1997 to 2004, and Research Director from 1979 to 1984 of Acorn Computers
- Martin Kilduff, currently Professor of Organizational Behaviour at UCL formerly Diageo Professor of Management Studies at the Judge Business School, University of Cambridge, 2008–12.
- John Leckie, record producer
- Harry Zvi Tabor, Israeli physicist and solar energy pioneer

=== Polytechnic Secondary School ===
- Terence Fox, chemical engineer; Shell Professor of Chemical Engineering, University of Cambridge, 1946–59.
- William Frankel, journalist
- David Gascoyne, poet
- Oswald Groenings, athlete
- Gerald Kersh, novelist
- Jack Parker (cricketer)
- Isidore Salmon CBE, Conservative MP from 1924 to 1941 for Harrow
- Albert John Trillo, Bishop of Chelmsford, 1971–85
- Richard Way CB CBE, Principal from 1975 to 1980 of King's College London
