= Jak Beula =

British entrepreneur and cultural activist (born 1963)

Jak Beula Dodd
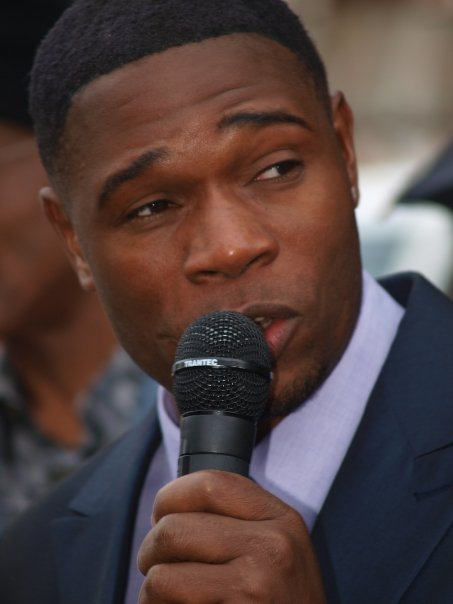
- Born: John Bubeula Dodd; 4 July 1963 (age 62); Paddington, London
- Other name: Jak Beula
- Known for: Entrepreneur and cultural activist
- Notable work: Nubian Jak board game; On Track 4 Gold; educational workshops; Nubian Jak Community Trust blue plaque schemes
- Awards: Black Arts Sports Enterprise (BASE) award (March 1995); MACE Award (December 2003); African Caribbean Enterprise (March 2005); Organisation Achievement Award, BEEAM (July 2007)
- Website: nubianjak.org

Jak Beula Dodd (born John Bubeula Dodd on 4 July 1963), commonly known as Jak Beula, is a British entrepreneur and cultural activist of Caribbean heritage, who is best known for inventing the board game Nubian Jak and designing the African and Caribbean War Memorial. He is also a musician, social-worker, and former model. Beula has received recognition for campaigning to commemorate black history in the UK. He is the founder and chief executive of the Nubian Jak Community Trust, which since 2006 has been memorializing the contributions of African-Caribbean people in Britain.

== Early life and career ==
Beula was born in London St Mary's Hospital in Paddington, to parents who were both from Jamaica, and he was raised and educated in the Paddington/Notting Hill area of West London. He had a religious early childhood, being raised by his grandmother, who wanted him to be a doctor. He attended Quintin Kynaston School, and has said (in a 2020 BBC Radio London interview with Vanessa Feltz) that in his schooldays he wanted to be a detective, a stunt man, and a singer.

His love for music led him to become a jazz musician and singer (with his 1980s band Stigma and 1990s band This Medusa); having grown dreadlocks, he also worked as a model, who between 1992 and 1995 featured in a successful long-running advertising campaign by Interflora.

== Social work ==
Becoming disillusioned with the music industry, Beula decided to go into social work. It was in his capacity as a social worker with Islington Council that he began to notice what he has described as society's neglect of black and white working-class youth in the social care system. Not only did it appear as if care staff were ill-equipped to deal with demands of the young people. Some of the young people were adopting sub-cultural stereotypical behaviour. Beula put this down to, in part, their educational experiences, as well as a lack of positive role models in both the media and their immediate environment. Noting that there were hardly any multi-cultural resources available within their homes, he has said:

"They were hungry for role models, because we all need a sense of identification, a sense of self and of self-esteem. Most of the role models they were being given in the media were negative and were stereotypes, it was very disappointing. So I decided to give the young people some new information, whether they wanted the information or not, I was going to give it to them."

He began to devise an educational programme that would try to address these points, out of which came the board game Nubian Jak. It immediately became a bestseller in London, prompting Beula to give up work as a social worker. By the end of 1996 educational magnates such as Time-Life were commenting on its innovation. In 1998 Beula self-published the first edition of Nubian Jak's Book of World Facts. Dubbed "the truth with proof", it was subtitled "The Ultimate Reference Guide to Global Black Achievement". In 2001 Beula signed a publishing deal with HarperCollins in New York to reissue the book.

A Nubian Jak phone app was released in 2016.

Beula was the founder of the Nubian Jak Community Trust (NJCT), Britain's only national BME commemorative plaque and sculpture scheme, which since 2006 has been honouring Black personalities of the past. Beula designed and organised the installation of Britain's first African and Caribbean War Memorial in Windrush Square. He also designed a statue to commemorate the contribution of Windrush and Commonwealth midwives and nurses to the National Health Service, which NJCT in collaboration with Whittington Health NHS Trust and Islington Council unveiled outside Whittington Hospital in September 2021, coinciding with the publication of a book compiled by Beula, entitled Nursing A Nation: An Anthology of African and Caribbean Contributions to Britain's Health Services. Speaking about the value of statues and memorials, he has said: "It helps to improve equality and inclusion, to uncover the stories of historic characters who have positively impacted Britain, but for whatever reason remain unknown, unsung and unheralded."

Beula worked alongside London 2012 with his innovated diversity project, On Track 4 Gold.

Beula was named on the 2020 list of 100 Great Black Britons.

== Bibliography ==
- Book of World Facts (Edutainment & Leisure, 1998).
- Book of World Facts (New York: Amistad Press, HarperCollins, 2002).
- Book of World Facts, Vol. 1 (London: Nu Jak Media, 2004).
