= Yvonne Conolly =

Jamaican teacher (1939–2021)

Cecile Yvonne Conolly CBE (1939 – 27 January 2021) was a Jamaican teacher, who became the United Kingdom's first female black headteacher in 1969, aged just 29-years-old. She arrived in the UK in 1963, as part of the Windrush generation, and went on to have a career in education that spanned over 40 years. In 2020, Conolly was made a CBE for services to education.

== Early years ==
Yvonne Conolly arrived in the UK from Jamaica in August 1963, as part of the Windrush generation, with just £36 in her pocket. She had trained for three years as a primary school teacher in Jamaica before taking the decision, with her ex-pat teacher friend Elizabeth Heybeard, to come to Britain on what at the time was described as a 'banana boat' – one of the many ships that brought over thousands of workers from the Caribbean.

Conolly later recalled, "I had had so much experience in things which were British history and literature. For example, I wanted to see daffodils, I had read a poem about daffodils and had never seen a daffodil. So, it was natural for me to come to England. There's something about the quality of Britishness which meant something for me which is why I thought this was going to be the best fit for me. I came on the 11 August 1963 on a very grey day. I was actually taken aback by the greyness and the houses, the red-bricks. I could see in fact, smoke coming from chimneys. I wondered what I had done because there was a lack of sunshine, a lack of blue skies, the closedness of houses, lack of space."

Undeterred, she moved to Canfield Gardens in West Hampstead, north London, where she took jobs as a babysitter, cleaner and typist, as well as securing work as a supply teacher.

== Teaching career ==
As a relief teacher, Conolly was very aware that there were racial tensions in a number of schools where she taught. This was to become even more evident to her as her teaching career progressed. Conolly was appointed teacher at the George Eliot School in Swiss Cottage, north London. Here, for five years, she excelled and eventually became deputy-head of the primary school; she had originally planned to return to Jamaica after three years. In January 1969, and much to her surprise, Conolly was offered a promotion to become headteacher at Ring Cross Primary School on Eden Grove in Holloway, Islington. At just 29-years of age, she was the country's first black female headteacher.

After being appointed to this position, Conolly received racist abuse and required a bodyguard to accompany her to work. Her appointment to the post attracted much attention from the British media, and she was subjected to repeated attacks in some national newspapers, as well as receiving hate mail at home. In an interview, she remembers, “When I was appointed as headteacher, somebody threatened to burn the school down. I had newspaper articles which had announced my appointment, sent to me, crossing out my photograph with nasty comments. Happily, the parents were only interested in whether their children would get a good education and that certainly was my focus.”

Conolly did not let the reaction to her headship prevent her from delivering an effective education service to the children of her school, and much of her experience at Ring Cross was to inform her later career. Carrying the responsibility of being the first-ever female black headteacher in the country, it was the reason she gave for setting up the Caribbean Teachers Association. This was to give confidence and practical advice to black teachers who wanted to become school heads. Conolly spent nine years as headteacher of Ring Cross Primary School and, in 1978, she left to take up a position as a member of the multi-ethnic inspectorate created by the ILEA (Inner London Education Authority). As an inspector she looked into how to deal with racism, in particular examining schools in Camden and Islington. In addition, she was an active voice in the home secretary's advisory council on race relations.

Conolly formally retired in 2001, after 40-years-of service in education, but remained chair of the Caribbean Teachers' Association.

== Death and legacy ==
Yvonne Conolly died of myeloma, an incurable blood cancer she had been fighting for more than 10 years, on Wednesday, 27 January 2021, at the Whittington Hospital, Islington, aged 81 years. She is survived by her daughter and grandson.

The UK's Department of Education described her as a “history maker” and “an inspiration [who] leaves a lasting legacy.”

A former Times Educational Supplement editor hailed Conolly as an influential educator and a supportive colleague.

== Honours and recognition ==
In October 2020 Conolly was honoured for her services to education with the Honorary Fellow of Education award from the Naz Legacy Foundation. HRH Prince of Wales, Prince Charles, who announced Connolly's award, said that she had “character and determination” which helped her break barriers for black educators.

In the Queen's Birthday Honours in October 2020, Conolly was made a CBE (Commander of the British Empire) for services to education. In receiving the award, she said: "I am delighted, and feel profoundly honoured to be receiving a CBE for the recognition of my work in education over many years. I am most grateful to my nominees and to the Honours Committee for this prestigious award which I am proud to share with my community.“

Yvonne Conolly is also remembered in Islington where, near to her home in Finsbury Park, the 'Yvonne Conolly Garden' in Wray Crescent Park was dedicated to her in 2019. In 2021, she was posthumously award the Freedom of the Borough of Islington Award "for her contributions to education and to recognize her trailblazing role for young Black women in Islington."
