= Michael Palin Centre for Stammering =

Specialist centre for speech and language therapy for stammering in London, England

The Michael Palin Centre for Stammering is a specialist centre for speech and language therapy for stammering in London, England. It officially opened in 1993 as a joint initiative between the charity Association for Research into Stammering in Childhood (now Action for Stammering Children) and the Camden & Islington Community Health Services NHS Trust. It is now run by the Whittington Health NHS Trust with support from Action for Stammering Children and the Stuttering Foundation of America. It is located in Pine Street, central London.

The actor Michael Palin, whose father stammered, agreed for the centre to be named after him following his role in the film A Fish Called Wanda, in which he portrayed Ken, a character who stammered. Palin's continued support and involvement has helped create a high profile for the centre.

Children, young people and adults who stammer, both from across the UK and from overseas, are seen by the specialist speech therapists at the centre, either face to face or using telehealth. Assessments for children from the UK are charitably funded. Funding for therapy for UK residents may be sought from the NHS and private therapy is also available.

The Centre runs a comprehensive training programme for therapists and a research programme into stammering.
