= Mabel Clint =

Canadian wartime nurse

- Born: June 21, 1874; Quebec City, Quebec
- Died: March 17, 1939 (aged 64); Montreal, Quebec
- Military career
- Allegiance: Canada
- Branch: Canadian Expeditionary Force
- Service years: 1914–1916; 1917–1919
- Rank: Sister
- Unit: Canadian Army Medical Corps
- Conflicts: First World War
- Awards: Associate Royal Red Cross

Mabel Brown Clint, ARRC (June 21, 1874 – March 17, 1939) was a Canadian nurse and author. She served with the Canadian Expeditionary Force in France, Belgium, and Greece during the First World War. Born in Quebec, she worked as a nurse and volunteered for duty when war was declared in 1914. She embarked for the United Kingdom with the first set of troops and was among the first 100 nurses to serve near the Western Front in France. She published her memoir, Our Bit: Memories of War Service by a Canadian Nursing-Sister, in 1934.

== Early life ==
Clint was born in Quebec City, Quebec, in 1874. Her father, William Clint, was an Englishman working as an insurance agent. Her mother, Caroline Brown, was Scottish. She had two sisters, Olive and Effie.

In her early twenties, Clint worked as a writer. Using the pen name Harold Saxon, she published two non-fiction books, Under the king's bastion; a romance of Quebec, comprising many true and interesting historical sketches and descriptions of the customs and habits of the people of Quebec, ancient and modern (1902), and Imperial Anniversary Book (1909).

== Nursing career ==
Clint decided to enter the nursing profession and in 1910 graduated from the Royal Victoria Hospital in Montreal. In 1914, when war was declared, Clint volunteered for duty with the Canadian Army Medical Corps and was assigned to No. 1 Canadian General Hospital Battalion. She sailed for England on September 29, 1914, aboard RMS Franconia. When she arrived, she briefly resided at St. Thomas's Hospital in London. She was sent to No. 1 Canadian General Hospital in Boulogne on May 13, 1915, where she stayed about two months. She was then sent to the Greek island of Lemnos where she was assigned to the 3rd Canadian Stationary Hospital nursing wounded from the Gallipoli campaign.

The hospital was part of a relief effort to aid the ANZAC medical staff who were overwhelmed with the casualties from the fighting at Gallipoli. The Canadians were unprepared for the conditions on Lemnos, and several of the medical staff including Clint became sick with dysentery. Complications led to her becoming seriously ill, and she was hospitalized in Cairo in February 1916. She returned to Canada in June for convalescence but was unable to return to army nursing and was invalided out of the service in November. In appreciation for her contribution to the war effort she was awarded the Royal Red Cross, 2nd class.

After a year of recuperation, Clint re-enlisted and was sent back to England in December 1917; she was posted to No. 16 Canadian General Hospital. In February 1918, she was transferred to France, joining the team of the No. 4 Casualty Clearing Station. On April 3, 1918, she was awarded "One Red, 2 Blue Service Chevrons." After the war ended she returned to Canada in 1919 and resumed her nursing career.

In 1934, Clint recounted her wartime experiences in a memoir, Our Bit: Memories of War Service by a Canadian Nursing-Sister, which was published in 1934. She spent another year in England in 1930 but lived most of the rest of her life in Quebec, where she died in 1939.
