= Anna Scher Theatre =

Performing arts school

The Anna Scher Theatre School
- Type: Independent, Performing Arts School, Charity
- Established: 1968; 58 years ago
- Affiliations: St Silas Church, Islington
- Principal: Anna Scher
- Students: ~1,000
- Location: Islington, Greater London, England
- Website: www.annaschertheatre.com

The Anna Scher Theatre is an independent and co-educational performing arts school based in Islington, Greater London. It was founded in 1968 by Anna Scher. It is considered among the first schools of its kind geared towards working class students.

== Theatre school ==
In 1968, Scher started an extracurricular performing arts school at Islington's Ecclesbourne Primary School. 70 pupils came the first week, including future Birds of a Feather stars Pauline Quirke (aged 9), Linda Robson (aged 10) and Ray Burdis (aged 11). In 1970, the classes moved across the road to a council hall in Bentham Court on Ecclesbourne Road. By 1975 she had 1,000 pupils and 5,000 on the waiting list, so moved to the custom converted mission hall on Barnsbury Road in 1976, when the performing arts school was established as an independent charity.

Scher's teaching style produces what critics call a natural delivery, but Scher comments that she just uses their natural voice. Of her improvisation technique, she told Simon Hattenstone of The Guardian in 2004:

I fell into that quite by chance – necessity is nearly always the mother of invention, and because 70 turned up and because a lot weren't too hot at reading, improvisation fell into place.

In 2000, Scher suffered ill health through depression and stepped down during her recovery period.

In 2005, the remaining staff and board set up a new school but Anna Scher went on to continue her theatre school under her own name at the nearby Blessed Sacrament Church Hall, Islington. Since 2009, the Anna Scher Theatre has been teaching from the St Silas Church in Islington and classes are run twice a week. Anna Scher stepped down as a teacher in 2020, and since then classes have been run by former student, and actor, Dickon Tolson.

== Alumni ==
Alumni include: Henry Paker, Pauline Quirke, Linda Robson, Kathy Burke, Phil Daniels, James Alexandrou and Natalie Cassidy. Other alumni from EastEnders include: Gary Hailes, Martin Kemp, Gillian Taylforth, Patsy Palmer, Sid Owen, Joe Swash, Jake Wood, Susan Tully, Tilly Vosburgh, Brooke Kinsella and Tameka Empson. Other alumni include: Adam Deacon, Zawe Ashton, Hayley Angel Holt, Reggie Yates, and Daniel Kaluuya, Ricardo P Lloyd and Freema Agyeman.

== Literature ==
- Anna Scher (1988), Desperate to Act, Collins, ISBN 978-0-00-672852-8.
- Anna Scher & Charles Verrall (1975),100+ Ideas for Drama, Heinemann Educational, ISBN 978-0-435-18799-6.
- Anna Scher & Charles Verrall (1976), First Act: Drama Kit, Ward Lock Educational, ISBN 978-0-7062-3546-3.
- Anna Scher & Charles Verrall (1987), Another 100+ Ideas for Drama, Heinemann Educational, ISBN 978-0-435-18800-9.
- Anna Scher & Charles Verrall (1992), 200+ Ideas for Drama, Heinemann Educational, ISBN 978-0-435-08606-0.
