= Archway Hospital =

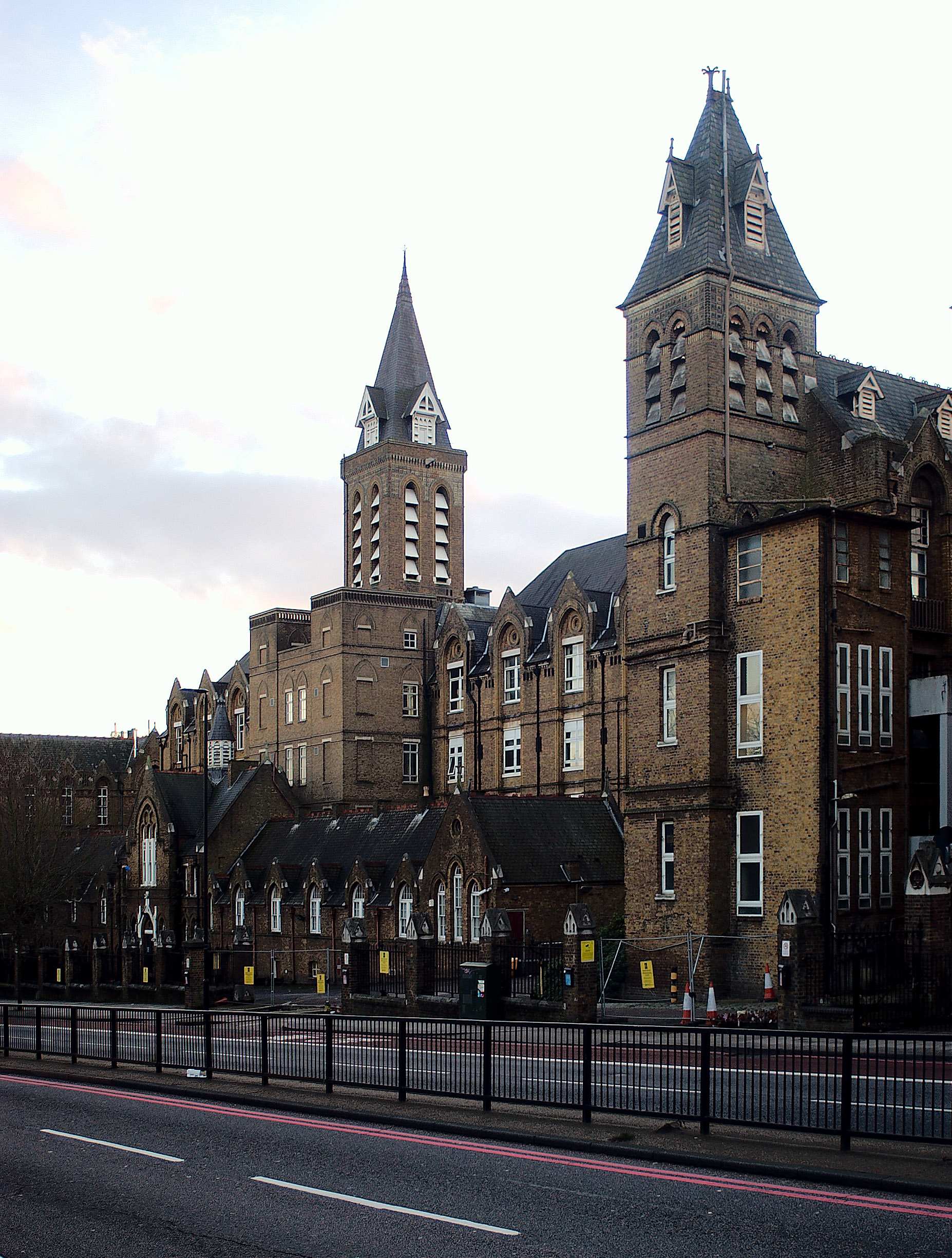
- Archway Hospital

- Shown in Camden

Geography
- Location: Archway Road, Highgate, London
- Coordinates: 51.5671°N 0.1361°W

Organisation
- Care system: National Health Service
- Type: General

History
- Founded: 1879
- Closed: 1948

Badge for nurses who trained at the LCC Archway Hospital

Archway Hospital was a name used to refer to the infirmary building which opened in 1879 on Archway Road in Archway, London.

== History ==
The facility has its origins in the Holborn Union Infirmary, which was designed by Henry Saxon Snell and opened in 1879. It became the Holborn and Finsbury Hospital in 1921.

In 1928, the hospital took over the Prudential Assurance Company's Furnival House hostel for domestic servants in Cholmeley Park for use as a nurses' home.

The hospital was taken over by the London County Council in 1930 and renamed Archway Hospital.

At the time of transfer to the London County Council the hospital had 628 beds. The Medical Superintendent was Dr Thomas Evans, MD, DPH, the matron was Miss ER Wain and the steward MR AM Jennings.

It became the Archway Wing of the Whittington Hospital on the establishment of the NHS in 1948.

In 1998, the Archway Wing was jointly purchased by University College London and Middlesex University to form the Archway campus. The teaching and research facility closed in 2013 and the site was sold to the Peabody Trust for redevelopment. In 2021, Peabody sold the site to SevenCapital for redevelopment.

== See also ==
- Highgate Hospital
