= List of recipients of the Freedom of the Borough of Islington =

People who have received the highest award given by the Borough of Islington, London

The Freedom of the Borough of Islington in London, England is awarded to people the Islington Council recognizes have "made an outstanding contribution to the community." It is the highest honor the Council can bestow.

Prior to 1965, the current London borough was made up of two separate metropolitan boroughs: the Metropolitan Borough of Islington and the Metropolitan Borough of Finsbury, with separate awards for each.

== Freepersons of the London Borough of Islington ==
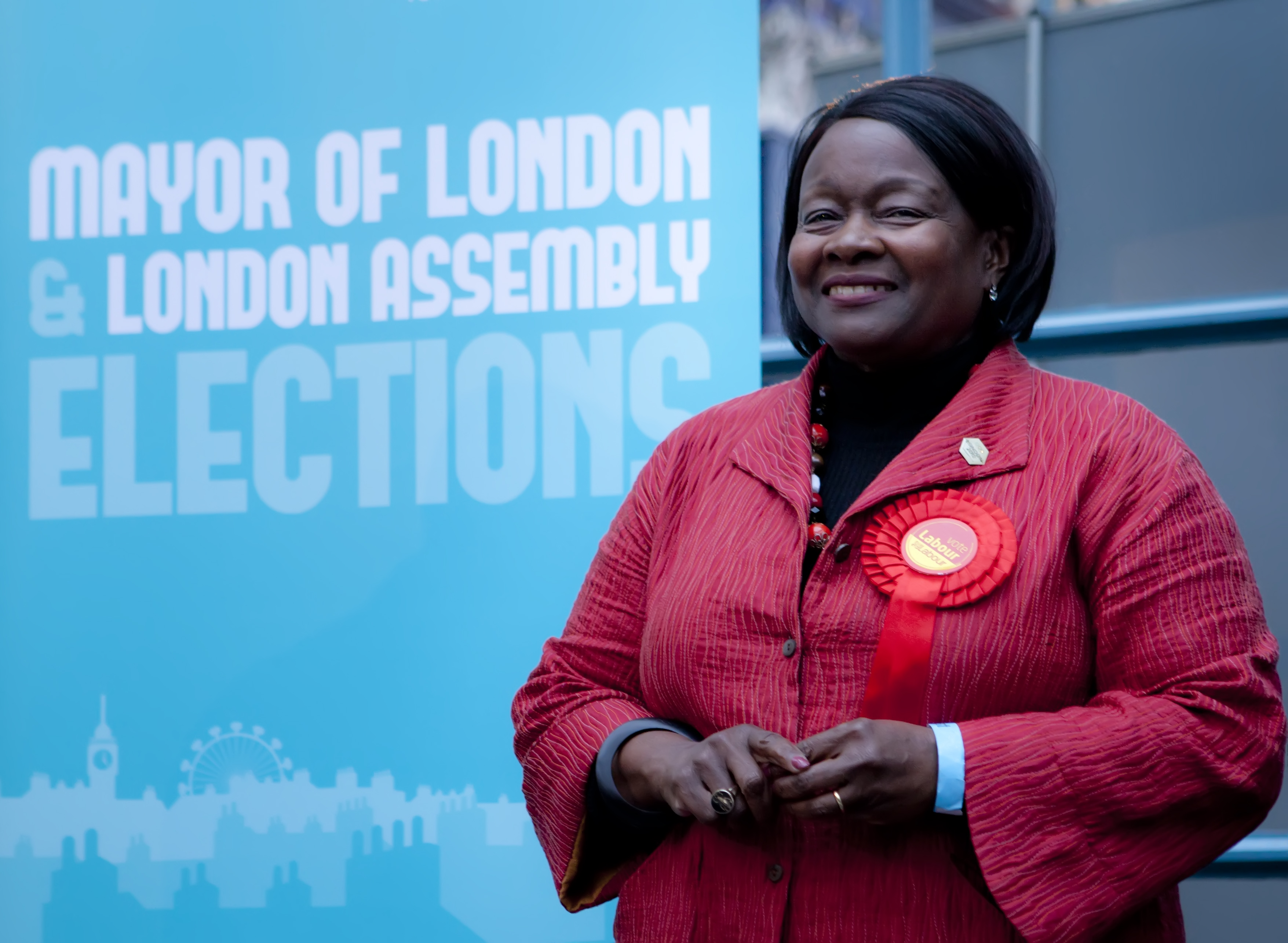
Jennette Arnold. Arnold first came to Islington as a child of the Windrush generation, and went on to serve in the Islington Council, and London Assembly. She was awarded the Freedom in 2021.

=== 2021 ===
- Jennette Arnold OBE
- Yvonne Conolly CBI (posthumously)
- London Ambulance Service NHS Trust
- The Whittington Health NHS Trust

=== 2018 ===
- The Officers and Firefighters of Islington and Holloway Fire Stations
- John and Darren Walters, the Pearly King and Prince of Finsbury

=== 2015 ===
- Islington Veterans' Association
- George Durack

=== 2013 ===
- Mary Gibson MBE JP
- Truda White
- Jean Ellen Willson OBE
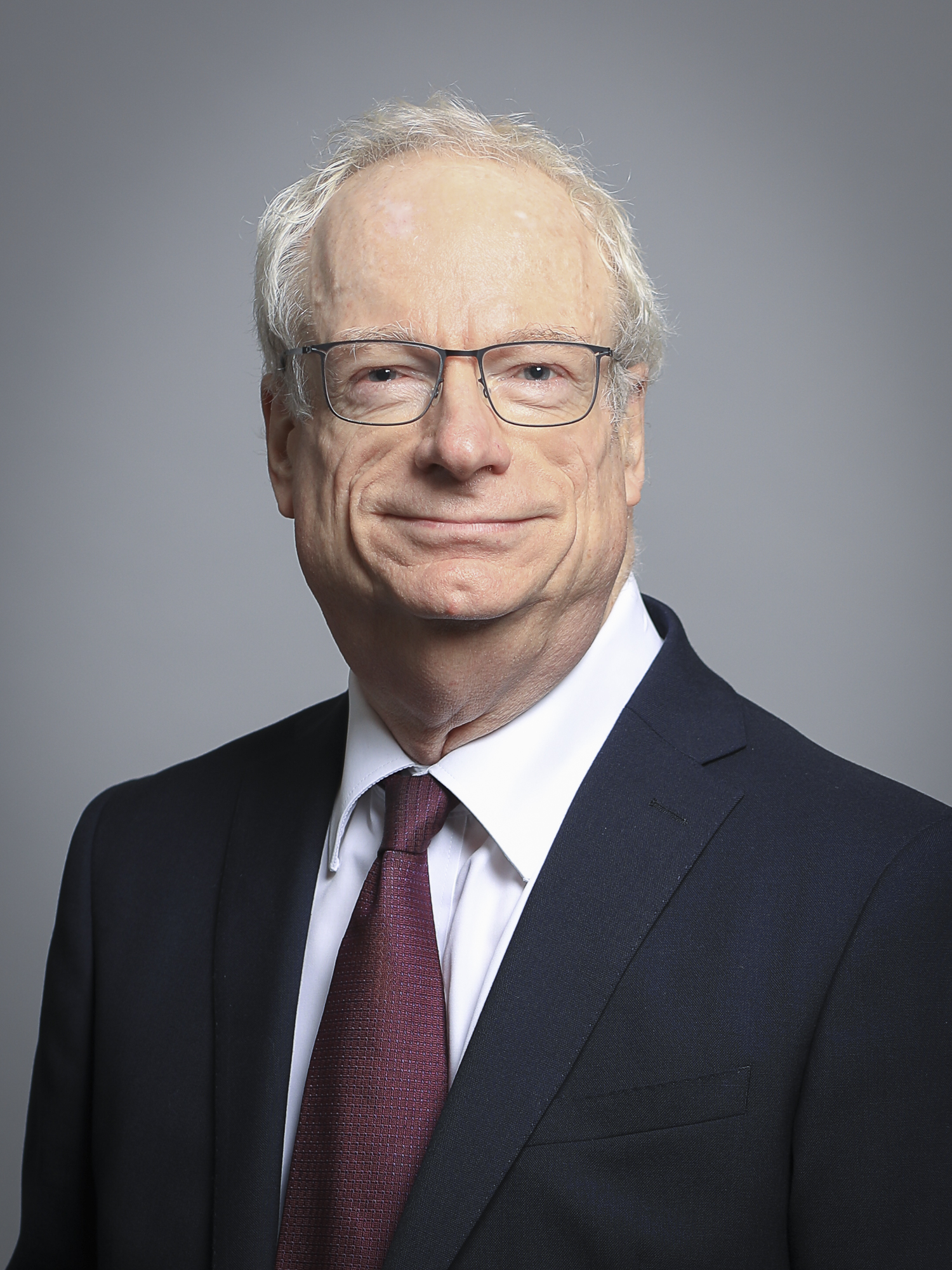
  Lord Chris Smith of Finsbury. Born in Barnet, Smith served as Councillor and MP of Islington, and Secretary of State for Culture, Media and Sport. He became the first openly gay male MP in 1984. He was awarded the Freedom in 2010.

=== 2010 ===
- Lord Chris Smith of Finsbury
- Father Jim Kennedy
- Col. Brian Kay OBE TD DL FRSA

=== 2009 ===
- Honourable Artillery Company

=== 2007 ===
- Arsenal Ladies FC

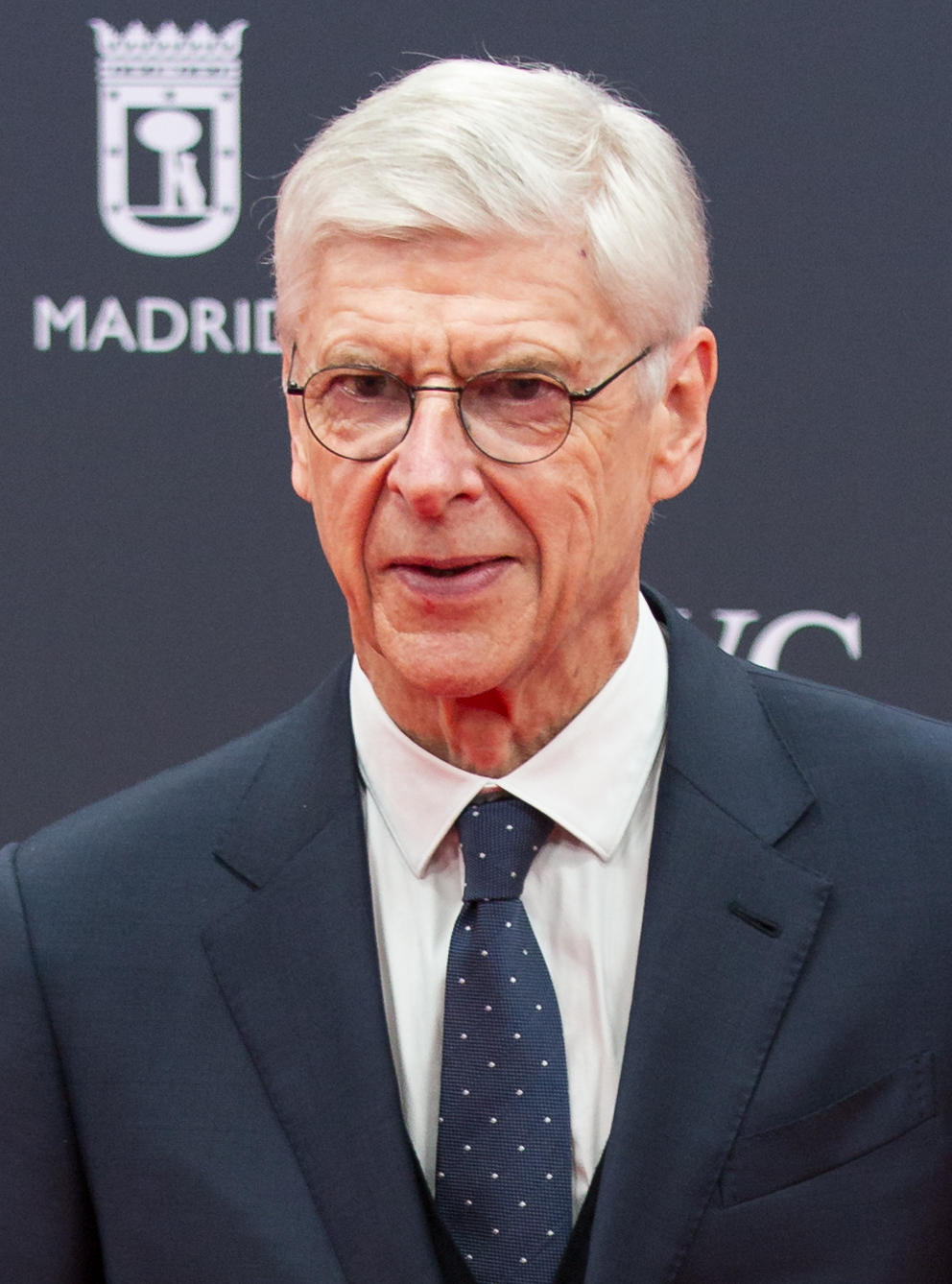
Arsène Wenger. Wenger was the manager of Arsenal from 1996 to 2018, where he was the longest-serving and most successful in the club's history. He was awarded the Freedom in 2004.

=== 2004 ===
- Ken Friar OBE
- Arsène Wenger

=== 2003 ===
- The Morris Family
- Anna Scher
- Mrs Ann Mullins BA FRSA

=== 2000 ===
- Christopher John Goodall

=== 1996 ===
- Eric Dear

=== 1994 ===
- Liz McKeon
- George Graham

=== 1989 ===
- Cllr Arthur Bell

=== 1983 ===
- Mrs Catherine Griffiths

=== 1974 ===
- Cllr Albert Edward Smith

=== 1971 ===
- Arsenal Football Club

=== 1966 ===
- Alderman D Gwyn Jones CBE JP

== Freemen of the Metropolitan Borough of Islington (pre-1965) ==
=== 1953 ===
- Mrs Jessie Leonte Blythe JP

=== 1937 ===
- Councillor Henry George Coleman JP

=== 1932 ===
- Alderman William Edwin Manchester JP

=== 1928 ===
- Alderman Sir Thomas Wakelin Saint JP

== Freemen of the Metropolitan Borough of Finsbury (pre-1965) ==
=== 1965 ===
- Alderman Arthur James Coman
- Alderman Ernest Frederick Johnson

=== 1963 ===
- Alderman Charles Alfred Allen JP

=== 1961 ===
- Councillor Charles Henry Simmons

=== 1953 ===
- Alderman Mrs Eleanor Kate Allen
- Alderman William Francis Drake Esq.
- Alderman Austin George Webb Esq.

=== 1948 ===
- Alderman Dr Chuni Lal Katial MNBS DTMLM

=== 1946 ===
- Alderman Owen Morris Richards Esq.

=== 1928 ===
- Alderman Enos Howes JP

== See also ==
- Islington Council
- Members of Islington Metropolitan Borough Council
- List of mayors of Metropolitan Borough of Finsbury
