= Trevor Clay =

English nurse and trade unionist (1936–1994)

Trevor Clay CBE, FRCN
- Born: 10 May 1936; Nuneaton, Warwickshire, England
- Died: 23 April 1994 (aged 57); Harefield, Middlesex
- Occupation: Nurse
- Employer: Royal College of Nursing
- Known for: Nurse leader
- Notable work: Nurses: Power and Politics, 1987

Reginald Trevor Clay, CBE, FRCN (10 May 1936 – 23 April 1994) was an English nurse and former General Secretary of the Royal College of Nursing (RCN). His obituary in the Times described him as the most influential nurse of his times.

== Early life ==
Reginald Clay, known as Trevor, was born in Nuneaton, Warwickshire, England, the eldest of the six children of Joseph and Florence Clay.

== Nursing career ==
Clay registered as a nurse in 1957 after training at Nuneaton General Hospital. He then went on to train as a Mental Health Nurse at the Bethlem and Maudsley Hospitals in London, registering in 1960. Clay became one of the first men in nursing to join the Royal College of Nursing when it opened its membership to men in 1960. He was a staff nurse, then charge nurse, working with David Stafford-Clark on psychotherapy services at Guys Hospital. He then took up post as assistant matron in the new psychiatric department of the Queen Elizabeth II Hospital at Welwyn Garden City. In 1969 he was appointed matron at the Whittington Hospital. In the NHS reorganisation of nursing management, following the Salmon Report, Clay was appointed in 1970 chief nursing officer to the North London Hospital management committee, with responsibility for fourteen hospitals. He was subsequently appointed area nursing officer for Camden and Islington Area Health Authority in 1974.

== General Secretary of the Royal College of Nursing (1982-1989) ==
It was as General Secretary of the RCN, beginning in 1982, that he became a public trade union official and negotiator. He had been Deputy Secretary since 1979 but was not a public figure.

In 1982, almost at the outset of his tenure he began negotiations with the UK government over a labour disagreement concerning nurses' salaries, then at yearly levels of no more than £5,833. As a result, a "Pay Review Body" characterized by autonomous operation was created; the compensation of the nurses he represented was also increased. Clay had two other notable achievements while leading the RCN: the acceptance of the government in May 1988 of proposals to reform nurse training; the implementation in the NHS of a revised clinical grading structure for the nursing profession.

Clay was diagnosed with severe emphysema at the age of 37. With a membership in excess of 285,000 at the time of Clay's pensioning off due to illness in September 1989, no labour organisation unaffiliated with the Trades Union Congress surpassed the RCN in size, and none had a greater rate of expansion. He was made a Fellow of the Royal College of Nursing in 1985.

== Later life ==
Clay retired from the RCN due to his declining health. The occasion was marked with a reception in the Banqueting Hall, Whitehall which was attended by, amongst others, Kenneth Clarke, secretary of state for health, and Princess Margaret. In retirement he was active as vice president of the International Council of Nurses and in founding a Breathe Easy Society, with the British Lung Foundation. Clay's respiratory disease claimed his life, aged 57, in 1994. A memorial service was held at St.Paul's Cathedral, attended by, amongst others, the Secretary of State for Health Sir Norman Fowler; Baroness Cox; Baroness Cumberledge;, Lord Hayhoe; Lord Moore; Dame Jocelyn Barrows; Sir Donald Acheson; Dame Audrey Emerton; Dame Phylis Friend; Dame Catherine Hall; Dame Kathleen Raven and Sir Rodney Sweetnam

== Awards and honours ==
Clay was made a Fellow of the Royal College of Nursing in 1985.

He was appointed Commander of the Order of the British Empire (CBE) in 1990.

== Writing ==
He authored the following books:

- The Workings of the Nursing and Midwifery Advisory Committee in the National Health Service, 1974
- Nurses: power and politics, 1987, Butterworth-Heinemann, London
