= Highgate Hospital =

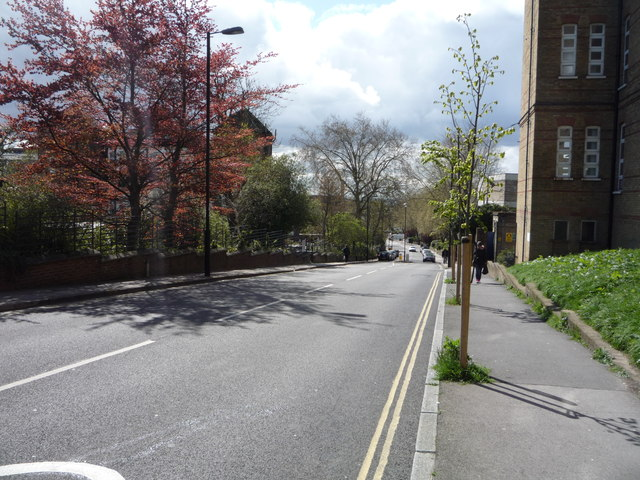
- Highgate Wing (on the right)

- Shown in Camden

Geography
- Location: Dartmouth Park Hill, Highgate, London, UK
- Coordinates: 51.56674°N 0.14234°W

Organisation
- Care system: National Health Service
- Type: General

History
- Founded: 1869
- Closed: 1948

Highgate Hospital was a name used to refer to the infirmary building which opened in 1869 on the St Pancras side of Dartmouth Park Hill in Highgate, London.

== History ==
The facility has its origins in the St Pancras Union Infirmary, which was designed by Giles and Biven and opened in 1866.

Florence Nightingale advised the architects on the design of the building and later commented that it was "by far the best of any workhouse infirmary we have" and indeed "the finest metropolitan hospital".

In 1869, Central London Sick Asylum District was altered to include St Pancras and the infirmary became known as Central London Sick Asylum. This arrangement continued until 1893, when it reverted to the Guardians of the Poor as St Pancras North Infirmary, while the St Pancras Union Workhouse on King's Way (now St Pancras Way) became St Pancras South Infirmary. Edith Cavell served as night superintendent from 1901 to 1904, when she was the only trained nurse on duty.

The hospital was taken over by the London County Council in 1930 and renamed Highgate Hospital. At the time of the transfer to London County Hospital the medical superintendent was C Thackery, MD, BS (London), the steward WH Lees. The matron was Miss R Jones RRC (Royal Red Cross). It became the Highgate Wing of the Whittington Hospital on the establishment of the NHS in 1948.

Latterly a psychiatric hospital, in 2004, the Highgate Wing was chosen by Camden and Islington Community NHS Trust as the site for Highgate Mental Health Centre and the consolidation and development of community mental health and adult social care services.

== Notable staff ==
Between 1883 and 1924 many of the senior nursing staff at the infirmary had trained or worked at The London Hospital under Matron Eva Luckes.

- Ellen Jean Moir (1847–1925), Matron of St Pancras Infirmary from 1883 until 1910. Previously Moir had worked at the Royal Infirmary Edinburgh, as a Private Nurse of The Westminster Hospital, and Night Sister at The London Hospital, Whitechapel under Luckes. Luckes recommended Moir for the position at St Pancras Infirmary. Moir was a member of the Workhouse Infirmary Nursing Association. She was a member of the Poor Law Matrons Association. Edith Cavell was Night Superintendent here under Moir, for two years between 1901 and 1903. After Moir's retirement another Londoner, Selina Spittle was appointed matron.
- Frances Selina Spittle (1872–1950), Matron of St Pancras Infirmary from 1910 until she married in 1922. Before that she was firstly Home Sister (in charge of the nurses home) at the infirmary from 1907, Assistant Matron from March 1908 and appointed Matron in September 1910. Spittle trained between 1901 and 1903. She worked at The London as a Staff Nurse, Holiday Sister and Matron's Office Sister until she gained promotion at St Pancras. She was a member of the Poor Law Matrons Association, a professional body established to improve standards within Poor Law infirmaries. Nurses such as Moir and Spittle helped disseminate professional nursing into Poor Law Infirmaries. After Spittle resigned to marry, Janet Thorpe who had also trained at The London was appointed matron.
- Janet Thorpe (1875–1924). Matron of St Pancras Infirmary from 1922 until her death in 1924 from gastric influenza. Before her appointment as matron, Thorpe was employed as a Home Sister with an expertise in Massage Therapy (the precursor to Physiotherapy) at the infirmary from 1908, and then Assistant Matron from 1910 to 1922. Thorpe trained between 1901 and 1903. After her training Thorpe was a nurse in The London Hospital's Private Nursing Institution, and then a Massage Sister, before she moved to St Pancras.

Badges for nurses who trained at the hospital

== See also ==
- Archway Hospital
