= African and Caribbean War Memorial =

War memorial in Brixton, London

Coordinates: 51.4605°N 0.1148°W

- United Kingdom
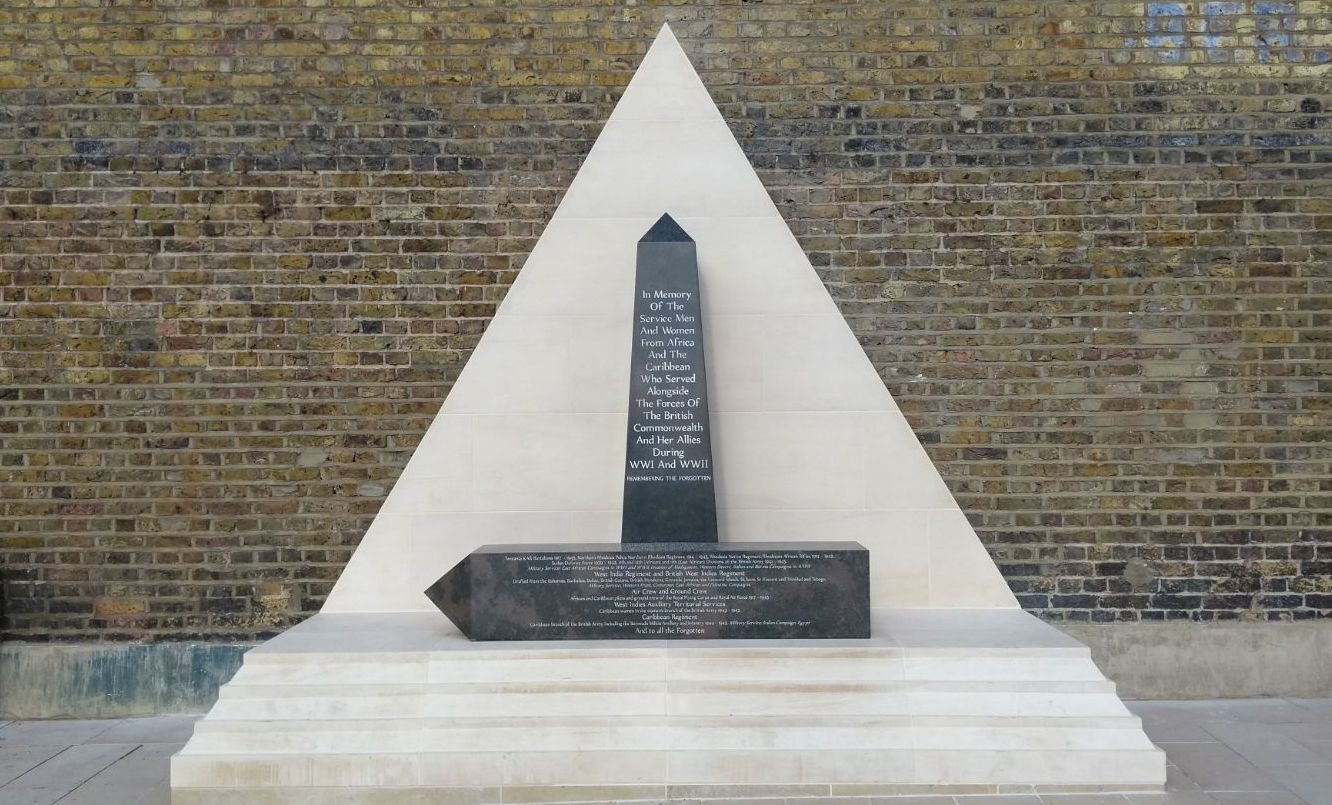
- For servicemen from Africa and the Caribbean who served alongside British and Commonwealth Forces in First World War and Second World War
- Unveiled: 22 June 2017
- Location: Windrush Square, Brixton, London, U.K.
- Designed by: Jak Beula, Nubian Jak Community Trust
- Website: acmemorial.uk

The African and Caribbean War Memorial in Brixton, London, is the United Kingdom's national memorial to African and Caribbean service personnel who fought in the First and Second World Wars. It originated with a project for a memorial to Caribbean Royal Air Force veterans of World War II who arrived in Britain in 1948 on the MV Empire Windrush; this was an extension of the commemorative plaque and sculpture scheme run by the Nubian Jak Community Trust to highlight the historic contributions of Black and minority ethnic people in Britain. The memorial was originally to have been placed at Tilbury Docks, as part of the commemoration for the centenary of the outbreak of World War I. However, as the project began to evolve into a larger tribute that included both World Wars and commemorated servicemen and women from both Africa and the Caribbean, it was agreed by the memorial recipient – the Port of Tilbury – and the project organisers that a new, more accessible location needed to found. The memorial was ultimately permanently installed and unveiled on 22 June 2017 in Windrush Square, Brixton.

== Background ==
While the Imperial War Museum holds records for almost 70,000 memorials to the First and Second World Wars in the UK, there was not one memorial specifically dedicated to commemorating the contributions to victory made by more than two million servicemen and -women from the Caribbean and Africa in both World Wars, until the initiation of the African and Caribbean War Memorial project by the Nubian Jak Community Trust. This set out to address the historical omissions made about African and Caribbean military participation and to remedy the neglect and oversight.

== Location ==
After exploring a number of potential sites, including the National Memorial Arboretum in Staffordshire and the South Bank and Peckham Square in London, and having consulted local stakeholders, the Trust finally settled on Windrush Square in the heart of Brixton, South London. The area has a strong connection with African and Caribbean culture and history, since the arrival on the MV Empire Windrush at Tilbury, near London, on 22 June 1948, bringing the first large group of West Indian migrants to the UK, among them many former servicemen. The arrivals were temporarily housed in the Clapham South deep shelter in southwest London, about two miles away from Coldharbour Lane in Brixton. Many only intended to stay in Britain for a few years, and although a number returned to the Caribbean, the majority remained to settle permanently.

The African and Caribbean War Memorial was temporarily displayed outside the Black Cultural Archives, 1 Windrush Square, Brixton, at 11:11 am, on 11 November 2014, at an Armistice Day ceremony — attended by veteran Sam King (1926–2016) among others — marking the centenary of World War I.

== Design ==
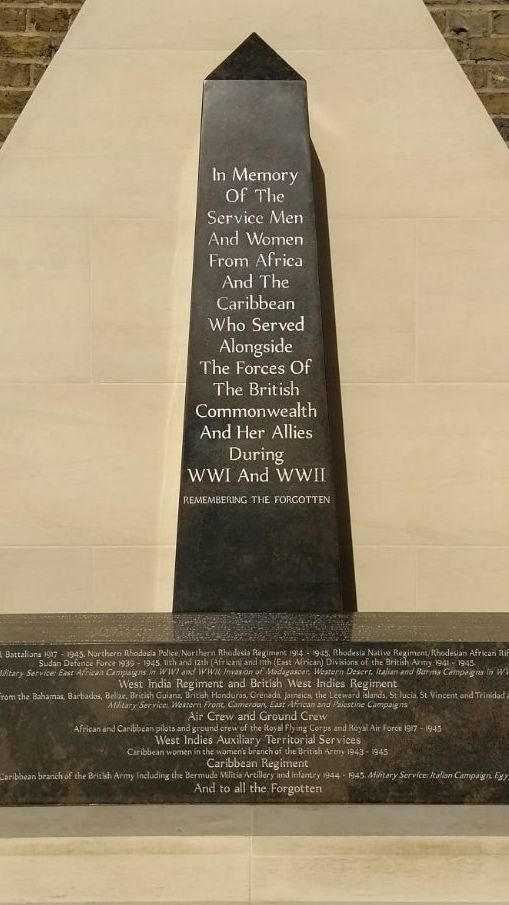

The African and Caribbean War Memorial was designed by Jak Beula of the Nubian Jak Community Trust. It consists of two 6-foot obelisks made from Scottish whinstone, weighing approximately 0.75 tons. It is inscribed with the name of every regiment from Africa and the Caribbean who served in World Wars I and II, as well as where they served, and when. It also includes a pyramidal plinth made from Ancaster stone and weighing just under 1.5 tons (combined weight 3 tons). The memorial is supported by Lambeth Council, the Department of Communities and Local Government, the Foreign and Commonwealth Office, the Heritage Lottery Fund, the Black Cultural Archives, Madstone Limited, the Association of West Indian Personnel and a number of community stakeholders.

Inscribed on the memorial are the names of every regiment from Africa and the Caribbean that contributed services to both world wars, and the words:

In Memory Of The Service Men And Women From Africa And The Caribbean Who Served Alongside The Forces Of The British Commonwealth And Her Allies During WW1 and WW2

== Installation and unveiling ==
The memorial was in storage after November 2014, while two planning applications were submitted, and fundraising efforts made to cover the cost of its manufacture, plinth design and installation ceremony (which had originally planned for Armistice Day in November 2016). Planning permission was finally granted on 28 September 2016. When the Prince of Wales visited the Black Cultural Archives in February 2017 and was made aware of the memorial, he said in a speech:

"It's so encouraging that now, at last, you have a centre such as this, which allows you to develop so many opportunities but also to bring the message to so many people in this country and elsewhere about the remarkable contribution made over so long, by people of African and Caribbean descent who have contributed so much to this country."

The date chosen for the African and Caribbean War Memorial to be permanently installed in Windrush Square was 22 June 2017, when an unveiling and dedication ceremony was held. Other associated activities included a play, Remembered, at the Paul Robeson Theatre in Hounslow, West London, and the launch of a book entitled Remembered: In Memoriam, an anthology of essays, articles and narratives about African and Caribbean experiences during and in the aftermath of the world wars, compiled by Jak Beula and Nairobi Thompson. In a letter of support to the Nubian Jak Community Trust, Queen Elizabeth II said: "It is now over 70 years since the end of that war, but it is just as important to remember the ultimate sacrifice made by those men and women who were prepared to lay down their live for our freedoms."

The unveiling ceremony was attended by war veterans, Commonwealth High Commissioners and other dignitaries, as well as members of the public. Jak Beula said: "More than two million African and Caribbean military servicemen and servicewomen participated in the two world wars but they have not been recognised for their contribution. The unveiling of this memorial is to correct this historical omission and to ensure young people of African and Caribbean descent are aware of the valuable input their forefathers had in the two world wars."

The Voice newspaper reported:

"Proceedings opened with instrumental offerings from the Ministry of Defence (MOD) military band, London All Stars Steel Orchestra and African and Caribbean drummers. These were followed by neutral prayer, delivered by two children, as well as a Christian prayer and a Muslim one. A libation was given by Professor Gus John, a priest of African traditional religious persuasion – an ode to the diverse beliefs nurtured across this country. The ceremony began with a spectacular, traditional military salute and a display of flag and ensigns for each regiment by commonwealth defence representatives of land, air and sea. This was followed by African commemorative war music and dance. Medals were given out to the ex-servicemen and women who made extraordinary contributions to the war effort and public life."

Those named as being honoured with medals were Alhaji Grunshi, Lionel Turpin, Walter Tull, William Robinson Clarke, Cy Grant, Ulric Cross, Sam King, Una Marson, Charles Drew, Norma Best and Allan Wilmot. Present to receive his medal in person, 93-year-old veteran Wilmot (former member of 1950s group The Southlanders), said: "I'm glad that I'm still alive to witness it (the recognition)." Also in attendance was the Defence Secretary Michael Fallon, who said that the recognition is long overdue: "The UK is indebted to all those servicemen and women from Africa and the Caribbean who volunteered to serve with Britain during the First and Second World Wars. It is thanks to their bravery and sacrifice that we are able to enjoy our freedoms today. We should also congratulate those who have worked tirelessly to place this memorial in the heart of Brixton." Mayor of London Sadiq Khan spoke in his address of the "courageous African and Caribbean men and women who fought with the British army during the First and Second World War", noting: "As a society we must never forget the sacrifices they made. It's vital that we pass this on to future generations, connecting children with their history."

== Remembrance Sunday ==
In November 2017, the Nubian Jak Community Trust (NJCT) inaugurated a Remembrance Sunday multi-denominational commemorative ceremony in Windrush Square, including a military parade, African drumming, libation, and speeches in honour of those from Africa and the Caribbean who lost their lives fighting alongside the British and Commonwealth forces in both world wars, as well as in other global conflicts, the culmination of the event being the laying of wreaths at the African and Caribbean War Memorial.

Thereafter, veterans have been honoured at an annual event organised by the Nubian Jak Community Trust, in association with the Black Cultural Archives, continuing to centre the Memorial on Remembrance Sunday, with the "combined passion and determination" of these local organisations attracting support from the Ministry of Defence and Lambeth Council, as a British Army report on the 2024 event noted. Drawing a wide community presence, the ceremony became recognised, according to a 2021 article about the event (which resumed after being scaled down due to COVID-19 pandemic restrictions), "as Europe's premier event remembering the contribution of African and Caribbean soldiers in both World Wars", attended by "war veterans, in-service men, and women, cadets, dignitaries – including ambassadorial representatives from Commonwealth countries, members of the House Lords, Members of Parliament as well as the general public." In 2024, organisers NJCT were joined in delivering the Remembrance Sunday ceremony by the West Indian Association of Service Personnel (WASP) and Friends of Windrush Square, supported by the Ministry of Defence and Lambeth Council.

== "I Have a Song: Memorial Aid Project" ==
In support of the memorial, a fundraising single entitled "I Have A Song", composed and performed by Eric Roberson and Jak Beula, was launched at the Houses of Parliament in 2016. Nonagenarian veteran Allan Wilmot had a starring role in the video of the song, which also featured many artists representing reggae, hip-hop, Afro Beat and world music.
