= John Dossetor =

Canadian physician and bioethicist (1925–2020)

John Beamish Dossetor
- Born: 19 July 1925; Bangalore, India
- Died: 6 April 2020 (aged 94); Ottawa, Ontario, Canada
- Occupations: physician and bioethicist
- Known for: co–coordinating the first kidney transplant in Canada and the Commonwealth
- Awards: Order of Canada

John Beamish Dossetor, OC (19 July 1925 – 6 April 2020) was a Canadian physician and bioethicist who is notable for co–coordinating the first kidney transplant in Canada and the Commonwealth.

== Biography ==
Born in Bangalore, India, Dossetor attended Marlborough College in Wiltshire before receiving a B.M. and B.Ch. from St John's College, Oxford in 1950. In 1955, he immigrated to Canada to accept a position at McGill University. From 1960 to 1969, he worked at the Royal Victoria Hospital.

In 1994, he was made an Officer of the Order of Canada. He was awarded the 125th Anniversary of the Confederation of Canada Medal. Dossetor died in Ottawa, Ontario on 6 April 2020 at the age of 94.

== Medical ethics ==
In his 2005 book Beyond the Hippocratic Oath: A Memoir on the Rise of Modern Medical Ethics, Dossetor describes his oversight of skin graft experiments in Igloolik for the International Biological Program in the early 1970s. Dossetor describes his reaction to reading an account of the experiment from one of the test subjects years later, and his disturbed realization with hindsight that the consent process for this research, which had depended on "group consent from community elders" granted via a non-Inuk translator, had been "inadequate in that subjects...did not understand what was going on". He ultimately concludes in the book that his team did not do enough to secure meaningful consent, and expresses his concern that a careful, fully informed consent process is "still not considered crucially important even in research today".

In 2019, several Inuit from Igloolik spoke out about the skin grafts and other medical experiments conducted on them without consent in the 1960s and 1970s and initiated legal action against the Government of Canada.
