= Edward William Archibald =

Canadian surgeon

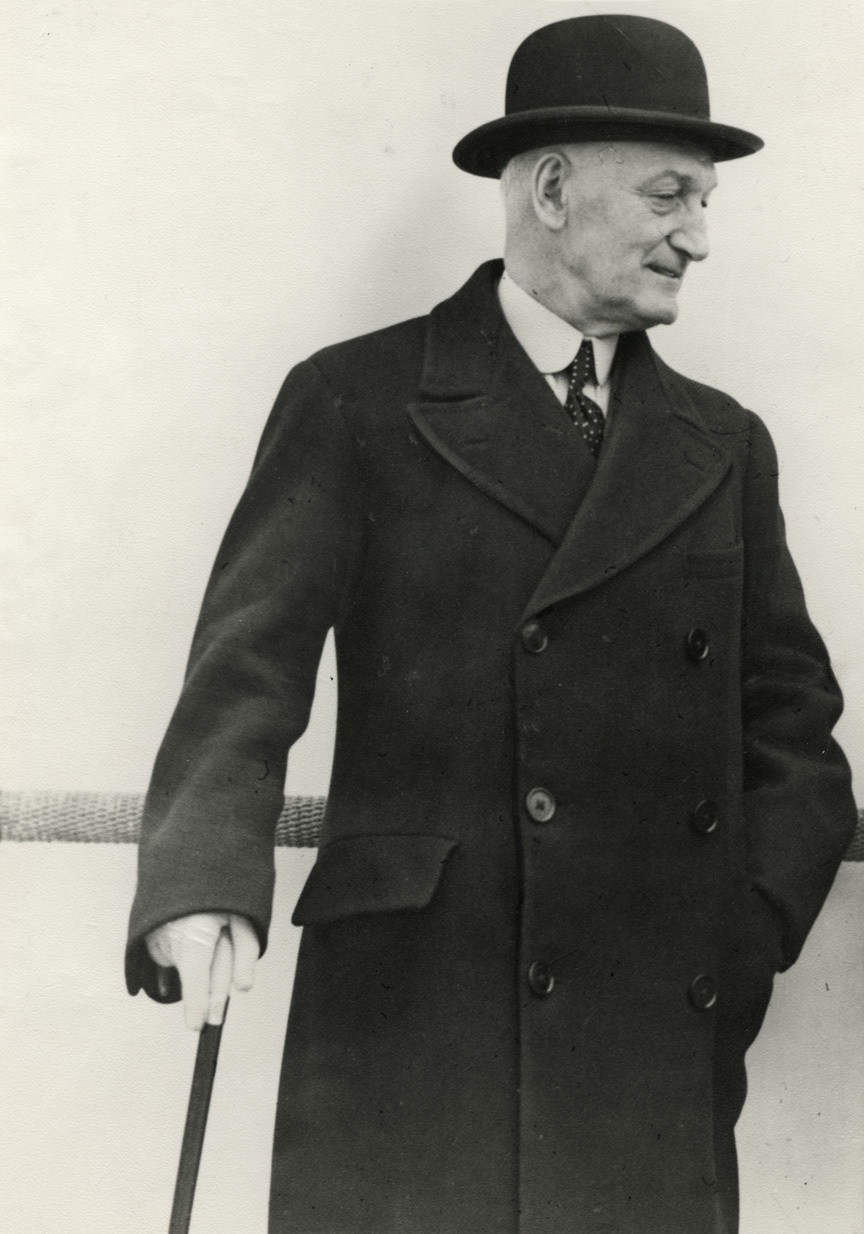
- Born: August 5, 1872; Montreal, Quebec, Canada
- Died: December 17, 1945 (aged 73); Montreal, Quebec, Canada
- Occupation: Surgeon

Edward William Archibald (August 5, 1872 – December 17, 1945) was a Canadian surgeon. Archibald was born in Montreal, Quebec, and received his initial education in Grenoble, France. Upon returning to Canada, he attended McGill University, receiving his Doctor of Medicine there in 1896. Archibald became interested in the specialist field of surgery, and began an apprenticeship at Royal Victoria Hospital. After a year in Europe studying under two well known physicians (Jan Mikulicz-Radecki, Victor Horsley), the young surgeon was appointed to the staff of the Royal Victoria Hospital's Department of Surgical Pathology. However, Archibald became ill with tuberculosis, and moved to New York City for treatment. Upon his recovery, the surgeon returned to Royal Victoria Hospital. There, he developed what he had learned in Europe, and came to be dubbed Canada's first neurosurgeon.

In 1908, Archibald published a monograph, Surgical Affection and Wounds of the Head, but left neuroscience to combat the public health issue of tuberculosis. During World War I, the surgeon served in France as a military hospital doctor, and upon his return to Canada attempted to develop Canada's standard of education for surgeons, which he saw as declining. In 1935, Archibald became president of the American Surgical Association, and delivered a speech that is considered to have been the trigger for reforms of the standard of surgeon education in the United States. Archibald died on December 17, 1945, in Montreal. During his 73-year life, the surgeon had several medals, fellowships and even an honorary doctorate bestowed upon him.

== Early life ==
Edward William Archibald was born on August 5, 1872, in Montreal, Quebec, to father John Sprott Archibald and mother Ellen Hutchison. The young Edward's family had moved around a great deal before he was born, with his ancestors first living in Scotland, then moving through Ireland, New Hampshire, Nova Scotia and eventually Quebec. His parents insisted that all their children experience a foreign culture experience, with the added benefit of becoming bilingual. To this end, the young Archibald was sent to Grenoble, France by his parents to study upon reaching adolescence. In 1888, after returning to Canada, Archibald entered the McGill University Faculty of Arts, graduating from there with a Bachelor of Arts in 1892. He continued at McGill, entering medical school and graduating with a Doctor of Medicine in 1896. There, he became interested in the medical specialisation field of surgery, and although the invention of general anaesthesia and other technological improvements made surgery a fast-moving field, Archibald said that he opted to become a surgeon due to the logic involved and the application of theoretical knowledge in practice. The young doctor began his surgical career with a three-year program at McGill University, with what was essentially an apprenticeship in the field at Royal Victoria Hospital, which had opened only a few years earlier. Archibald also spent a year in Europe, where he studied under the guidance of Ludwig Aschoff and Jan Mikulicz-Radecki. He was impressed the most by the surgical methods of the latter, which were groundbreaking for the time.

== Early career ==
In 1901, Archibald was appointed as a staff member at the Royal Victoria Hospital Department of Surgical Pathology. However, soon after he entered this position, the surgeon began to develop a cough, lose weight and experience fatigue. These symptoms were confirmed to be as a result of tuberculosis by the hospital's Chief of Medicine, and Archibald moved to the Adirondack Cottage Sanitarium in upstate New York to experience a change of climate. The surgeon returned to Canada upon his recovery, and in 1904 was appointed to the Royal Victoria Hospital's department of surgery. The same year, Archibald married Agnes Maud Black Barron. The head of that department, a Dr. Ruddick, encouraged Archibald to develop the new practices he had learned during his time in Europe, and his work in this field has led to many dubbing him Canada's first neurosurgeon. In 1908, Archibald published Surgical Affection and Wounds of the Head, a monograph that was at the time considered to be the most comprehensive text on the subject.

== Research, education and later years ==
Archibald's work in investigating the disease of pancreatitis led to the development of the sphincterotomy, a procedure still in use today. His earlier experience with tuberculosis prompted him to look beyond neurosurgery into other areas of the body, and his work in fighting tuberculosis led to the refining of thoracic surgery. When World War I began, Archibald went with the No. 3 Canadian General Hospital (McGill) to France, where he was able to apply his experience in combating the disease to the patients he encountered on the war front. The surgeon was also greatly interested in the education of new surgeons, and believed that the standard of doctor education had been declining, leaving incapable surgeons to perform procedures. Archibald returned to McGill University, this time as a staff member in the Department of Surgery, and revitalised it following almost thirty years of stagnation. In 1929, he served as a member of the first Royal College of Surgeons of Canada Examining Board in Surgery, and after becoming president of the American Surgical Association in 1935, made a speech entitled Higher Degrees in the Profession of Surgery, triggering the formation of the American Board of Surgery. On June 26, 1936, he gave a talk at the 67th Annual Meeting of the Canadian Medical Association. He was also considered a key influence in the surgical education of Norman Bethune, however he reportedly disapproved of Bethune and his actions. Additionally, he was a mentor to Wilder Penfield, another famous physician who worked at the Royal Victoria Hospital.

Archibald died on December 17, 1945, in Montreal. By the end of his life, the surgeon had been bestowed the Trudeau Medal of the National Tuberculosis Association and the Boston Surgical Society's Bigelow Medal. He was an Honorary Fellow of the Royal Australasian College of Surgeons, an Honorary Fellow of the Royal College of Surgeons of England and the recipient of an honorary Doctor of Medicine by the University of Paris. Archibald had published several scholarly papers on his experiences and research, including Observations upon shock, with particular reference to the condition as seen in war surgery (1917), A note upon the employment of blood transfusion in war surgery (1916), Further data concerning the experimental production of pancreatitis (1921) and A brief survey of some experiences in the surgery of the present war (1916). However, despite the mental demands of his profession, Archibald was described in his obituary as being "a... distressingly absent-minded character". His archives are held at McGill University, in the Osler Library of the History of Medicine and the McGill University Archives.
