= Whittington Hospital =

NHS hospital in London

- Whittington Health NHS Trust
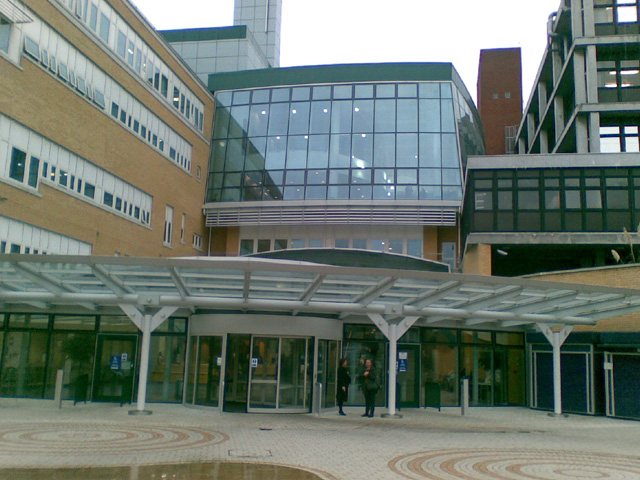
- The main entrance on Magdala Avenue

- Location within Islington

Geography
- Location: Archway, London, London, N19, England, United Kingdom
- Coordinates: 51.5665°N 0.1395°W

Organisation
- Care system: NHS England
- Type: Acute hospital trust
- Affiliated university: University College London

Services
- Emergency department: Yes Accident & Emergency
- Beds: 360

History
- Founded: 1473 activity on site 1848 current hospital

Links
- Website: www.whittington.nhs.uk
- Lists: Hospitals in England

Whittington Hospital is a district general and teaching hospital of UCL Medical School and Middlesex University School of Health and Social Sciences. Located in Archway, London, it is managed by Whittington Health NHS Trust, operating as Whittington Health, an integrated care organisation providing hospital and community health services in the north London boroughs of Islington and Haringey. Its Jenner Building, a former smallpox hospital, is a Grade II listed building.

== History ==
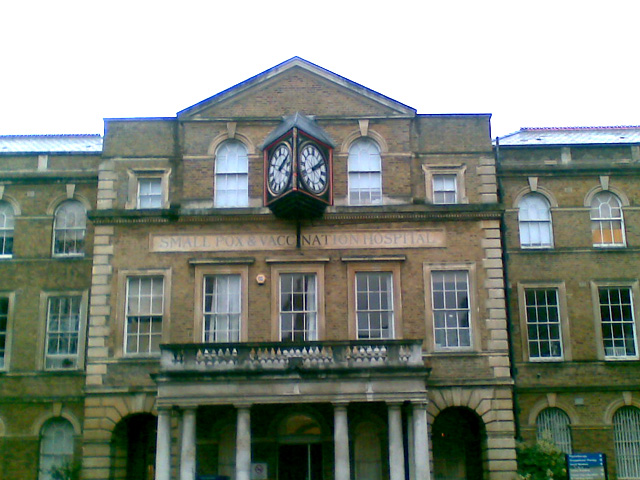
The former smallpox hospital viewed from the south

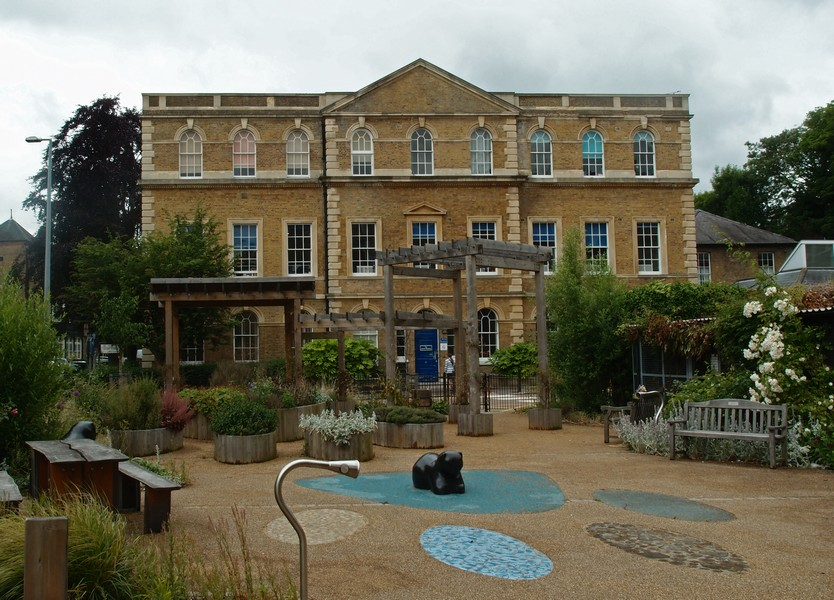
The former smallpox hospital viewed from the east

The first hospital on the site was St Anthony's Chapel and Lazar House, a facility built for lepers in 1473. It closed during the Dissolution of the Monasteries in the mid-16th century.

The current hospital has its origins in the Small Pox and Vaccination Hospital, built in 1848. It was designed by the architect Samuel Daukes as one of two isolation hospitals in London (the other was the London Fever Hospital in Liverpool Road) intended to care for smallpox patients during the epidemic at that time. The hospital, instituted in 1746, was removed from the original central London site to make way for the building of King’s Cross station.

After smallpox treatment services transferred to Clare Hall Manor at South Mimms in 1896, the hospital was officially re-opened by the Duke and Duchess of York as a workhouse infirmary with the addition of a large adjacent building in 1900. Originally called Highgate Hill Infirmary, in 1914, it became Islington Infirmary and by 1920, five linked blocks had been added to the south of the original building. The hospital was taken over by the London County Council in 1930 and renamed St Mary's Hospital. At the time of transfer St Mary's Hospital had 621 beds, its medical superintendent was A Remington Hobbs MD MRCP and the steward was JT Bacon. The Matron was Miss MM Travers. Travers was appointed Matron in 1930 and remained in post until her retirement in 1951.

In 1948, St Mary's Hospital (subsequently known as St Mary's Wing) amalgamated with Highgate Hospital (subsequently known as Highgate Wing) and Archway Hospital (subsequently known as Archway Wing) to form the Whittington Hospital. The three hospitals had been brought together under the control of the Archway Group Hospital Management Committee on the establishment of the National Health Service in 1946. The combined facility was named after Sir Richard Whittington, an English merchant, who had left a large sum to charitable causes supporting people in need.

In 1977, a new block containing accident and emergency and outpatient facilities was opened by the North West Metropolitan Regional Hospital Board on the St Mary's Wing site on Highgate Hill. Further expansion took place in 1983, when the City of London Maternity Hospital was closed and amalgamated with the Obstetric Unit to form the City of London Maternity Unit. The Great Northern Building, containing modern wards and education facilities, was completed in 1992.

In 1998, the Archway Wing was sold to University College London and Middlesex University allowing them to form the Archway campus and, in 2004, the Highgate Wing was chosen by Camden and Islington Community NHS Trust as the site for Highgate Mental Health Centre.

With all clinical activities consolidated on the central St Mary's Wing site, a new clinical block and main entrance on Magdala Avenue were procured under the private finance initiative contract. The works, which were undertaken by Jarvis Construction at a cost of £30 million, were completed in 2006.

== Performance ==
Following an inspection in December 2015 of the Trust and its services, Whittington Health was rated as Good by the Care Quality Commission in July 2016 – with caring rated as Outstanding. The Trust has a current deficit of £5.9m for the year ending 2016/17 – £200k worse than its planned position.

== Legacy ==
A statue commissioned by the Nubian Jak Community Trust, in collaboration with the Whittington Health NHS Trust and Haringey Council, to honour the contributions of Windrush and Commonwealth NHS nurses and midwives, was unveiled outside the hospital in September 2021, in association with the launch of an anthology compiled by Jak Beula, entitled Nursing a Nation.

== Notable staff ==
- Edith Cavell (1865 – 1915), British nurse celebrated for treating soldiers from both sides during the First World War and assisting 200 Allied soldiers escape from German-occupied Belgium, for which she was tried and executed. Night superintendent in 1901 at Highgate Hospital, which became the Whittington Hospital.
- Trevor Clay CBE (1936–1994), General Secretary of the Royal College of Nursing from 1982 to 1989, Matron Whittington Hospital, from 1969 to 1970.

== See also ==
- Royal Northern Hospital
- Healthcare in London
- List of hospitals in England
