= Anna Scher =

British drama teacher

Anna Valerie Scher (26 December 1944 – 12 November 2023) was an Irish-born British teacher known for her contributions to drama education.

== Early life and education ==
Born in Cork, Ireland, she was the eldest of four daughters of Eric, a dentist of Lithuanian-Jewish descent, and Claire (née Hurwitz). Scher was educated at St Angela's Convent in Cork, where she was the only Jewish student and developed an early interest in tap-dancing and stage performance. Her early years were influenced by her involvement in the Cork Opera House until its destruction by fire in 1955.

In 1959, the Scher family relocated to Hove, East Sussex, a move initiated by her father's desire to integrate into a larger Jewish community. This transition presented Scher with new cultural and academic challenges, particularly at Hove Grammar School. Her education continued at Hove Grammar School and Brighton School of Music and Art. The period was further marked by familial conflict over Scher's career aspirations, culminating in her mother's departure from the family.

== Career ==
Scher's career in education began after attending Trent Park College of Education. She started as a teacher at Ecclesbourne Junior School in Islington, where she introduced drama classes. These classes grew in popularity and included future actors Pauline Quirke and Linda Robson among their attendees. Confronted with a choice between her teaching role and her drama classes, Scher opted to leave the school and dedicate herself to drama education.

Scher established the Anna Scher Theatre in 1975. The theatre was distinctive for its lack of auditions and lengthy waiting list, which at one point reached 5,000 names. In 2000, Scher experienced severe depression and stepped back from her role at the theatre. When she attempted to return in 2002, she was prevented from doing so by the board of trustees, who had appointed a new principal. She then taught drama classes in a church hall.

Scher was awarded the Freedom of the Borough of Islington in 2003. She was appointed a Member of the Order of the British Empire (MBE) in 2013.

== Personal life ==
Scher married Charles Verrall in 1976. Verrall died in 2023, one month before Scher. They had a son.
