= Arthur Vineberg =

Canadian cardiac surgeon (1903–1988)

- Born: May 24, 1903; Montreal, Quebec, Canada
- Died: March 26, 1988 (aged 84)
- Education: McGill University
- Scientific career
- Fields: Cardiac surgery

Arthur Martin Vineberg, OC (May 24, 1903 – March 26, 1988) was a Canadian cardiac surgeon, university lecturer and author. He was famous for his experimental and clinical studies in revascularization of the heart.

Born in Montreal, Quebec, he received a degree in biochemistry and experimental physiology at McGill University. He was a heart surgeon at Montreal's Royal Victoria Hospital and a lecturer in the Faculty of Medicine of McGill University. His archive is held at the Osler Library at McGill University.

He is known for having developed a surgical procedure called the "Vineberg Procedure" which involved implanting the left mammary artery into the left ventricle of the heart. He first did this procedure in 1946 on an experimental basis and at the Royal Victoria Hospital in 1950.

He published two books, How to Live with your Heart; the Family Guide to Heart Health (1975) and Myocardial Revascularization by Arterial/Ventricular Implants (1982). He was working on his third book, The Complete Guide to Heart Health, before his death.

In 1986, he was made an officer of the Order of Canada (OC), Canada's highest civilian honour.
