= Nubian Jak =

Board game

Nubian Jak Board game
- Players: 2–24
- Setup time: 3 minutes
- Playing time: Unlimited
- Chance: Medium (dice rolling)
- Age range: 11+
- Skills: Black History, General knowledge, Fashion, Pop culture

Nubian Jak is a board game, introduced in 1994, that combines questions on historical facts with pop trivia, to highlight some of the achievements by people of colour globally.

The game requires players to use strategy and skill, with a bit of luck to "Out Jak" and "Chill Out" opponents, while trying to get their own pieces to separate Home Zone areas on the board. Movement is determined by rolling a dice and answering multiple-choice questions when required to do so.

== History ==
Nubian Jak was created in 1994 by Jak Beula, a singer-songwriter and social worker with Islington Council. After working with some young people who seemed disaffected and marginalized by society, he decided to produce an "uplifting" board game that would look at positive role models of African heritage in Britain and Europe. He tried patenting the name "Union Black" but his application was denied due to there already being a game in existence that used the word "Union". Instead he combined the similar sounding words "Nubian" (meaning black) and "Jack" ("lift up" or "flag") to come up with the brand name "Nubian Jack". The use of the letter "C" in the word Jak was subsequently dropped.

On 16 November 1994, 1000 promotional copies of Nubian Jak European African-Centred Edition arrived at a small office in Clapham Junction, south London. A couple of weeks later the game was introduced to selected outlets in the capital, including Hamleys of London and Morleys Stores. This coincided with a Christmas marketing campaign by the radio station Choice FM London and The Voice. Within a few weeks the game was out of stock, outselling Trivial Pursuit and Monopoly combined, in Morleys of Brixton, Selbys of Holloway Road, and Smiths Bros in Tooting, all part of the Morleys Stores chain in London. A re-run was hastily produced and the game was officially launched at Kensington Olympia in January 1995 at the British Toy and Hobby Fair. It became one of the main focus for the British Toy and Hobby Fair that year, and was voted one of the top 10 games for 1995 by Games and Puzzles Magazine.

The BBC also featured the game in a mini-documentary in 1995 called The 11th Hour. The game is often described as "the black Trivial Pursuit".

== Release ==
In February 1996, a World Revised Edition of the game was launched at the Jacob K. Javits Convention Center in New York, at the NY International Toy Fair.

This edition was different from the original as it introduced people of colour from around the world. Its success was followed by a Nu Millennium Edition launched at the beginning of the year 2000 both in London and New York City.

This edition to date is the most successful in the game series, selling more than 110,000 units. In 2006 an International Anniversary Edition was launched to commemorate 10 years of selling the game on both sides of the Atlantic.

This was followed the release of a Special Windrush Edition in December 2008. In February 2009, a Special United States Limited Edition was produced to commemorate the election of the US president Barack Obama.

In 2016, a phone app of the game was launched.

=== Rules and instructions ===
The Nubian Jak board game can be played individually (2–8 players) or in teams (6–24 players). The game consists of a 51 cm 1/4 folding board, four sets of 55 cards, 24 Pyramids (Jaks), a six-sided dice, and a rules booklet.

There are four areas on the board:

1. Jak Zone – Where players start and finish
2. Safety Zone – The first square (or last in new topic zones) Zone – the 12 squares connected to the Jak Zones
3. Octo – Zone – The squares in the centre of the board
4. Zone area – This stops opponents from entering into that topic.

Playing Nubian Jak involves skilful manoeuvring of the pyramid Jaks around the board while answering a series of multiple-choice questions. The first to place three Jaks of the same colour in three separate new Jak Zones is the winner. The card question topics are as follows:

- Millennium Dawn and Literature & Art
- Sport and Politics & Law
- Entertainment and General Knowledge
- Science & Engineering and History

=== Quotes ===
- "A very innovative concept"...Time Life
- "A World First"... Inspired Magazine
- "The Black Trivial Pursuit"...The Voice
- "Highly recommended for everyone"...B.E.T.
- "Global black history with the kind of fun pop trivia even the shallowest of us can answer."...Sky Magazine

== Book of World Facts ==
In follow up to the board game, in 1998 the first edition of Nubian Jak's Book of World Facts was released. Dubbed "the truth with proof", it was subtitled "The Ultimate Reference Guide to Global Black Achievement". A few years later Jak signed a publishing deal with HarperCollins in New York to republish the book.

By the time the third edition of the game came around there was an expectant buzz within the game industry. Launched in 2000, the Nu Millennium edition of the game went on to become the most popular edition to date, selling in excess of 110,000 copies in the US and UK. In 2006 the International Anniversary Edition was distributed in the UK before it official launch at the ExCel Centre in London and Javits Center in New York, in January and February 2007 respectively. At a Special Kwanzaa Bonanza Game and Book launch in December 2008, the Windrush Edition was introduced. A United States Special edition has subsequently been produced for selective distribution in the US.

== See also ==
- Nubian Jak Community Trust
