= No. 3 Canadian General Hospital (McGill) =

Canadian medical unit in WWI

The No. 3 Canadian General Hospital (McGill) was a Canadian medical unit which formed part of the Canadian Army Medical Corps during the First World War. It was in existence between 1915 and 1920. The hospital was staffed by professors and students from McGill University.

During the First World War, the first Canadian dentists to serve overseas were deployed with No. 3 Canadian General Hospital (McGill).

Its most famous member, and its commanding officer for much of its existence, was Lieutenant-Colonel John McCrae, the author of In Flanders Fields. Other staff included Francis Alexander Caron Scrimger, VC, Edward William Archibald, and Edward Revere Osler, the only son of Sir William Osler.

== See also ==
- Clare Gass
