= Royal Victoria Hospital, Montreal =

Royal Victoria Hospital - Glen
- McGill University Health Centre
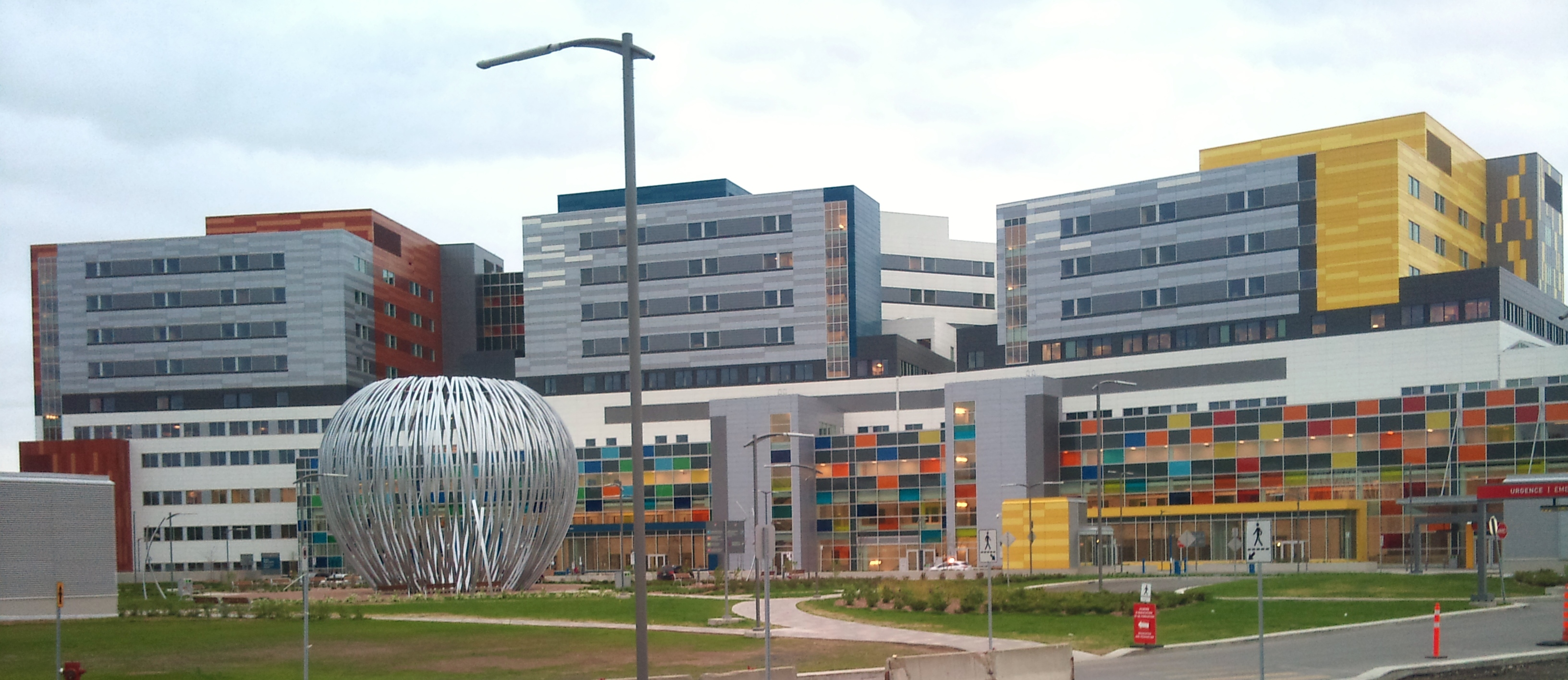
- McGill University Health Center's hospital complex - Glen site

- Location in Montreal (Glen site)

Geography
- Location: 1001 Decarie Boulevard, Montreal, Quebec, Canada
- Coordinates: 45.471851°N 73.602716°W

Organization
- Care system: Public (RAMQ)
- Type: Teaching
- Affiliated university: McGill University Faculty of Medicine
- Network: McGill University Health Centre

Services
- Emergency department: Yes
- Beds: 517
- Speciality: General medicine, Surgery, Organ Transplantation

History
- Founded: 1893 (Legacy site); 2015 (Glen site)

Links
- Website: muhc.ca/glen-site
- Lists: Hospitals in Canada

The Royal Victoria Hospital (RVH) (French: Hôpital Royal Victoria (HRV)), colloquially known as the "Royal Vic" or "The Vic", is a hospital in Montreal, Quebec, Canada. It is part of the McGill University Health Centre (MUHC).

The hospital was established in 1893 and was based at Pine Avenue, now known as the Legacy site. In 2015, the RVH's major hospital operations were moved to the Glen site at 1001 Décarie Boulevard.

== History ==
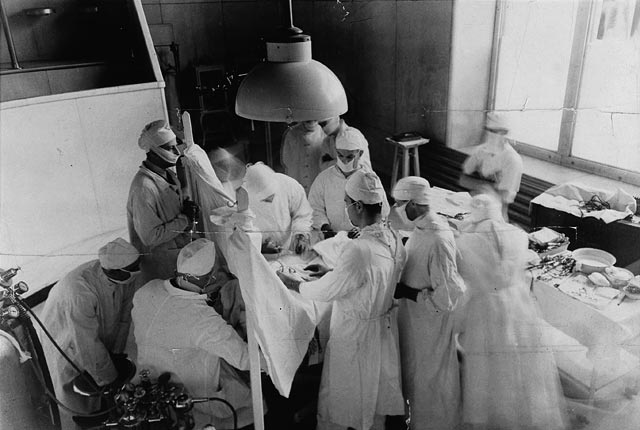
Surgeons Norman Bethune, Arthur Vineberg and Perron assisting Edward William Archibald in an operation, 1933

The Royal Victoria Hospital was established in 1893 in the historic Golden Square Mile through donations by two public-spirited Scottish immigrants, the cousins Donald Smith, 1st Lord Strathcona, and George Stephen, 1st Lord Mount Stephen. In 1887, they announced a joint gift of C$1,000,000 for the construction of a free hospital in Montreal and purchased a site on Mount Royal for a further C$86,000. The site they bought was the old Frothingham estate that covered ten acres of land. During 1897 and 1898, Smith and Stephen gave another C$1,000,000 between them in Great Northern Railroad securities to establish an endowment fund to maintain the hospital. Stephen and Smith attached one caveat to their generous contribution to the City of Montreal: the hospital's land and its buildings must only ever be used for healing.

The founders intended the Royal Vic "to be for the use of the sick and ailing without distinction of race or creed," and when it opened in 1893 it was hailed as the "finest and most perfectly equipped (hospital) on the great American continent". The hospital originally had 150 employees, including 14 medical doctors.

Over the years, the philanthropy and business acumen of many of the residents of the Golden Square Mile - the prominent members of Montreal's English speaking community - brought the hospital global recognition as a major centre of healthcare and learning. Major contributors included James Ross, Richard Angus, Sir Vincent Meredith and Sir Montagu Allan.

In 1920, the hospital became a medical research institute through the McGill University Faculty of Medicine. Among the list of medical achievements at the Royal Victoria was the first successful kidney transplant in the Commonwealth in 1958. It was achieved by a team led by nephrologist John Dossetor and surgeons Joe Luke and Ken MacKinnon. Since the merger in 1997, the Royal Victoria Hospital is part of the McGill University Health Centre.

During the 2020 coronavirus pandemic, the hospital was being used as an isolation unit for homeless people who were infected with coronavirus disease 2019 (COVID-19), as well as those awaiting test results.

== Legacy site ==
Royal Victoria Hospital - Legacy
- Hôpital Royal Victoria - Legacy
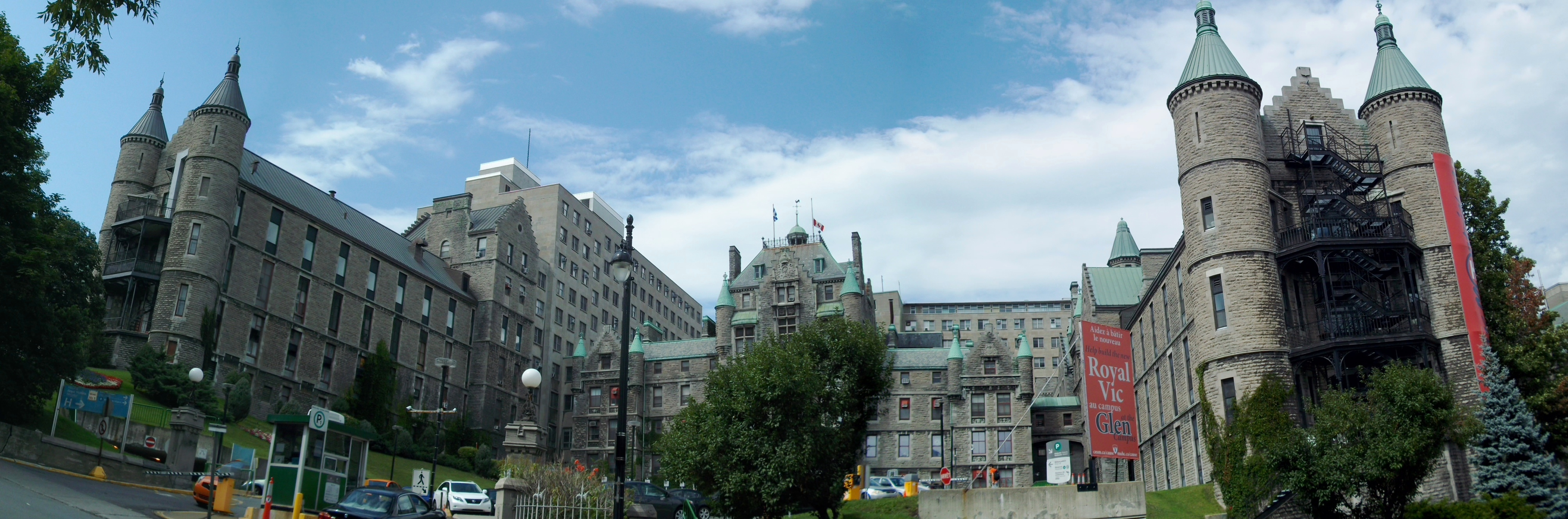
- Original site of the Royal Victoria Hospital, now a historic site part of McGill University

- Location in Montreal

General information
- Type: hospital
- Architectural style: Scottish baronial
- Location: 687 Pine Avenue, Montreal, Canada
- Coordinates: 45.50826°N 73.58145°W
- Completed: 1893
- Relocated: 2015

Technical details
- Material: Montreal limestone

Design and construction
- Architect: Saxon Snell

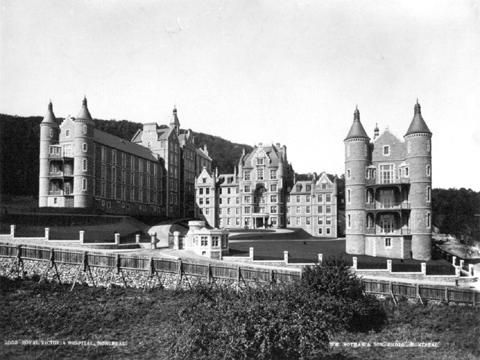
The Royal Victoria Hospital, 1893

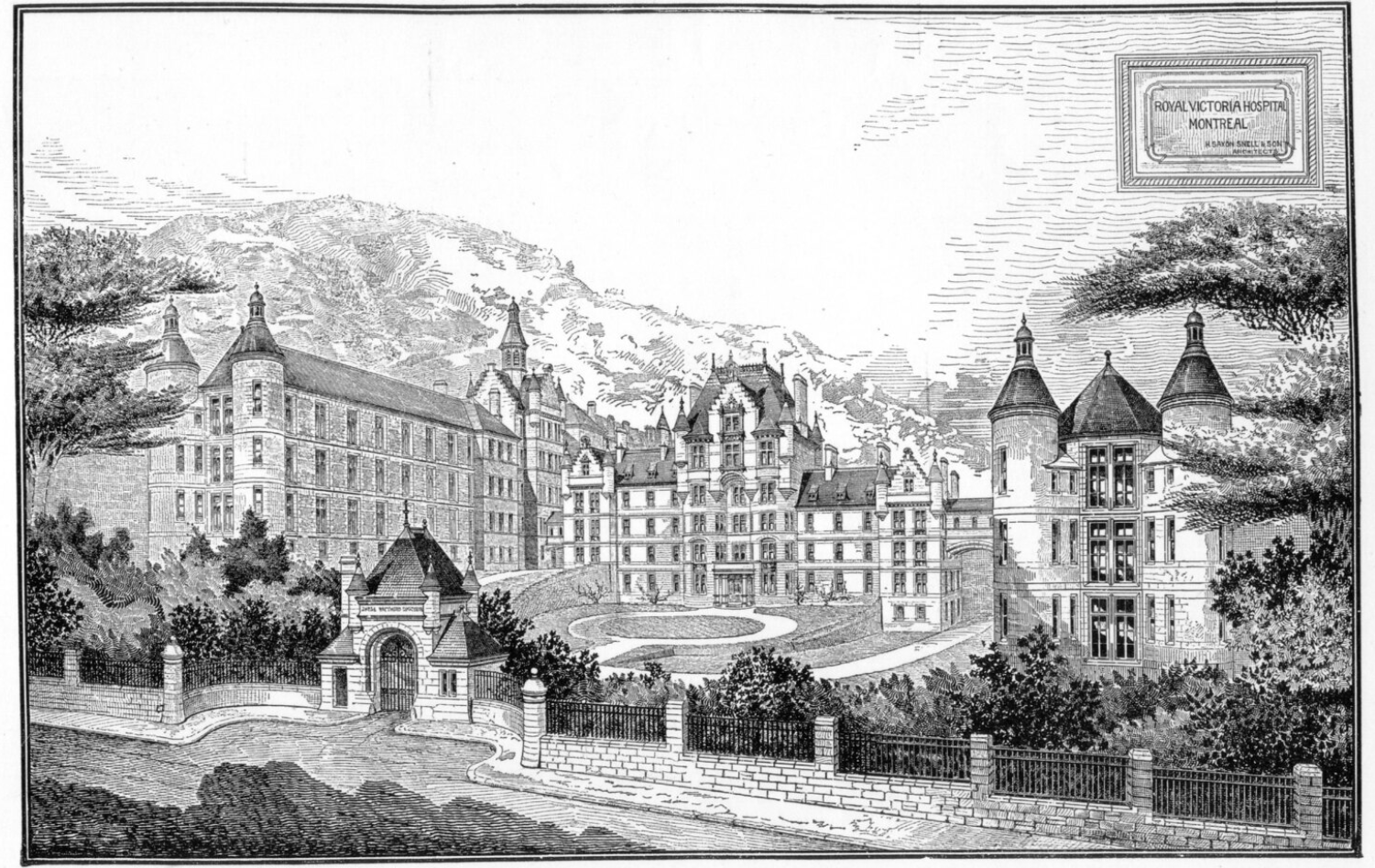
Royal Victoria Hospital, Mcgill, 1890

The hospital was previously housed in a building complex at 687 Pine Avenue on the slope of Mount Royal in the borough of Ville-Marie. Most of the hospital's operations moved to the new Glen site of the McGill University Health Centre on April 26, 2015. The McGill Reproductive Centre and the Dialysis Clinic remained at the original site for a time, but eventually were relocated.

Of the Legacy Site's nine pavilions, three date from the original 1893 hospital and were designed by Henry Saxon Snell in the Scottish baronial style. The nearby Allan Memorial Institute continues to house the psychiatry department. The post-2015 future of the 122-year-old Royal Vic building is yet to be determined. McGill University has unveiled an idea to repurpose the hospital for academic purposes, but also add community and green space, a project that opposes the wishes of the founders, lords Strathcona and Stephen.

The original hospital was designed by the Scottish architect Henry Saxon Snell, who from the 1860s had made a name for himself in England and Scotland as a leading specialist in the design of hospitals, particularly in London. Constructed of Montreal limestone, the original Royal Vic is distinguished by its crenelated structures and romantic turrets framing generous sun porches at the corners of its imposing medical and surgical wards. Snell's aesthetic plans for the Royal Vic were inspired by the Scottish baronial style of the Royal Infirmary of Edinburgh. From a medical perspective, his design of the Royal Vic was influenced by the ideas of Florence Nightingale as a Pavilion Hospital, in which the separation and isolation of both patients and diseases were thought to discourage the spread of infection. The original part of the building was completed in 1893.

The hospital was later enlarged by the addition of new wings of the same architectural style. The H pavilion opened in 1905 as the nurses' residence. The 1920s saw the addition of the Women's and Ross Memorial pavilions. Another expansion was completed in the early 1950s giving the hospital its M and S pavilions; a portion of the original hospital was demolished to accomplish this. Lastly, the C pavilion, housing the emergency room, birthing centre, and a large modern ICU opened in 1993. A time capsule is located in the wall facing the C pavilion's elevators on the ground floor.

=== Hersey Pavilion ===
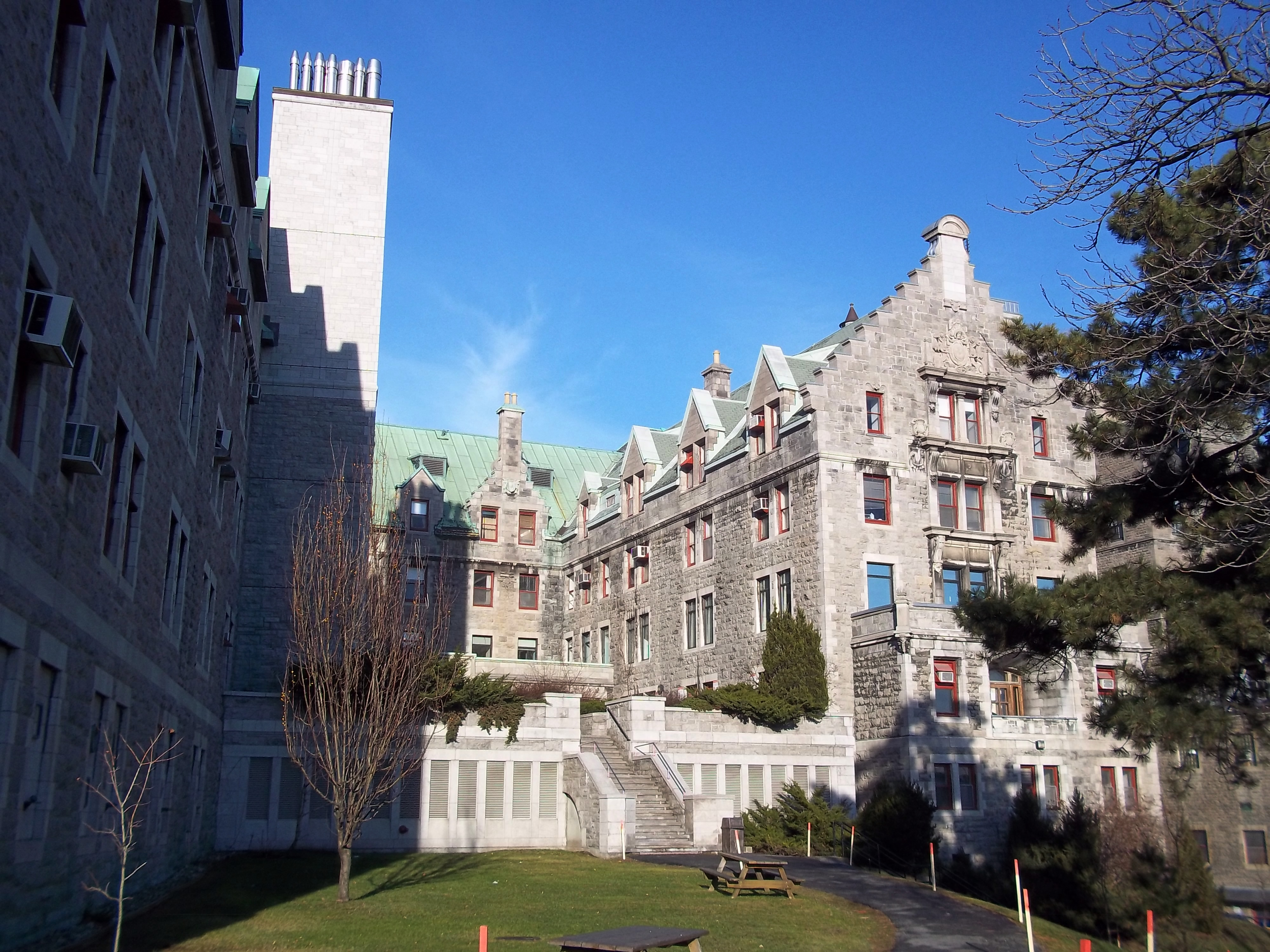
The Hersey Pavilion was designed by Edward & William Sutherland Maxwell, 1905. It was designated a National Historic Site in 1997

The Hersey Pavilion, also known as the H Pavilion, was one of the first purpose-built nurses' residences in Canada. It was constructed in 1907 and designed by the well-known Montreal architects Edward & William Sutherland Maxwell. It was designated a National Historic Site in 1997 in recognition of the important role the building played in the training and professionalism of nurses in Canada.

=== Pool ===
The hospital had an outdoor pool and patio located between the Hersey pavilion and Allan Memorial Institute. In 2014, the pool closed until further notice.

== Notable surgeons ==
- Sir Thomas Roddick, first Surgeon-in-Chief of the Royal Vic
- Edward William Archibald, dubbed Canada's first neurosurgeon; President of the American Surgical Association
- Lt.-Colonel John McCrae, Royal Vic physician who wrote In Flanders Fields
- Norman Bethune, developed a mobile blood-transfusion service during the Spanish Civil War
- Wilder Penfield OM, CC, CMG, FRS, founded the Montreal Neurological Institute; called "the greatest living Canadian" in his day.
- Martin Henry Dawson, the first person in history to inject penicillin into a patient, 1940
- Arthur Vineberg OC, developed the 'Vineberg Procedure' at the Royal Vic in 1950
- Kathryn Stephenson, the first female American plastic surgeon; first female editor of Plastic and Reconstructive Surgery
- John Dossetor OC, co–coordinated the first kidney transplant in both Canada and the Commonwealth, 1958
- Balfour Mount OC, considered the father of palliative care in North America.
- Jonathan Larmonth Meakins OC, Royal Vic Chief Surgeon; 4th person & 1st Canadian Nuffield Professor of Surgery at Oxford, 2002

== Notable nurses ==
- Mabel Clint, war-time nurse who served with the Canadian Expeditionary Force during World War I in France, Belgium, and Greece.
- Helen Kendall, war-time nurse who was awarded the Royal Red Cross

== See also ==
- Montreal Neurological Institute and Hospital (The Neuro)
- Allan Memorial Institute
- Montreal General Hospital
- Royal eponyms in Canada
