= Clare Gass =

Canadian nurse (1887–1968)

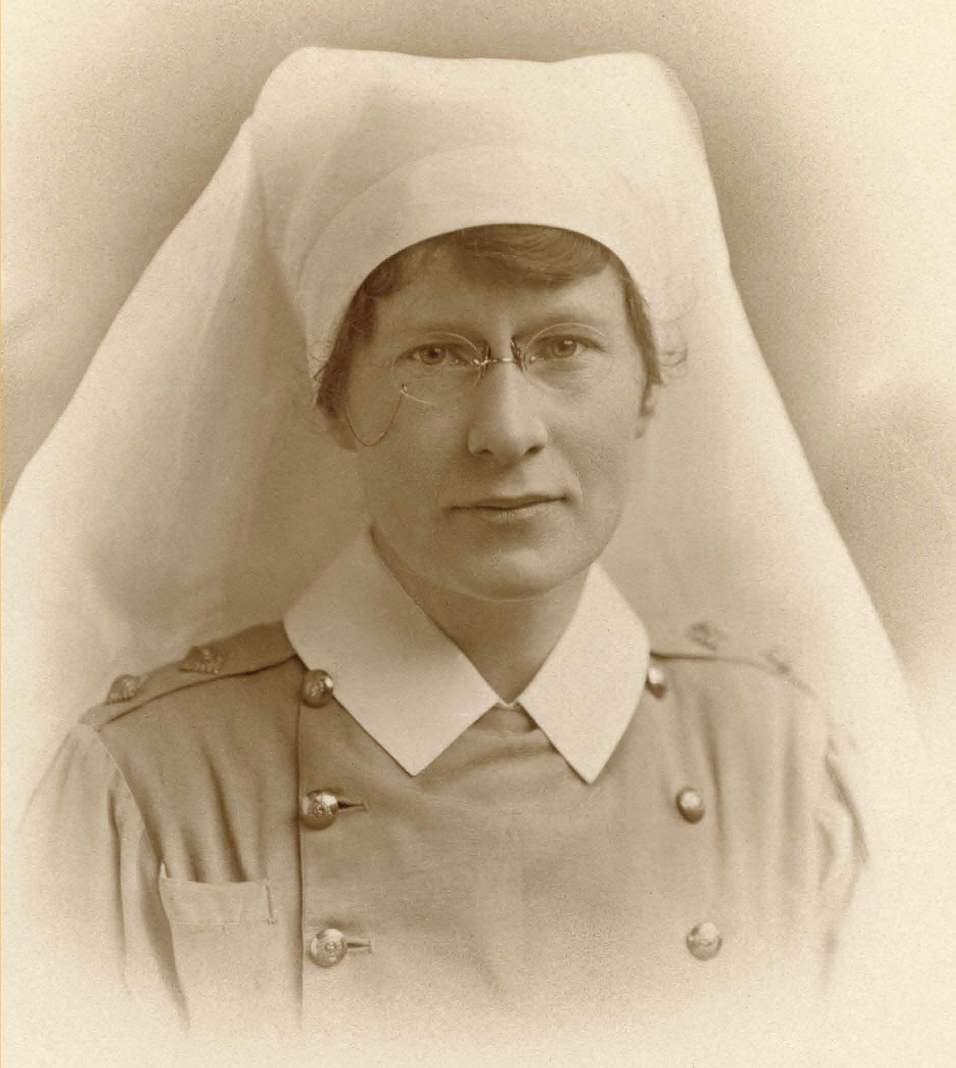
- Born: Lelia Clare Gass; 18 March 1887; Shubenacadie, Nova Scotia, Canada
- Died: 5 August 1968 (aged 81); Halifax, Nova Scotia, Canada
- Occupations: Nurse; social worker
- Military Service
- Allegiance: Canada
- Branch: Canadian Army Medical Corps
- Rank: Lieutenant

Lelia Clare Gass (18 March 1887 – 5 August 1968) was a Canadian nurse and social worker from Nova Scotia who served as a nursing sister with the Canadian Army Medical Corps in the First World War. After the war, Gass contributed to the development of medical social work in Canada. Her diaries, one of which recorded John McCrae's poem In Flanders Fields six weeks before its first publication, are a valuable historical resource providing insight into hospital life during the war.

== Early life ==
Clare Gass was born on 18 March 1887 in Shubenacadie, Nova Scotia, as the eldest child and only daughter of Robert Gass and Nerissa Miller. Her father was a prosperous general store and lumber mill owner, and her mother came from a local brickmaking family. Raised in a spacious home in Shubenacadie, she enjoyed a close relationship with her father, who provided her with four years of private education at the Church School for Girls in Windsor. This education prepared her for nursing training at the Montreal General Hospital from 1909 to 1912.

== Military career ==
In April 1915, Gass joined the Canadian Army Medical Corps (CAMC) as a nursing sister with the No. 3 Canadian General Hospital. She served primarily in France, and helped to set up the initial tented hospital at Camiers in the summer of 1915. Her brother Blanchard Victor and second cousin Laurence Henderson were both killed at Vimy Ridge in April 1917.

Gass was posted to the No. 2 Canadian Casualty Clearing Station at Remy Siding in Flanders, Belgium in November 1917. Now closer to the front lines, she spent seven months working at the station on day and night duty in multiple wards. As a member of the military and relative of soldiers, Gass was allowed to vote in the 1917 Canadian federal election while working at Remy Siding. She voted for the Unionist government.

During the German spring offensive in 1918, Gass endured air raids and evacuations. Later that year, she was transferred to lighter nursing duties in England, and then to transport duty. She escorted sick and wounded soldiers back to Canada until she was demobilized in November 1919.

== Post-war career ==
After the war, Gass studied social service at McGill University from 1920 to 1921 and worked as a social worker and secretary for the Family Welfare Association of Montreal. In 1924, she became the director of the social service department at the Western Division of the Montreal General Hospital, a position she held for 28 years. In this capacity, Gass contributed to the development of professional medical social work in Canada, collaborating with the American Association of Hospital Social Workers (AAHSW). She served as president of the Eastern Canada District of the association from 1930 to 1931, and again from 1946 to 1947.

Gass retired in 1952, and subsequently spent six months establishing the social service department at the Canadian National Institute for the Blind before returning home to Shubenacadie.

== Later life and death ==
In retirement, Gass remained active in her community of Shubenacadie, engaging in a variety of projects in the areas of history, drama, photography, poetry, and music. She spent summers at a cabin on Martinique Beach, where she hosted relatives and colleagues from Montreal. Gass was among the charter members of the East Hants Historical Society, established in 1967.

Gass died on 5 August 1968 at Camp Hill Hospital in Halifax, at the age of 81. She never married.

== Diary ==
Against military rules at the time, Gass kept three detailed diaries throughout the war which now serve as a valuable historical resource. The diaries were edited by Susan Mann and published as The War Diary of Clare Gass, 1915–1918 by McGill–Queen's University Press in 2000.

Gass' diary notably included John McCrae's poem In Flanders Fields, recorded six weeks before its first publication. After McCrae wrote the poem, he shared it with Gass to ask for her feedback. She encouraged him to send the poem to Punch, and copied it into her diary.

== See also ==
- Canada in World War I
- Canadian women in the world wars
- Helen Kendall – military nurse from Nova Scotia who served in WWI and WWII
