= Henry Saxon Snell =

British architect and designer of public buildings in London (1831–1904)

Henry Saxon Snell (1831–1904)

Henry Saxon Snell (4 April 1831 – 10 January 1904) was a noted architect who specialised in health facilities and designed many London hospitals and other public buildings. He was the author of two significant architectural books: Hospital Construction and Management (1883) and Charitable and Parochial Establishments (1880).

Educated at University College London. He was admitted a fellow of the Royal Institute of British Architects on 20 February 1871. One of his proposers, David Brandon, was a specialist in London hospitals. He worked as an assistant to James Pennethorne, Joseph Paxton and William Tite, and from 1860 to 1864 was the chief draughtsman to Francis Fowke.

He made his name in the later 1860s with innovative designs for workhouses and quickly extended his practice to hospitals and infirmaries in which he became one of the leading specialists in the 1890s and early 1900s, his main clients being the London guardians.

In 1886, he designed the Montrose Asylum
In 1887, he designed the Holborn Union Infirmary
In 1887, he designed the Aberdeen Royal Infirmary
In 1889, he designed the Leanchoil Hospital
In 1893, he designed the Royal Victoria Hospital, Montreal.

His design of the Royal Victoria Hospital, Montreal, was influenced by the ideas of Florence Nightingale as a 'pavilion hospital' in which the separation and isolation of both patients and diseases were thought to discourage the spread of infection. Constructed of Montreal limestone, the hospital was also distinguished by romantic turrets framing generous sun porches at the corners of its imposing medical and surgical wards. Snell modelled it on the Royal Infirmary of Edinburgh.

His father, George Blagrave Snell was a shorthand writer of some note, whilst a number of his descendants were also architects, notably Alfred Walter Saxon Snell and Harry Saxon Snell (who designed Melbourne Cathedral, Australia).
