= Nubian Jak Community Trust =

UK commemorative plaque and sculpture scheme celebrating diverse history

Nubian Jak Community Trust (NJCT) is a commemorative plaque and sculpture scheme founded by Jak Beula that highlights the historic contributions of Black and minority ethnic people in Britain. The first NJCT heritage plaque, honouring Bob Marley, was unveiled in 2006 after "two years of research and behind the scenes negotiating". The scheme has been run and managed by the not-for-profit organization Nubian Jak Trust Ltd since August 2016, with a remit to commemorate and celebrate the diverse history of modern Britain. Its objectives include the promotion of social equality and to encourage activities that promote cultural diversity in society.

== Overview ==
The Trust was founded by Jak Beula and works in partnership with educational groups, cultural institutions, local government, and public- and private-sector organizations. Its activities include exhibitions, seminars, workshops, and learning programmes, as well as managing a national plaque and sculpture scheme.

The scheme, which is the only one of its kind in Europe, highlights BME presence in Britain by commemorating individuals who have made a recognisable contribution to the nation. These individuals (mostly deceased) are either nominated by members of the public, or recommended by a special panel within the Trust, to receive a commemorative plaque. One of the most famous plaques of recent years is the Bob Marley Blue Plaque, which the Nubian Jak Community Trust arranged in partnership with the Mayor of London in October 2006. It was the first commemorative event organised by the Nubian Jak Community Trust, as well as also being County Hall's first ever blue plaque. The installation of the Bob Marley plaque was filmed as a feature for a 90-minute Arena documentary aired on BBC1 the following October called Bob Marley: Exodus 77.

The next three Nubian Jak Community Trust plaques were installed as part of the bicentenary commemoration for the British abolition of the Slave Trade Act 1807.

The first of the plaques installed in 2007 had a public ceremony unveiling inside Luton Town Hall in February 2007. The Luton Bicentenary Plaque is now installed outside Luton Central Library in Central Square.

This was followed by the historic plaque to Ignatius Sancho erected in October 2007 at the Foreign and Commonwealth Office in the City of Westminster, near which site Sancho lived and had a grocery store. It is the only black plaque in Whitehall. A couple of weeks later, on 26 October, another NJCT bronze plaque was installed on Senate House, part of the University of London, to Bermuda-born abolitionist and author Mary Prince.

On 24 August 2018, Nubian Jak unveiled the world's largest blue plaque, honouring the pioneers of the Notting Hill Carnival. In 2026, the plaque was relocated to Westbourne Park station.

By 2019, the Nubian Jak Community Trust Plaque Scheme had installed 50 commemorative plaques around the UK.

In November 2020, the "Black Plaque Project", a joint campaign by Havas London and Nubian Jak Community Trust to honour Black Londoners, was launched to address the lack of diversity in the capital's "blue plaques". Nubian Jak blue plaques will subsequently replace the black plaques.

On 1 April 2021, a blue plaque was installed at 16-18 Trinity Gardens, Brixton, where Choice FM, the UK's only black radio station to have held a London-wide commercial licence, was launched, co-founded by Neil Kenlock and Yvonne Thompson.

== Nubian Jak Community Trust plaques 2006–present ==
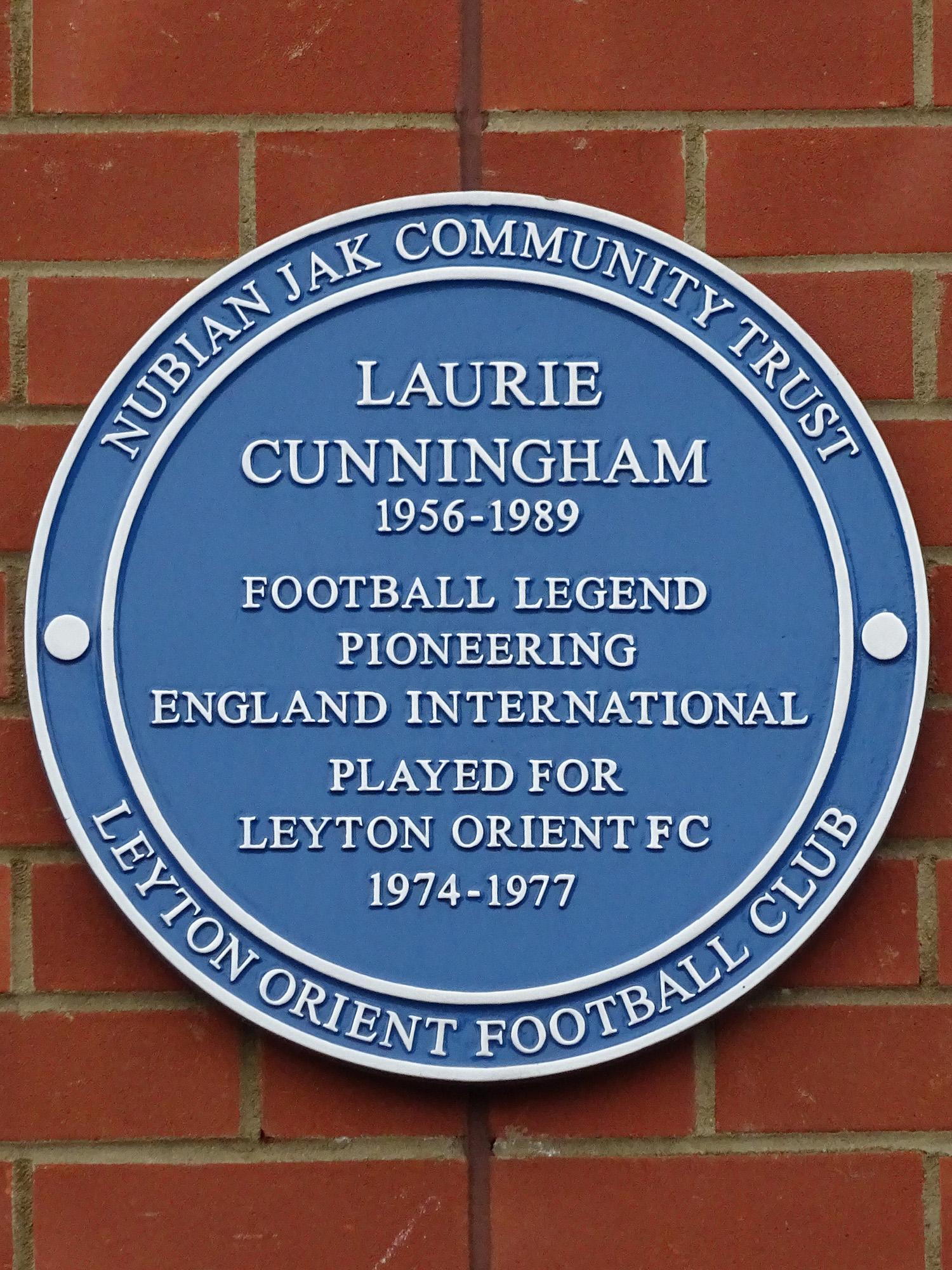
Blue plaque for Laurie Cunningham, outside Brisbane Road

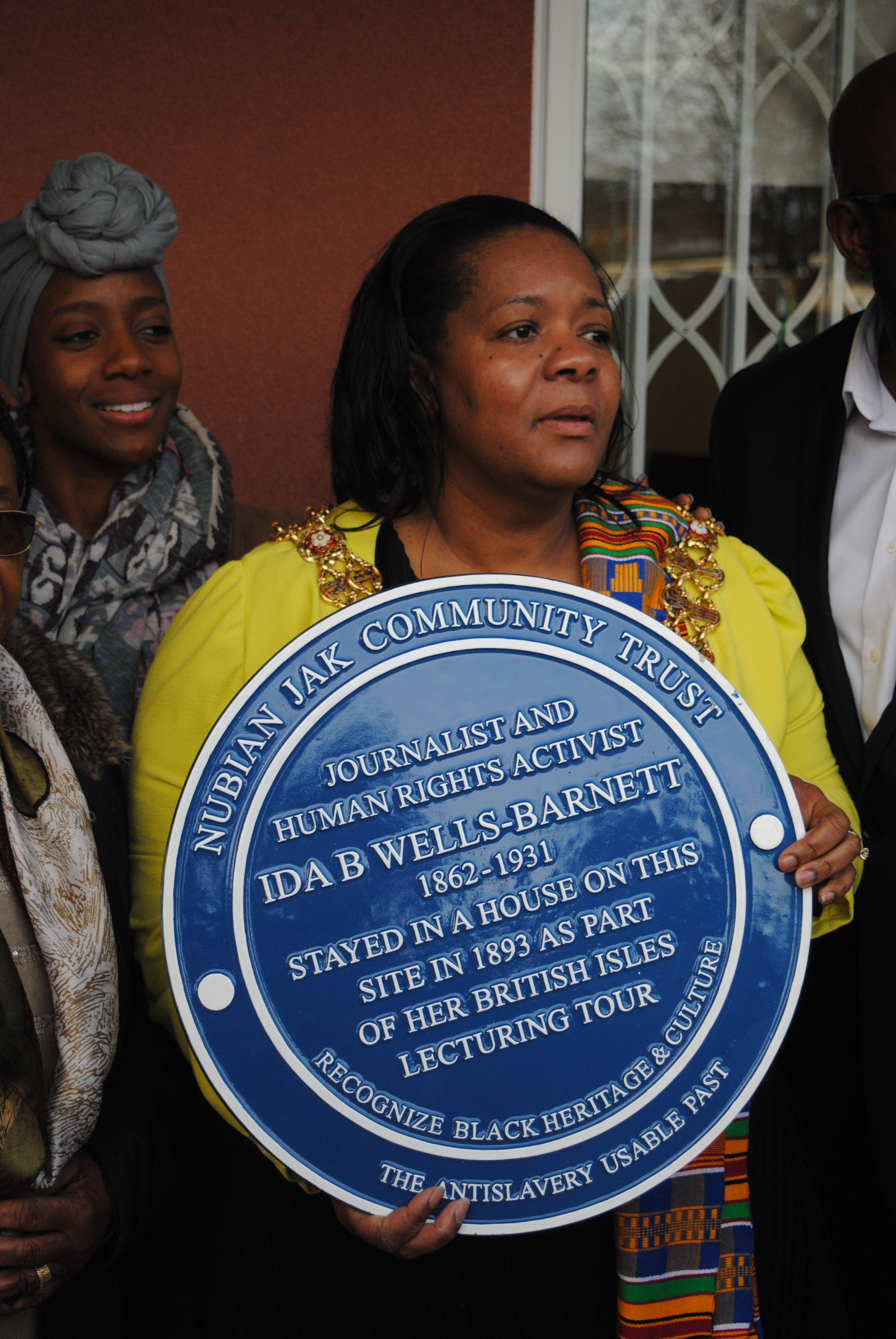
Lord Mayor of Birmingham, Yvonne Mosquito, with the Edgbaston blue plaque

- The Honourable Bob Marley plaque: October 2006
- Luton Bicentenary plaque: February 2007
- Ignatius Sancho plaque (Stone): October 2007
- Mary Prince plaque (Bronze): October 2007
- Connie Mark plaque: May 2008
- Claudia Jones plaque x 2 (Bronze and Blue): August 2008
- Kelso Cochrane plaque: May 2009
- Chief Amy Ashwood Garvey plaque: November 2009
- ANC/Nelson Mandela anniversary plaque: February 2010
- Learie, Lord Constantine plaque: September 2010
- Rudy Narayan plaque: November 2010
- Mayor John Archer Plaque: December 2010
- New Cross Fire plaque: January 2011
- George Padmore Plaque: June 2011
- Claudia Jones plaque: August 2011
- Rhaune Laslett plaque: August 2011
- Frank Crichlow plaque: December 2011
- Malcolm X plaque: February 2012
- Dennis Brown plaque: April 2012
- Russell Henderson plaque: August 2012
- Leslie Palmer plaque: August 2012
- Arthur Wint plaque: October 2012
- Bernie Grant MP Plaque: October 2012
- Samuel Coleridge Taylor Plaque: December 2012
- Frederick Douglass plaque: February 2013
- Frank Bates plaque: May 2013
- Stephen Lawrence anniversary plaque: June 2013
- Pete Robinson Plaque: July 2013
- Laurie Cunningham plaque: October 2013
- Dr John Alcindor plaque: July 2014
- George Africanus plaque: October 2014
- Walter Tull plaque: October 2014
- Sidney Bechet plaque: November 2014
- British West Indies Regiment Seaford plaques x 2, November 2015 and March 2018
- Cy Grant plaque: November 2017
- Notting Hill Carnival Pioneers plaque: August 2018
- Daphne Steele plaque: 16 October 2018
- Eric Huntley and Jessica Huntley plaque: October 2018
- Ida B. Wells plaque, 12 February 2019
- Harold Moody, League of Coloured Peoples anniversary plaque: 13 March 2019
- Cecile Nobrega plaque, 1 June 2019.
- Plaque commemorating the contribution of African-American soldiers based in Wales in World War II, installed at RAF Carew Cheriton on the 75th anniversary of the D-Day landings, 6 June 2019.
- Phillis Wheatley plaque, 16 July 2019.
- Bob Marley, Peter Tosh, and Bunny Wailer plaque at the former site of Basing Street Studios in London where The Wailers' albums Catch a Fire and Burnin' were completed, as well as the Bob Marley and the Wailers album Exodus, October 2019.
- "In Memory of Septimius Severus 145–211, African Roman Emperor", October 2019.
- Longfield Hall (home of the Dark and Light Theatre) plaque, 27 October 2019.
- Emma Clarke plaque, 2 December 2019.
- Dr George Alfred Busby plaque, 9 March 2020.
- Crystal Palace Bowl, venue where Bob Marley played his last and biggest London concert and debuted "Redemption Song".
- Winifred Atwell, at the site of her former hair salon, Chaucer Road, Brixton, south London, November 2020.
- Len Dyke, Dudley Dryden and Tony Wade, proprietors of the pioneering Dyke & Dryden Black haircare business, at the site of a wig and cosmetic shop they ran in Tottenham, November 2020.
- Errol Brown, Black plaque outside the RAK Studios in St John's Wood, November 2020.
- Choice FM, blue plaque, Trinity Gardens, Brixton, 1 April 2021.
- William Cuffay and his father Chatham Cuffay, plaque at Chatham Historic Dockyard, 15 July 2021.
- Fela Kuti, at 12 Stanlake Rd, Shepherds bush, London, 1 Nov 2021
- Darcus Howe, Railton Road, Brixton, 4 January 2022.
- Michael Ibru, at his former Kensington home, 7 April 2023.

=== African and Caribbean War Memorial ===
On Armistice Day 2014, as part of the four-year centenary commemorating World War I, the Nubian Jak Community Trust temporarily displayed Britain's first dedicated African and Caribbean War Memorial to servicemen and women from Africa and the Caribbean, who served alongside Britain and the Allied Forces during World War I and World War II at the Black Cultural Archives in Brixton, before its eventual permanent installation on London's Windrush Square, on 22 June 2017.
