= Cécile Nobrega =

Guyanese-British writer and activist

- Nobrega at the unveiling of the Bronze Woman (2008)
- Born: 1 June 1919; Georgetown, British Guiana
- Died: 19 November 2013 (aged 94); Lambeth, South London, UK
- Occupations: Poet; Composer; Community activist

Cécile Nobrega, née Burgan (1 June 1919 – 19 November 2013) was a Guyanese-born British teacher, poet, playwright, composer and community activist. She led a 15-year campaign to establish a monument in Stockwell Memorial Gardens, Bronze Woman, the first public statue of a black woman to be on permanent display in England.

== Life in Guyana ==
Cécile Burgan was born in Georgetown, Guyana, on 1 June 1919, the daughter of Canon William Granville Burgan and his wife Imelda. On the suggestion of her maternal grandmother, she was named Cécile after Cécile Chaminade, the first French female composer to receive the Legion of Honour. In 1942 she married Romeo Nobrega, with whom she had three children. She graduated from Bishops' High School, Guyana.

After training as a teacher, Cécile Nobrega started two schools in Guyana: a kindergarten and a vocational school for teenage girls. She wrote music and plays, including the play Stabroek Fantasy (1956), which had record runs in Guyana, and the song "Twilight". She was the editor of You magazine for St. Sidwell's Anglican Church, and president of the kindergarten section of the Guyana Teachers' Union. She also represented Guyana at the 1964 International Children's Theatre Conference, held in London.

"Bronze Woman", a poem in her 1968 collection Soliloquies, celebrated the historical role of Caribbean women sacrificing everything to protect their children.

== Life in the United Kingdom ==
In 1969, after losing an employment case against the government at the Privy Council, Nobrega emigrated to the UK. She retrained at Hockerill Teacher Training College to teach drama, and taught in Hertfordshire and the London Borough of Brent. She was active in the National Union of Teachers and in adult literacy. She was also a member of PEN, the International Alliance of Women and the Commonwealth Countries League.

Nobrega moved to Lambeth in 1991. After her husband died in 1994, Nobrega established the Bronze Woman Project. She died on 19 November 2013 at the age of 94.

=== Bronze Woman ===
The Bronze Woman Project was a charitable organization that successfully raised funds for a public monument to womanhood in Britain. Bronze Woman is a ten-foot statue of a mother and child, designed by sculptor Ian Walters, and after his death completed by Aleix Barbat. It was unveiled on a busy traffic junction in Stockwell, south London on 8 October 2008. The Baroness Scotland of Asthal delivered a keynote speech; alongside Nobrega around the statue were artist Anissa Jane, entrepreneur Sonita Alleyne, Rosalind Howells, Baroness Howells of St Davids, community activist Jessica Huntley, MOBO Awards founder Kanya King, diversity expert Brenda King, equal rights campaigner Doreen Lawrence and community campaigner Sybil Phoenix. It is the first public statue of a black woman to be on permanent display in England.

== Works ==
=== Theatre ===
- (with Helen Taitt) Stabroek Fantasy. Musical, 1956.

=== Publications ===
- "Eldorado's golden princess". Stories from Guyana. Georgetown: Guyana Daily Chronicle. 1960s. OCLC 82585844.
- Verse in Donald Trotman, ed. (1968). Voices Of Guyana: an anthology. Georgetown?: International P.E.N. OCLC 4192260.
- Soliloquies (in Verse). 1968.
- Japan, the Butterfly. Hansib Publishing, 1991. ISBN 1-870518-26-8
