= Whittington Health NHS Trust =

Healthcare trust in London, England

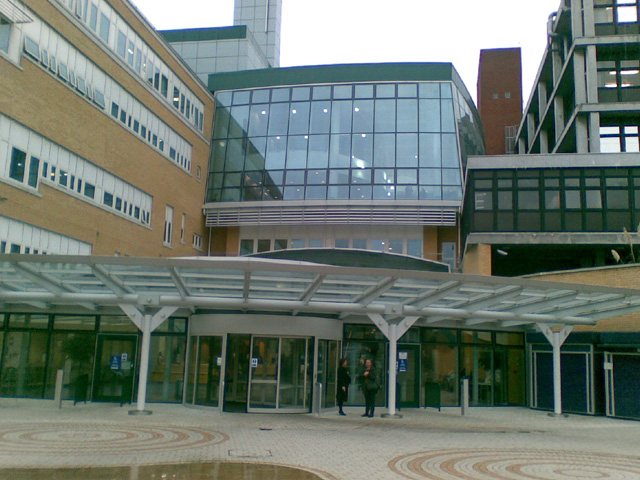
- Whittington Hospital
- Type: NHS trust
- Established: 4 November 1992
- Headquarters: Magdala Avenue; London; N19 5NF
- Hospitals: Whittington Hospital
- Staff: 4,480 (2019/20)
- Website: www.whittington.nhs.uk

Whittington Health NHS Trust is an NHS trust in London, England, that manages the Whittington Hospital. It primarily serves the London boroughs of Islington and Haringey, but also provides some services to the London boroughs of Barnet, Camden, Enfield and Hackney. It runs the Michael Palin Centre for Stammering Children.

== History ==
The trust was established as Whittington Hospital NHS Trust on 4 November 1992, and became operational on 1 April 1993. It took its current name on 6 November 2017.

In 2021, the Trust was awarded the Freedom of the Borough of Islington, in recognition of their "contribution [...] to life in the borough" and notably to efforts to keep the community safe during the COVID-19 crisis.

== See also ==
- Healthcare in London
- List of NHS trusts
