= Len Garrison =

British community activist and historian (1943–2003)

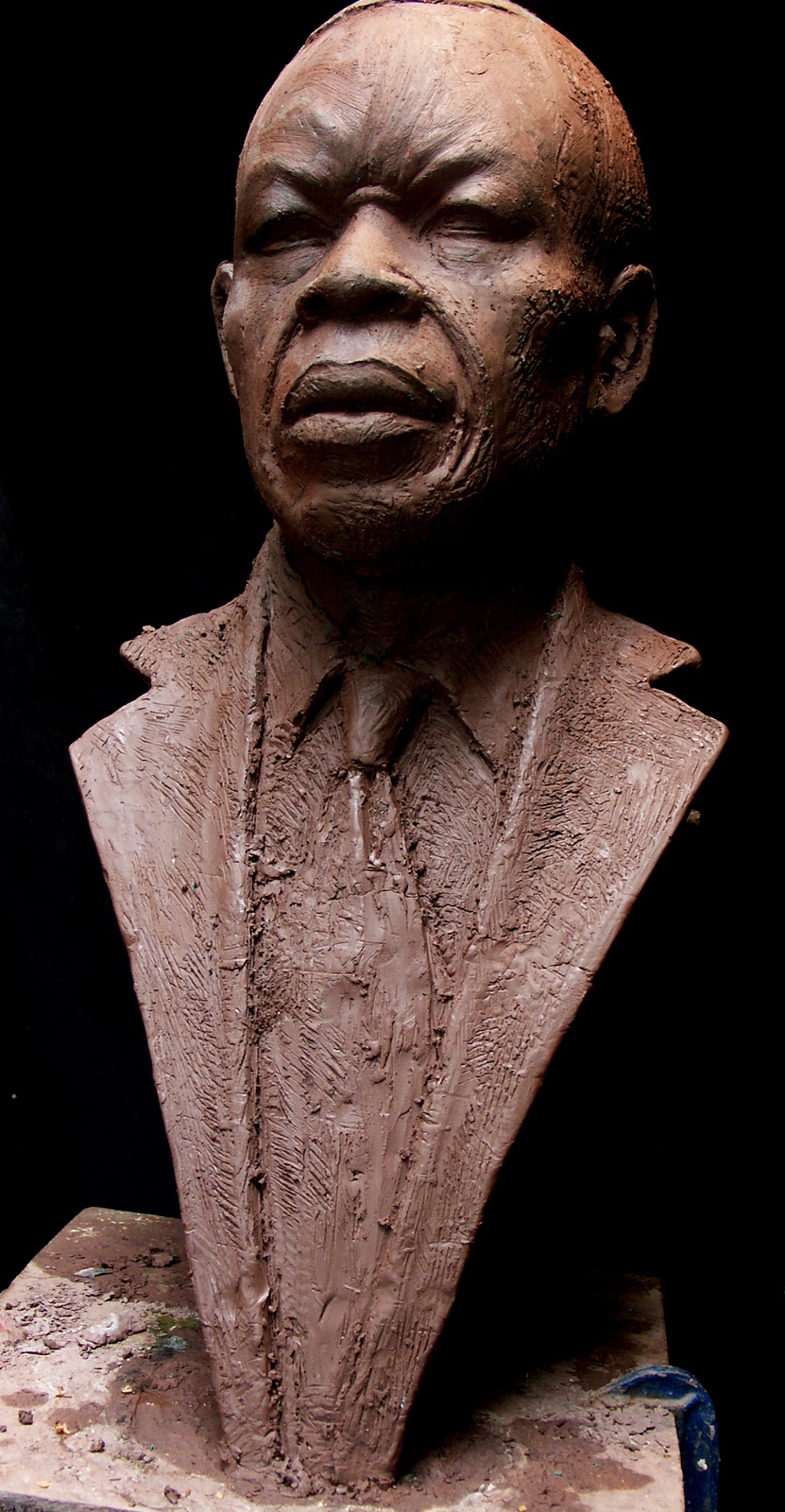
- A clay model – work in progress – for a bronze bust commissioned by the BCA from Fowokan
- Born: Lenford Alphonso (Kwesi) Garrison; 13 June 1943; Saint Thomas Parish, Jamaica
- Died: 18 February 2003 (aged 59); Brixton, London, England
- Education: Ruskin College; University of Sussex; Leicester University
- Occupations: Educationalist, historian and community activist
- Known for: ACER (Afro-Caribbean Educational Resource), Black Cultural Archives (BCA)

Lenford Alphonso (Kwesi) Garrison (13 June 1943 – 18 February 2003) was an educationalist, community activist and historian whose life's work was to catalogue the development of the black British identity and its history and promote the works of young black writers. To this end, he set up ACER (Afro-Caribbean Education Resource) and co-founded the Black Cultural Archives.

== Family and education ==
Len Garrison was born in St Thomas, Jamaica. His father, Ernest Samuel Garrison – a cabinet maker born in Hopewell, Hanover – and mother, Albertha Adassa Garrison, a school teacher born in Somerset, St Andrew, migrated to Britain in 1952 and 1953 respectively, and Len joined them there in west London in 1954 shortly before the birth of the first of his British siblings, sister Janet in May 1954. This was followed by the birth of his brothers, Owen (born July 1955), Albert (born October 1957) and Michael (born November 1959).

Garrison's early training was as a photographer, a passion from his childhood, which he studied at King's College London. He went on to become a specialist medical photographer at Guy's Hospital, as well as an active freelance photographer for the West Indian Gazette. His educationalist training began in 1971 when he attended Ruskin College, gaining a diploma in development studies. He later gained a BA degree in African history and Caribbean history from the University of Sussex, then went on to an MA in local history from Leicester University.

In 1987, he married his wife Marie, and they had a son, Tunde, born 10 December 1990.

== Publications ==
Following his degree from Sussex, Garrison was invited to represent Britain at FESTAC – the Festival of Arts and Culture in Nigeria in 1977 (Festac Town), where his presentation was based on his dissertation on the Rastafarian movement that he had written while at Ruskin College. Ansel Wong's brief biography of Garrison in the opening of Garrison's 1985 book of poetry, Beyond Babylon, reveals that the dissertation was subsequently developed into a book, now in its second reprint – Black Youth Rastafarianisim and Identity Crisis in Britain.

== Work and legacy ==
=== ACER ===
In his work on Rastafari and identity Garrison drew the conclusion that the British education system was failing black children as it denied the reality or existence of black history or culture. He believed that "Given the right opportunity [Black children] can become an asset to [British] society." He argued that what was required was an educational resource that was multi-cultural, recognising and acknowledging black history. In order to do this, he set up ACER (Afro-Caribbean Education Resource) in 1977. Its aim was to give black children a sense of identity and belonging to be proud of, and one that could be traced back to their African roots. It would make them black British citizens, with a part to play in multi-cultural Britain.

Garrison saw ACER as an archive of Black history from which educational material could be developed for school children of all ages and abilities. He campaigned for two years with the Inner London Education Authority (ILEA) and others for the funding and resources until 1977, when the ACER project was launched with Garrison as director. ACER's black history educational packs, first introduced at Dick Sheppard School in Brixton, went on to be used all over the country. Of the many schemes that ACER organised, the most successful was the Young Penmanship awards for creative writing about their reality and experience as Black young people in Britain. The award helped launch the careers of many black professionals, including the playwright Michael McMillan, novelist and barrister Nicola Williams, the music critic Clive Davis and Dr Michael Beckles. When ILEA was dismantled in 1988 ACER closed due to lack of funding. ACER's legacy can be seen today in black history being part of the mainstream British educational curriculum and its work has inspired the Dutch to develop similar multi-cultural learning.

In the late 1980s, Garrison took the ACER idea to Nottingham, where he became director of the ACFF (African Caribbean Family and Friends) Centre. There he was instrumental in establishing EMACA – East Midlands African Caribbean Arts – an organisation that promotes positive cultural practice in the arts, particularly the black visual arts. He also developed local history work around George Africanus, Nottingham's first black entrepreneur.

=== Black Cultural Archives ===
Garrison believed that "collecting and structuring the fragmented evidence of the Black past in Britain as well as in the Caribbean and Africa is a monumental task, but it is a major agenda item in [the] last decade of the 20th century [to create a] better basis for achieving a fully multicultural British society." To this end he co-founded the Black Cultural Archives (BCA) in 1981 and became a trustee.

The BCA's mission is to ensure that black history is properly recorded and available to all, and to correct "the historical omission" of black people of African descent from Britain's official history by ensuring that their true contributions are documented and celebrated. Doing so became the basis for achieving the fully multicultural British society that was Garrison's vision. The BCA won funding of £5million in 2010, and having been based in Kennington, moved back to Brixton to become the UK's first national black heritage centre. At the launch of the new BCA in Windrush Square on 24 July 2014, a bust of Garrison was unveiled.

== Commemoration ==
=== Brixton pound ===
Garrison appears on one of the banknotes of Brixton's independent currency, the Brixton pound.

=== 100 Great Black Britons ===
Garrison was named as one of 100 Great Black Britons who have helped to shape Britain, as listed in both 2003 and 2020, and featured in a book of the same name by Patrick Vernon.
