= Between Showers =

1914 silent film by Henry Lehrman

- Directed by: Henry Lehrman
- Written by: Reed Heustis
- Produced by: Mack Sennett
- Starring: Charlie Chaplin
- Cinematography: Frank D. Williams
- Production company: Keystone Studios
- Distributed by: Mutual Film Corporation
- Release date: February 28, 1914
- Running time: 15 minutes
- Country: United States
- Language: English

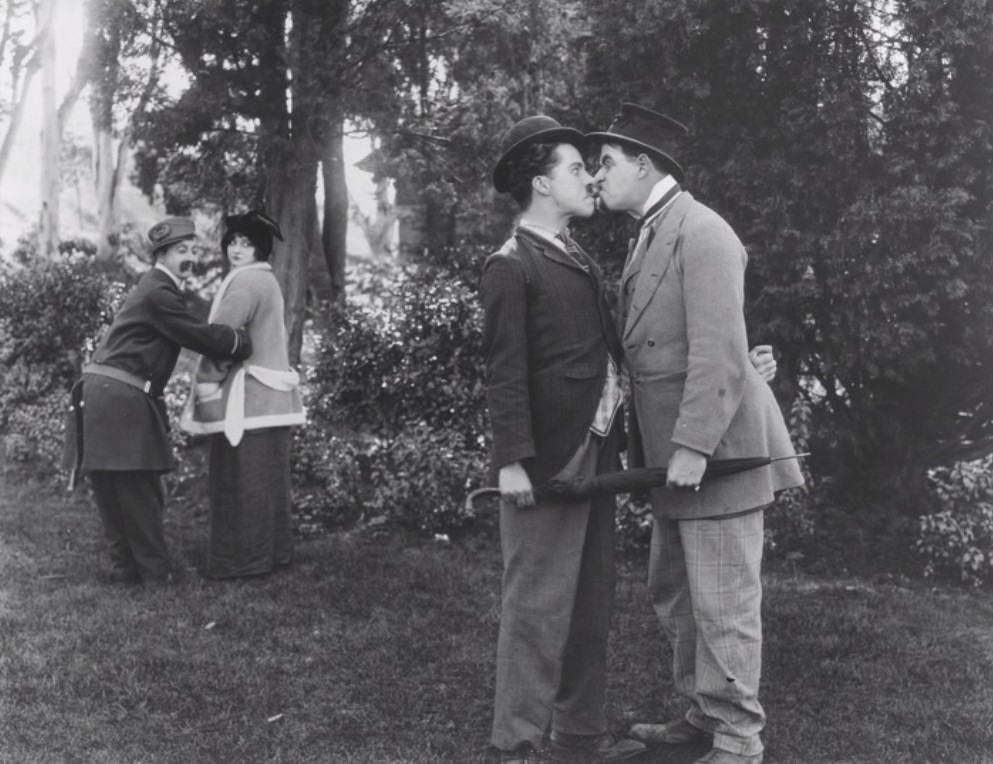
Showing Charlie Chaplin and Ford Sterling with the umbrella and Chester Conklin and Emma Clifton in the background left

Between Showers (1914)

Between Showers is a 1914 silent comedy short film made by Keystone Studios and directed by Henry Lehrman. It starred Charlie Chaplin, Ford Sterling, Emma Clifton, and Chester Conklin.

== Plot ==
Two young men, Masher and Rival Masher, fight over the chance to help a young woman cross a muddy street. The Rival Masher first sees the woman trying to cross and offers her an umbrella he stole from a policeman. He asks her to wait for him as he goes to get something to help her. The Masher comes along and offers the woman to help her cross the street as well and wait for his return. While the two mashers go to get logs, another policeman lifts the woman across the street. When the Rival Masher returns with the log, he is indignant that the woman did not wait for him to come back to help her cross the muddy street and demands the umbrella back. When the woman refuses, they engage in a fight which eventually involves the Masher.

== Cast ==
- Charlie Chaplin - Masher (The Tramp)
- Ford Sterling - Rival Masher
- Chester Conklin - Policeman
- Edward Nolan - Chivalrous Policeman
- Emma Clifton - Lady in Distress
- Sadie Lampe - Policeman's Lady Friend

== Review ==
A British movie magazine, The Cinema, provided this review of Between Showers: "[It's] a screamingly funny comedy, featuring Charles Chaplin and a charming girl. All the trouble is caused by an umbrella, and two men's rivalry for the favour of the lady. Their efforts to outdo each other in gallantry create many humorous situations."

== See also ==
- Charlie Chaplin filmography
