= Cinema Museum, London =

Museum in Kennington, London

Coordinates: 51.4923°N 0.1053°W

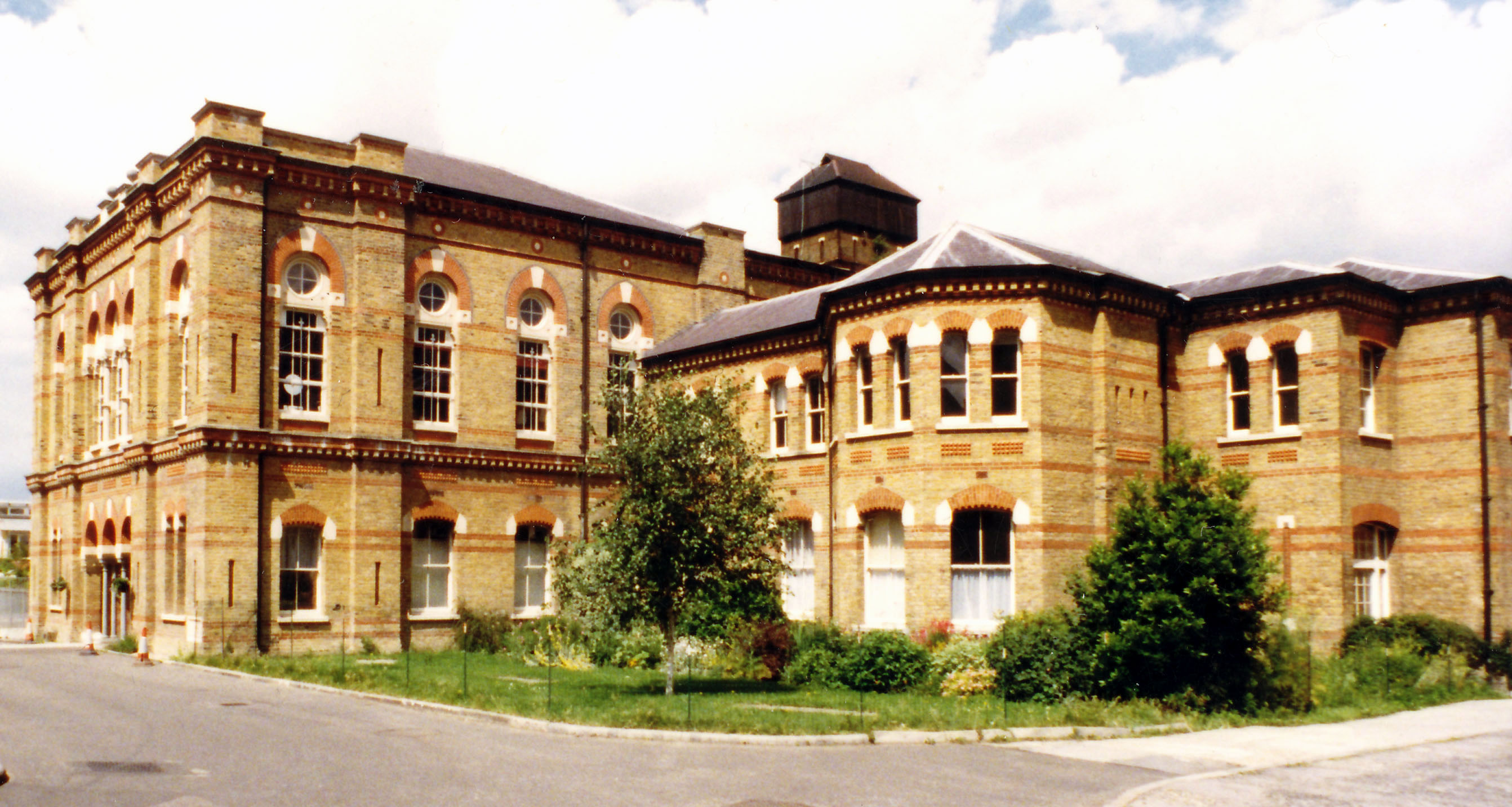
The old Master House at Lambeth Workhouse, now the Cinema Museum

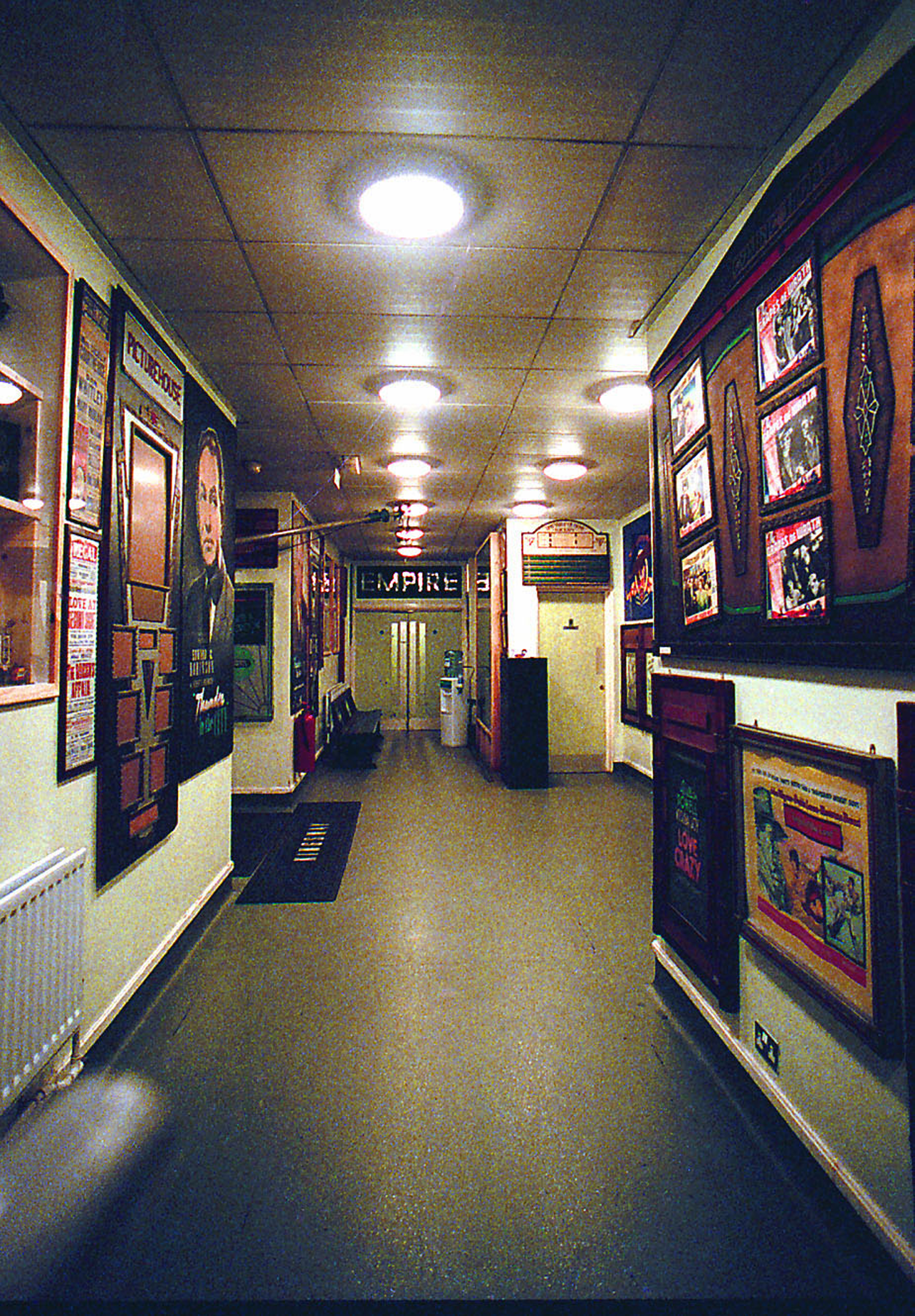
Exhibits on the walls of the Cinema Museum

The Cinema Museum is a museum in Kennington, London. Its collection was founded in 1986 by Ronald Grant and Martin Humphries, from their own private collection of cinema history and memorabilia. Its current building was once a workhouse where Charlie Chaplin lived as a child.

== History ==
First established in 1986 in Raleigh Hall in Brixton, the museum later moved to Kennington; since 1998, it has been based at 2 Dugard Way in the London Borough of Lambeth, the administration block of the former Lambeth Workhouse, in a building owned by the South London and Maudsley NHS Foundation Trust.

The workhouse has a link to cinema history as Charlie Chaplin lived there as a child when his mother faced destitution. The museum runs a programme of talks and events and is currently open by appointment for tours.

Having survived a threat to its existence owing to the proposed sale of the building in 2011, the museum was engaged in efforts to secure its future with public funding. The museum has been the subject of a documentary by The Guardian, and a 2008 documentary by the Canadian film artist Mark Lewis.

== Collection ==
Wikimedia UK short film about the Cinema Museum

The museum's collection includes items relating to film production, film exhibition and the experience of cinema-going from the earliest days of cinema to the present. It holds examples of every gauge of film projector, professional and amateur, ever manufactured.

The museum holds a collection of early films by Mitchell and Kenyon, the Blackburn film production company, dating from 1899 to 1906. These films were featured at the Pordenone Cinema Muto (silent film festival) in 1997.

According to Time Out, "The Cinema Museum in Lambeth boasts an idiosyncratic collection of film memorabilia, including posters, art deco cinema chairs, ushers' uniforms from the 1940s and '50s, tickets, ashtrays and popcorn cartons, as well as an archive boasting hundreds of books, an estimated one million plus photos and 17,000,000 feet (5,200,000 m) of film." At its events volunteers regularly dress in original cinema attendants' costumes.

The museum seeks to celebrate all aspects of cinema and the moving image. From silent films shown in exactly the correct gauge and at the right speed using specially adapted projectors, to screenings of modern television culture. It is developing a growing reputation for its eclectic range of events.

The cinema bar was rated the eighth-best pub in Kennington by readers of Londonist in 2013.

It is located near Elephant and Castle and Kennington tube stations.

== Sale of museum building ==
In 2017, it was announced that the South London and Maudsley NHS Foundation Trust which owns the building and leases it to the Museum, had decided to put the building up for sale on the open market. A campaign was launched with support from actors and filmmakers such as Ken Loach, and a petition to keep the Museum at the site gained over 52,000 signatures.

The developers who had bought the site gave the charity that runs the museum a period of time to buy the building and fundraising continues.

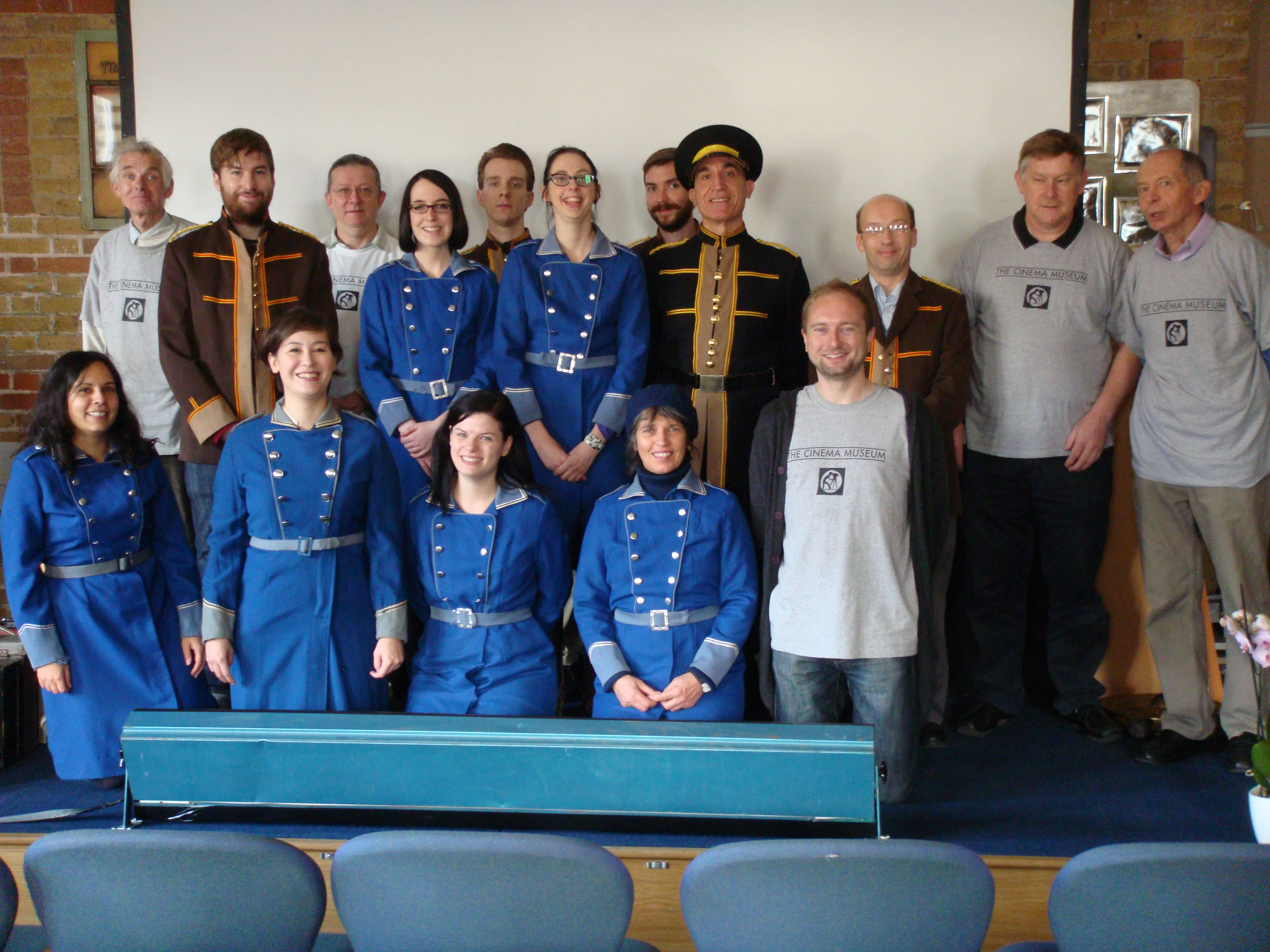
Volunteers dressed in original cinema uniforms

== Items from the collection ==
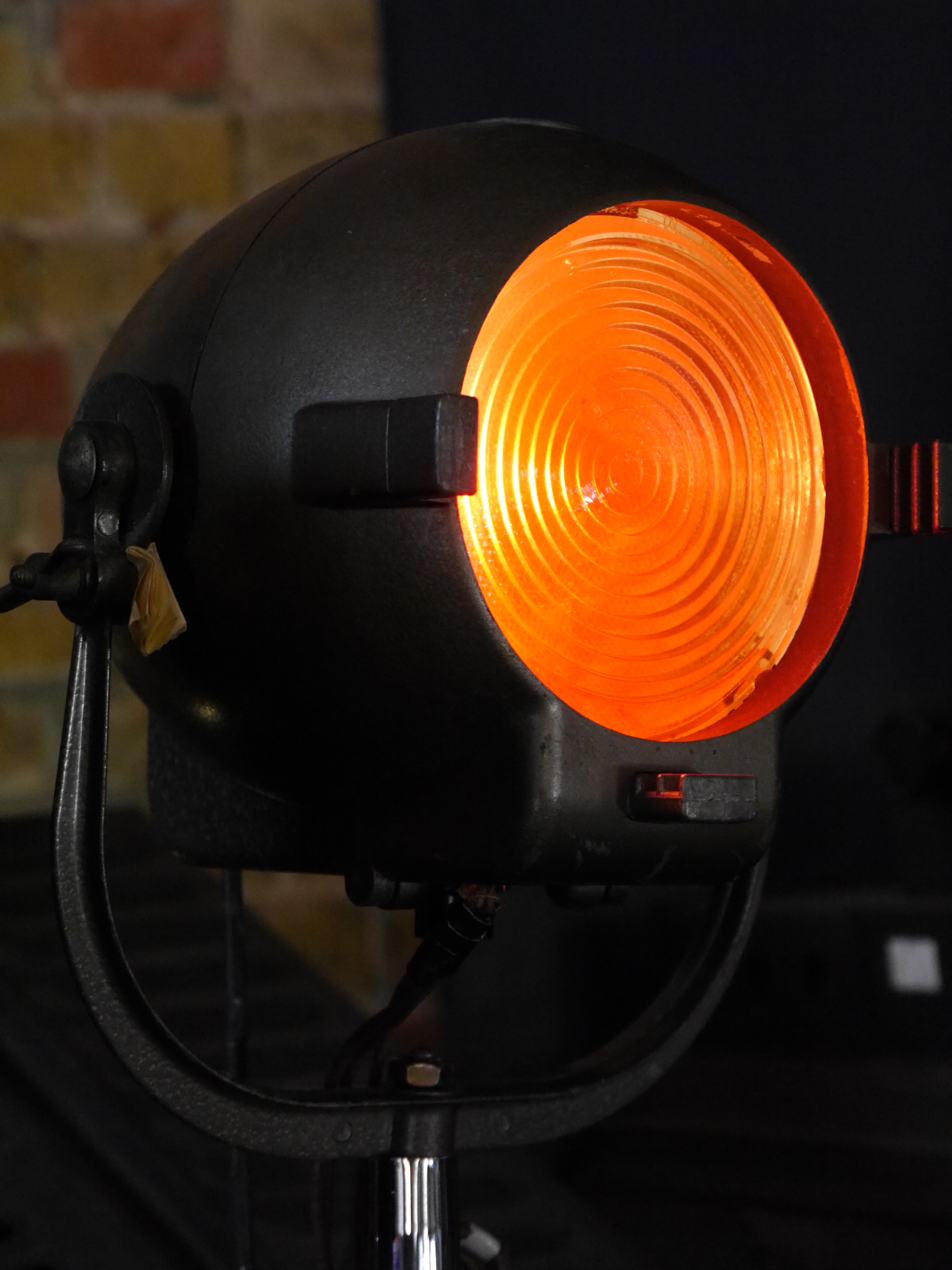
Spotlight

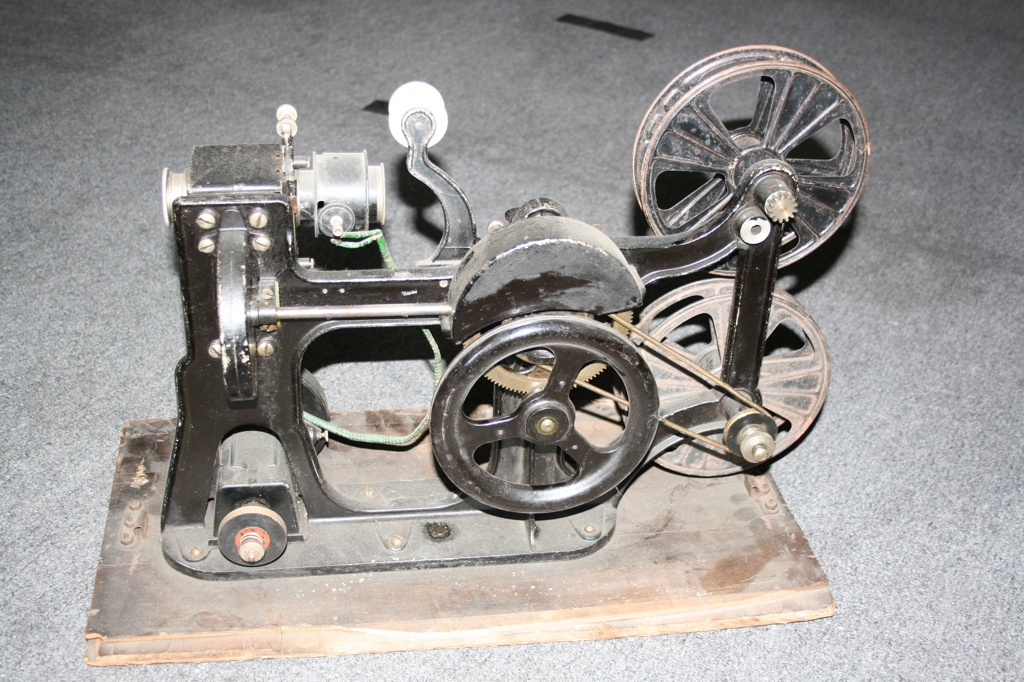
1912 Pathé KOK 28mm projector

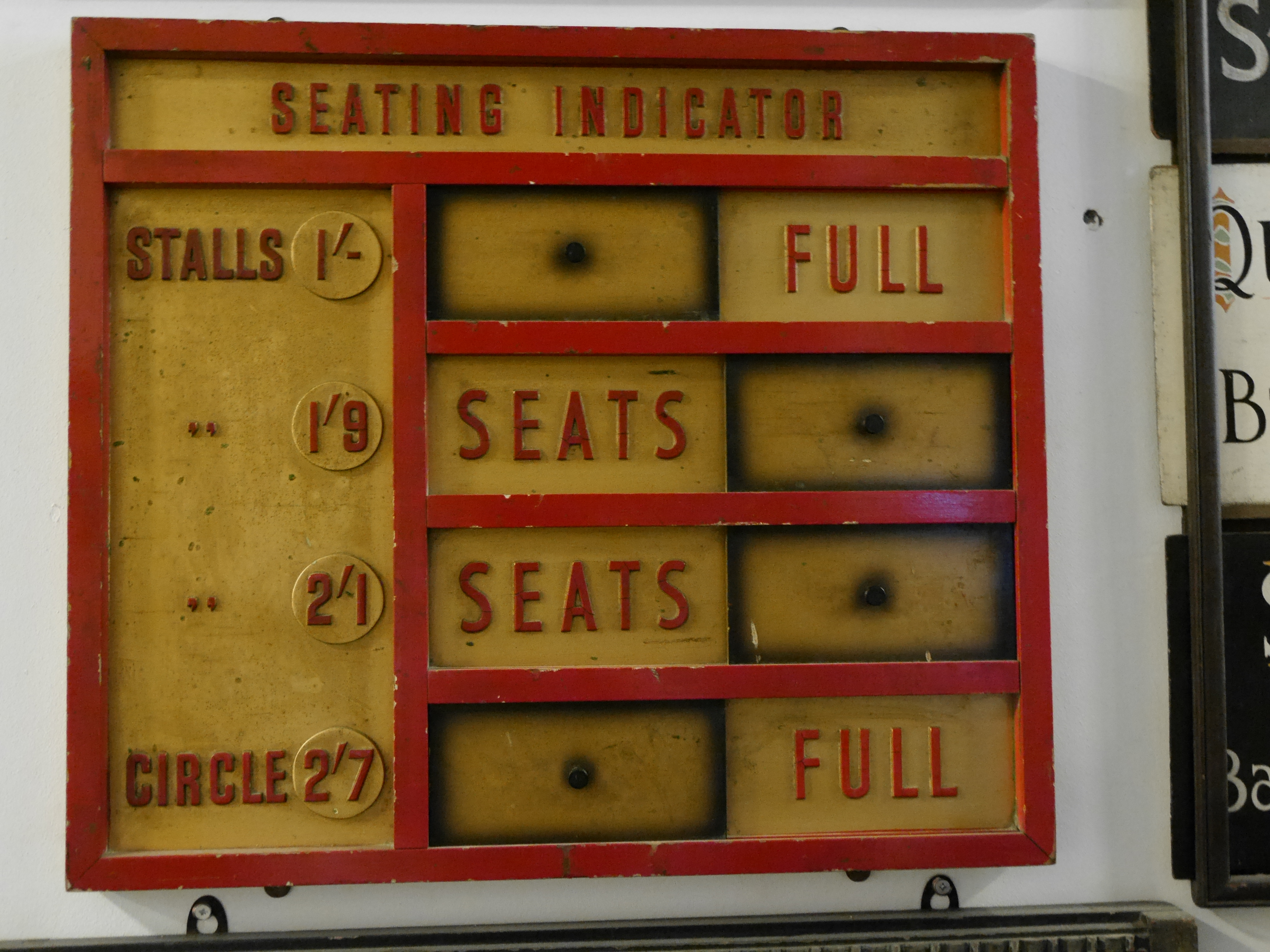
Wooden seating availability indicator

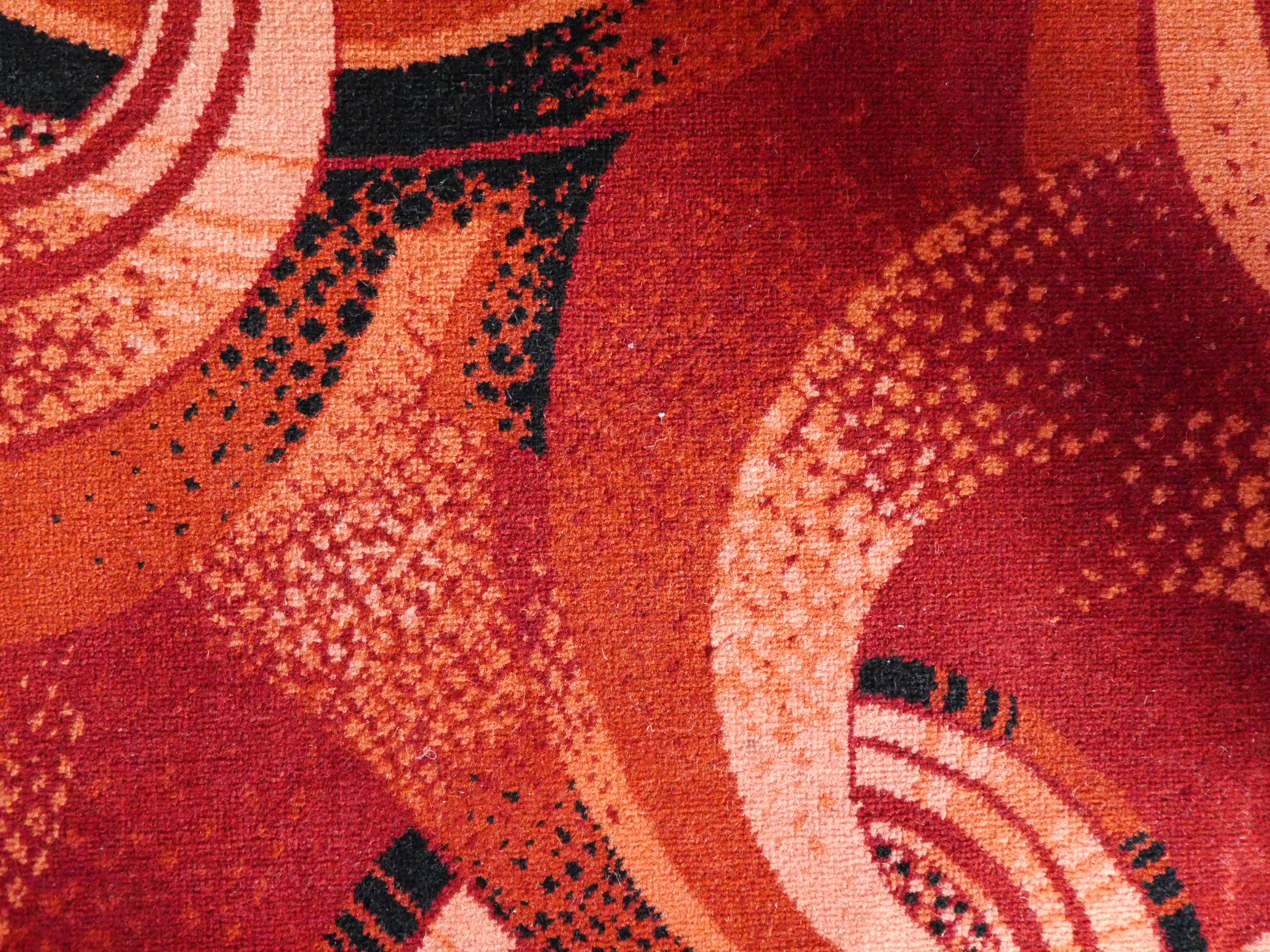
Cinema carpet

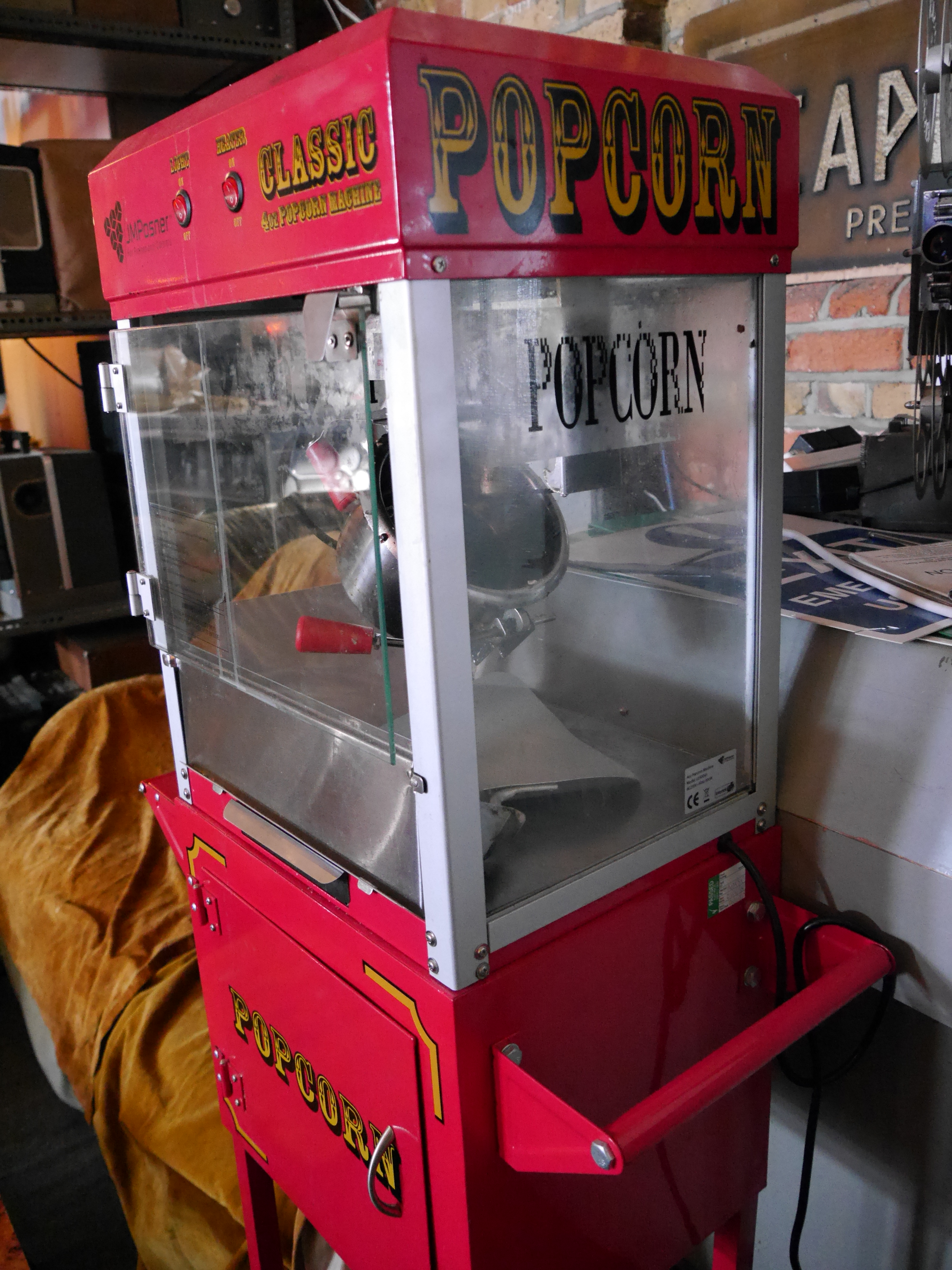
Popcorn machine

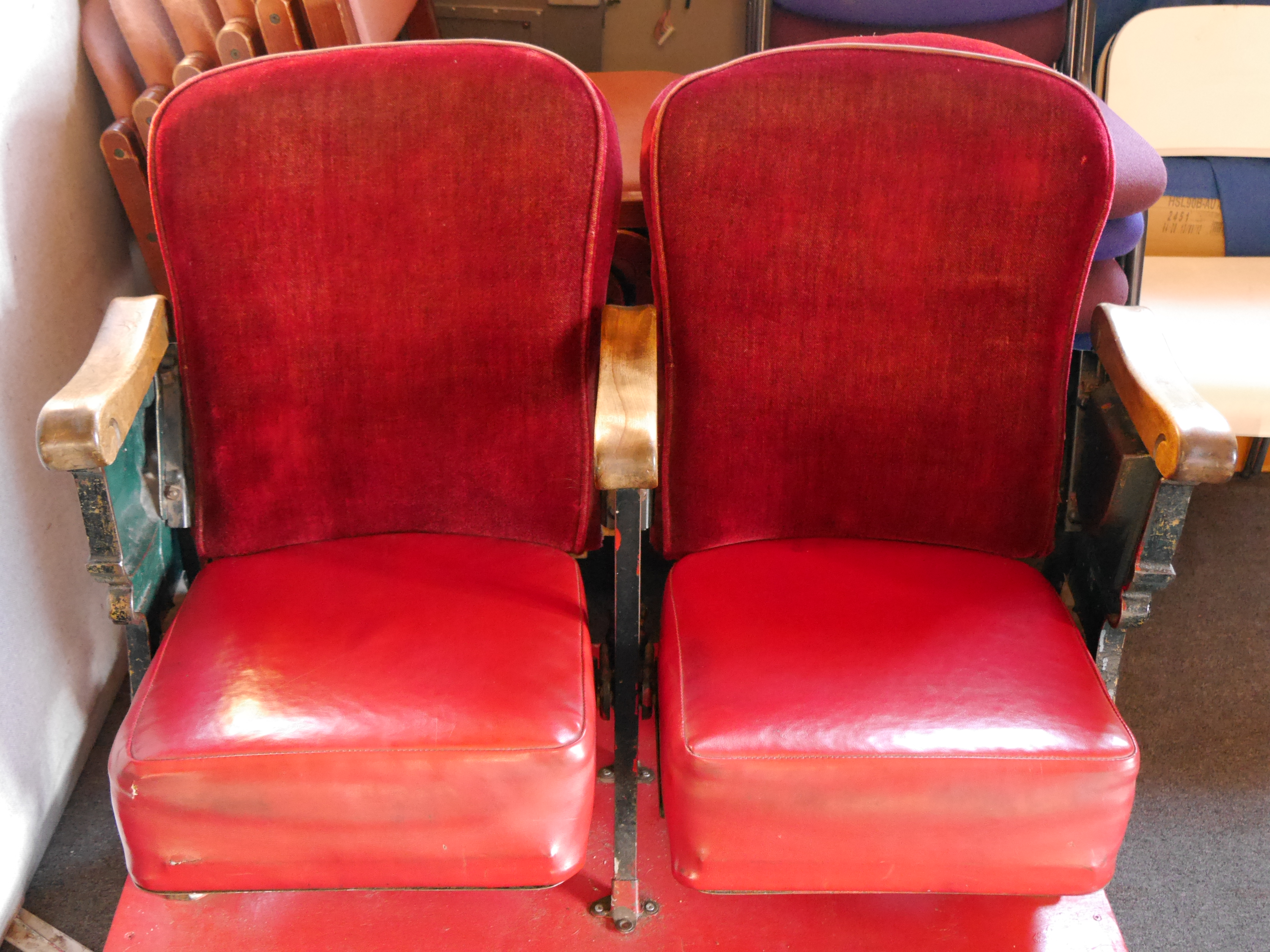
Seating

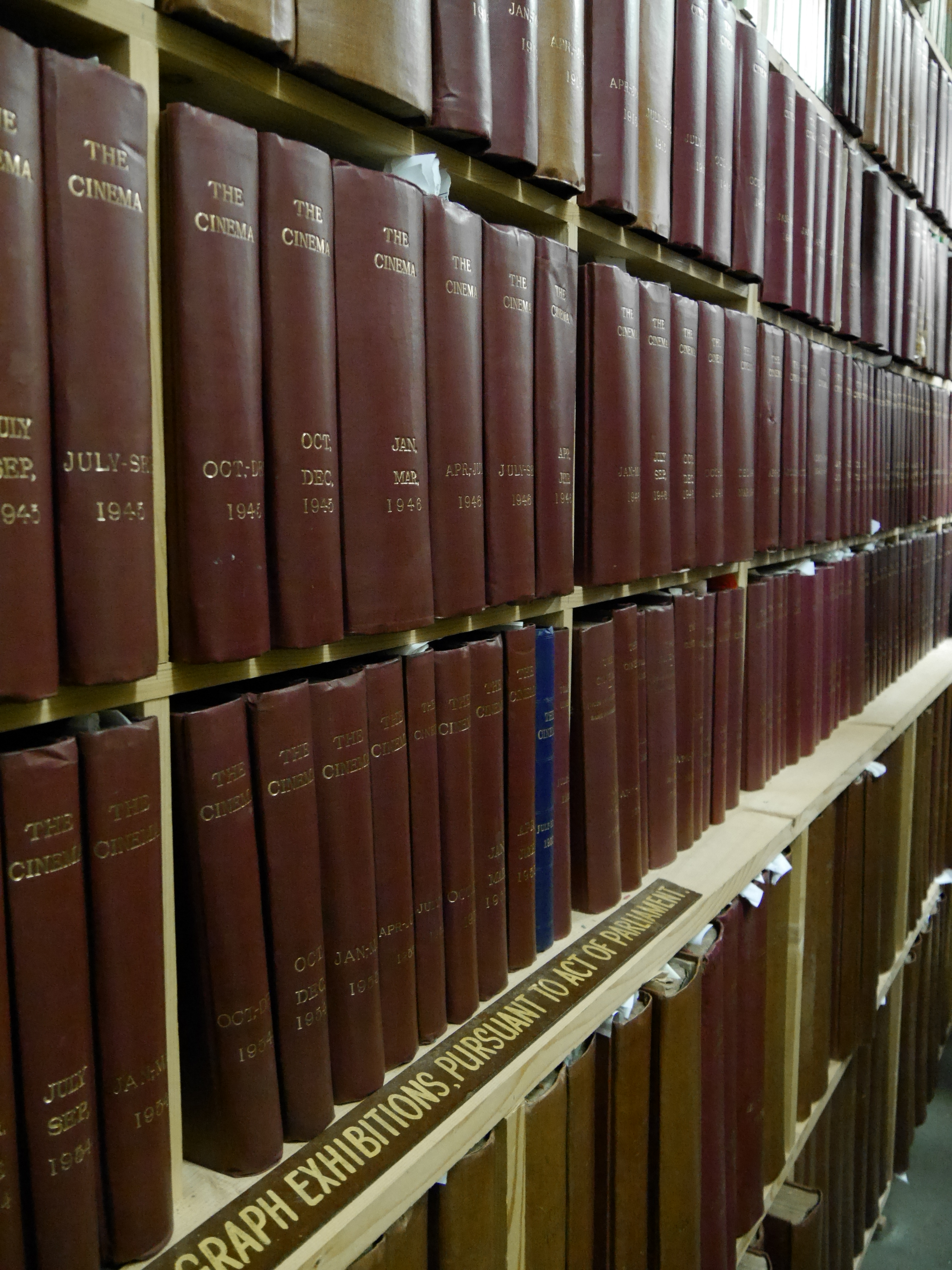
Bound volumes of The Cinema News and Property Gazette

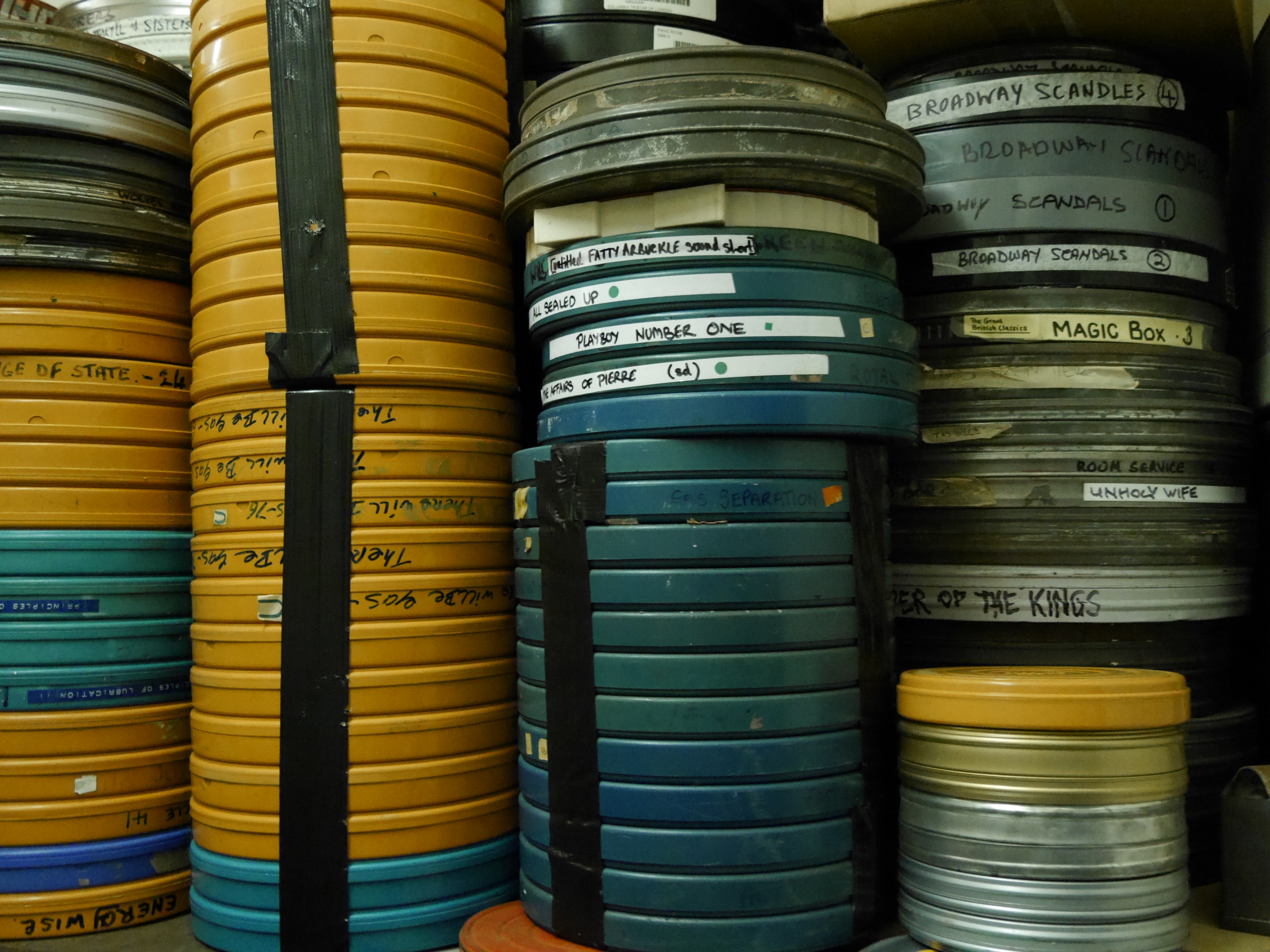
Film canisters

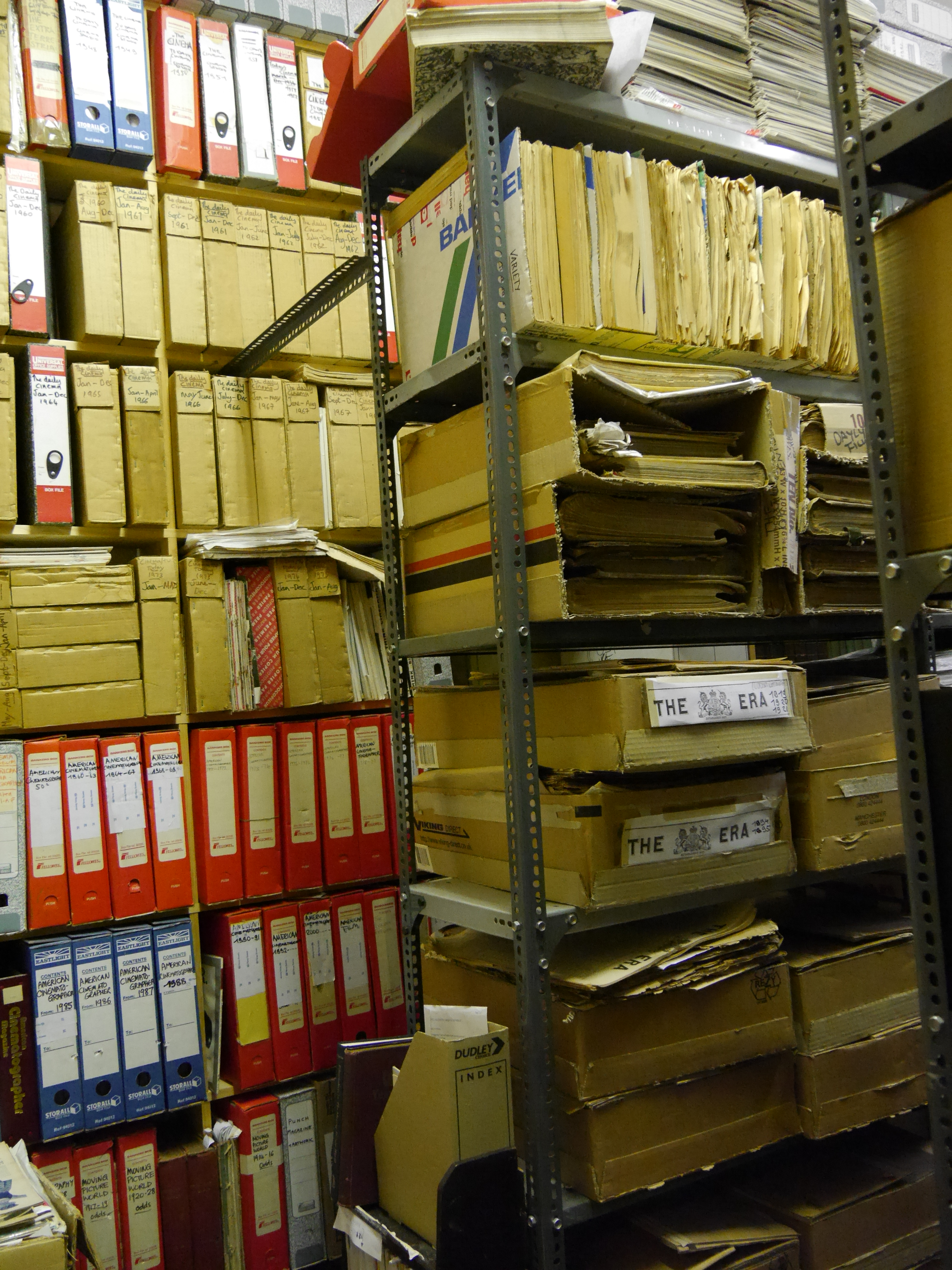
Records

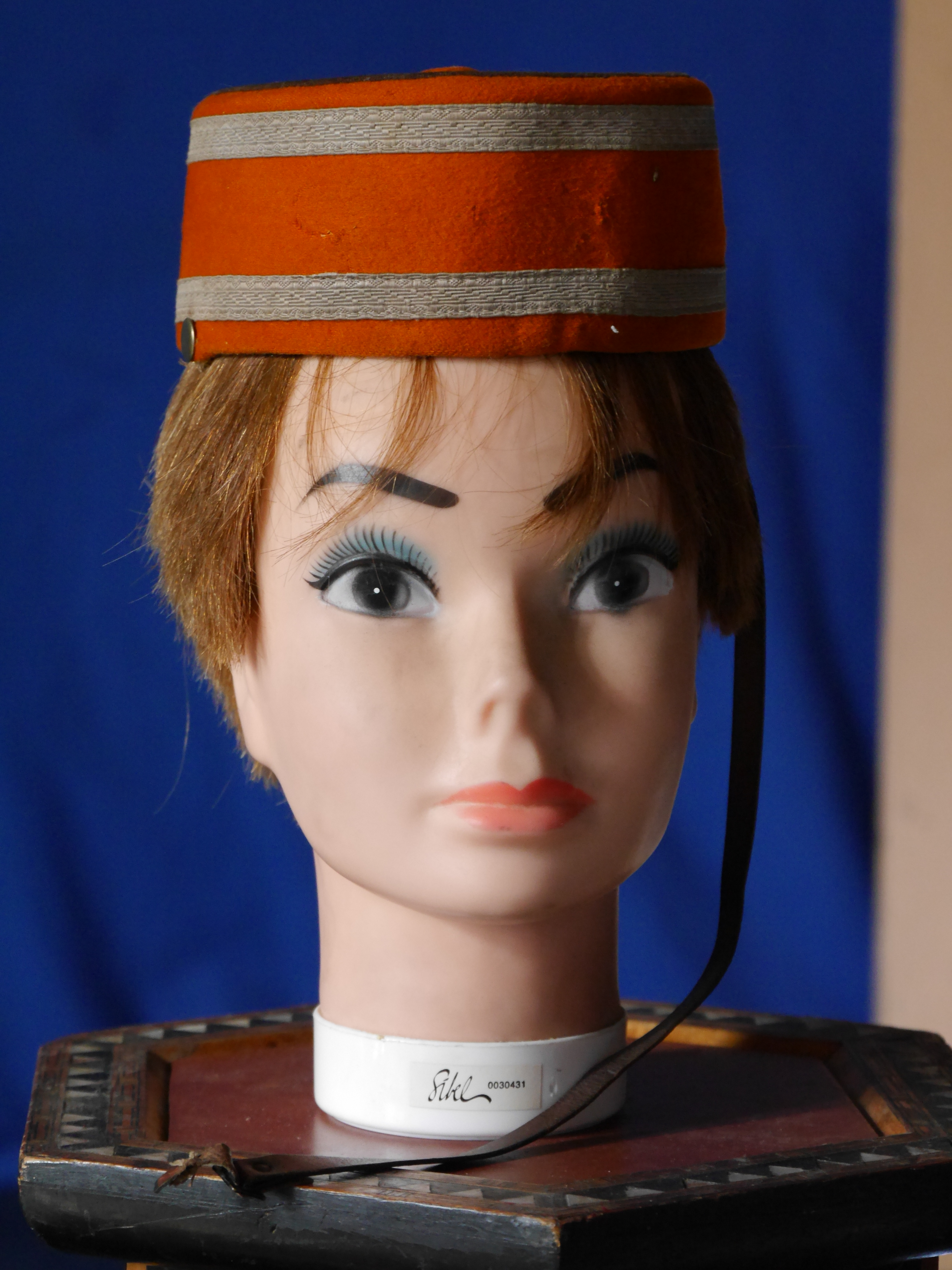
Usherette's hat

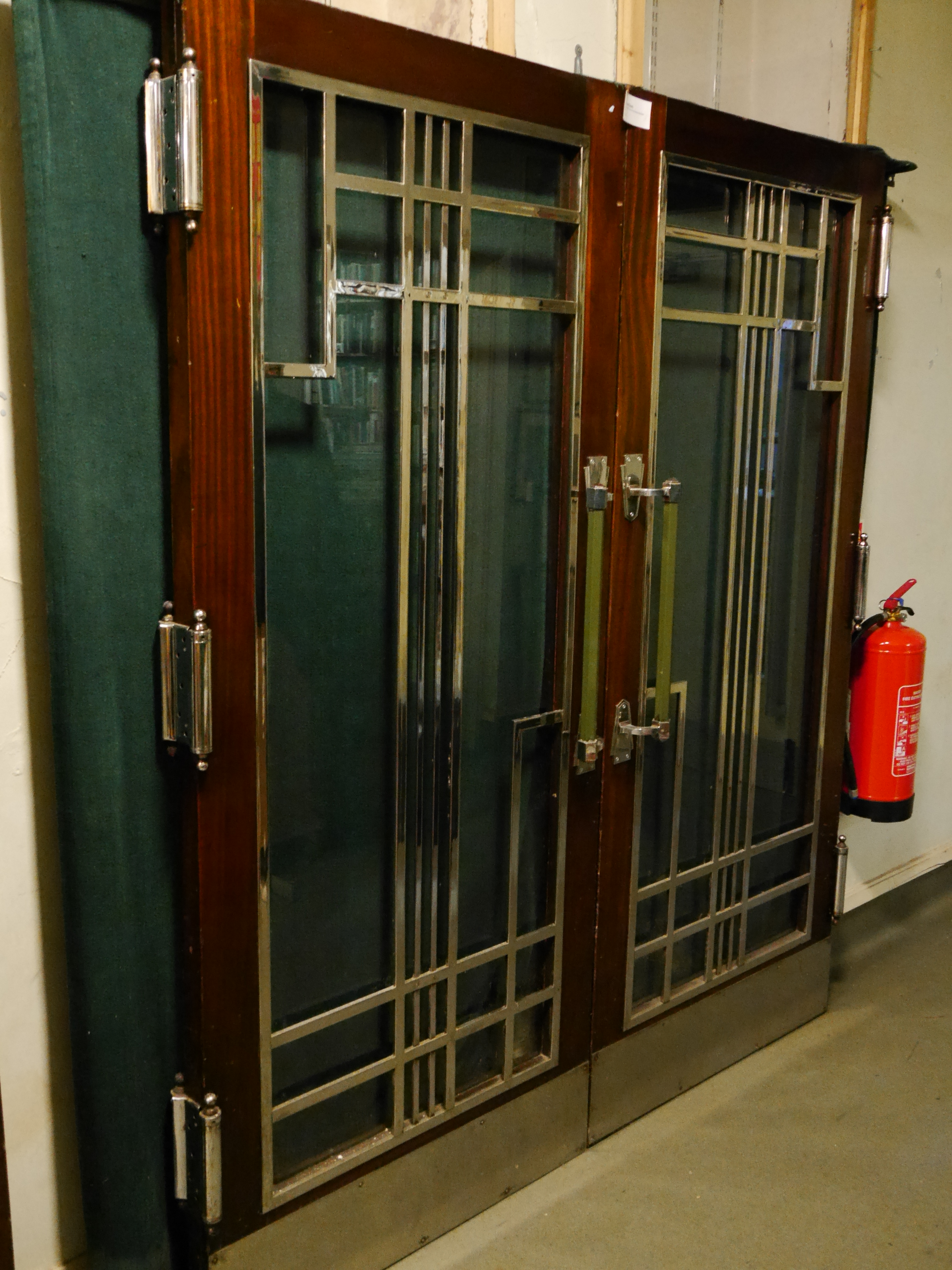
Entrance doors
