= George Africanus =

West African-born entrepreneur

George John Scipio Africanus (c. 1763 – 19 May 1834) was a West African former slave who became a successful entrepreneur in Nottingham, England.

== Early years ==
The early life of George Africanus is obscure. Calculating his birth year from his burial certificate, he was probably born in or about 1763. His obituary in the Nottingham Journal of 30 May 1834 states that he was born in a village in Sierra Leone, which became a British colony in 1787.

It is believed that George arrived in England in early 1766. On 31 March 1766, he was baptised George John Scipio Africanus, and described as a boy belonging to Benjamin Molineux of Molineux House, in the Collegiate church of St Peter in Wolverhampton.

When George was three years old Molineux began educating him. After Benjamin Molineux's death in 1772, his eldest son, George Molineux, inherited the estate and took responsibility for raising and educating the child. Growing up, Africanus probably worked as a servant in the Molineux family household, before becoming apprenticed to be a brass founder.

As an adult, Africanus moved to Nottingham, a place familiar to his adopted family. Benjamin Molineux's grandfather, Darcy Molineux (1652–1716), served as High Sheriff of Nottinghamshire in 1687, and Deputy Lieutenant of Nottinghamshire between 1698 and 1702. Darcy Molineux raised George Molineux's father John (1685–1754) in Mansfield, Nottinghamshire, before settling in Wolverhampton around 1700. The family Molineux came from Teversal near Mansfield in the county of Nottinghamshire.

Africanus may have become interested in Nottingham after visiting on the way home from the funeral. A relative in his adopted family, Sir William Molineux, 6th Baronet of Teversall, died near Mansfield in 1781. Members of the Wolverhampton Molineux family, including Africanus, may have passed through Nottingham town centre, a town of 18,000 people then, full of beautiful open-air gardens and pleasing surroundings.

== Starting a business ==
Africanus moved to St Peter's Parish, Nottingham, at the age of 21 around 1784. He met a local girl, Esther (sometimes spelled Ester) Shaw, and they were married on 3 August 1788 at St. Peter's Church, Nottingham. Around 1793, they started up an employment agency, Africanus' Register of Servants, operating from their home at 28 Chandlers Lane. If the business was not bringing in sufficient income, Africanus may have performed other jobs for support; while their 1788 marriage bond document states that he was a Brass Founder by trade, trade directories of the time list him as a waiter and labourer as well. Following his death in 1834, his wife Esther remained in the house and continued to run the family business.

After she died on 12 May 1853, a notice appeared in the Nottingham Review, stating: "Yesterday (Thursday), aged 85 years, Mrs. Africanus, for upwards of sixty years proprietor of the Servants' Register Office in Chandlers Lane." If this account is correct, then Ester ran the Servants' Register Office on Chandler's lane from at least 1793. Africanus bought 28 Chandlers Lane and adjoining properties in Bluchers Yard for £380 on 24 October 1829.

== Family life ==
Africanus and his wife had seven children, but only one lived to adulthood. While no descendants carry the Africanus family surname, his bloodline continued for some time. Daughter Hannah married Samuel Cropper (1802–1886/7), a watch and clock maker, at St. Mary's Church, Nottingham, in 1825. They had three children: Sarah Ann Cropper (1825–1842), George Africanus Cropper (1838–1839) and Esther Africanus Cropper (1840–1911).

Granddaughter Esther married Charles Edward Turnbull at St. Mary's Church, Nottingham, on 28 September 1865. They lived at 9 St. Paul's Crescent, St. Pancras, London. Esther died at the age of 69 in Kingston, Surrey. The 1881 census indicates that she had three children: Arthur (aged 14), Fredrick (13), and Margaret Hannah (9).

According to the Last Will and Testament of George Africanus, he was unhappy with Hannah's marriage to Samuel Cropper. Hannah and Samuel Cropper lived apart for years until after the death of George Africanus. The 1841 census shows Hannah and Samuel Cropper living on Chandlers Lane with her 70-year-old mother, Esther, who was still working as proprietress of the register of servants office at the time.

Africanus's will also indicates that his granddaughter, Sarah Ann Cropper, was "afflicted" in some unstated way; she died at the age of 17, so may have had a serious illness.

== Burial place and legacy ==
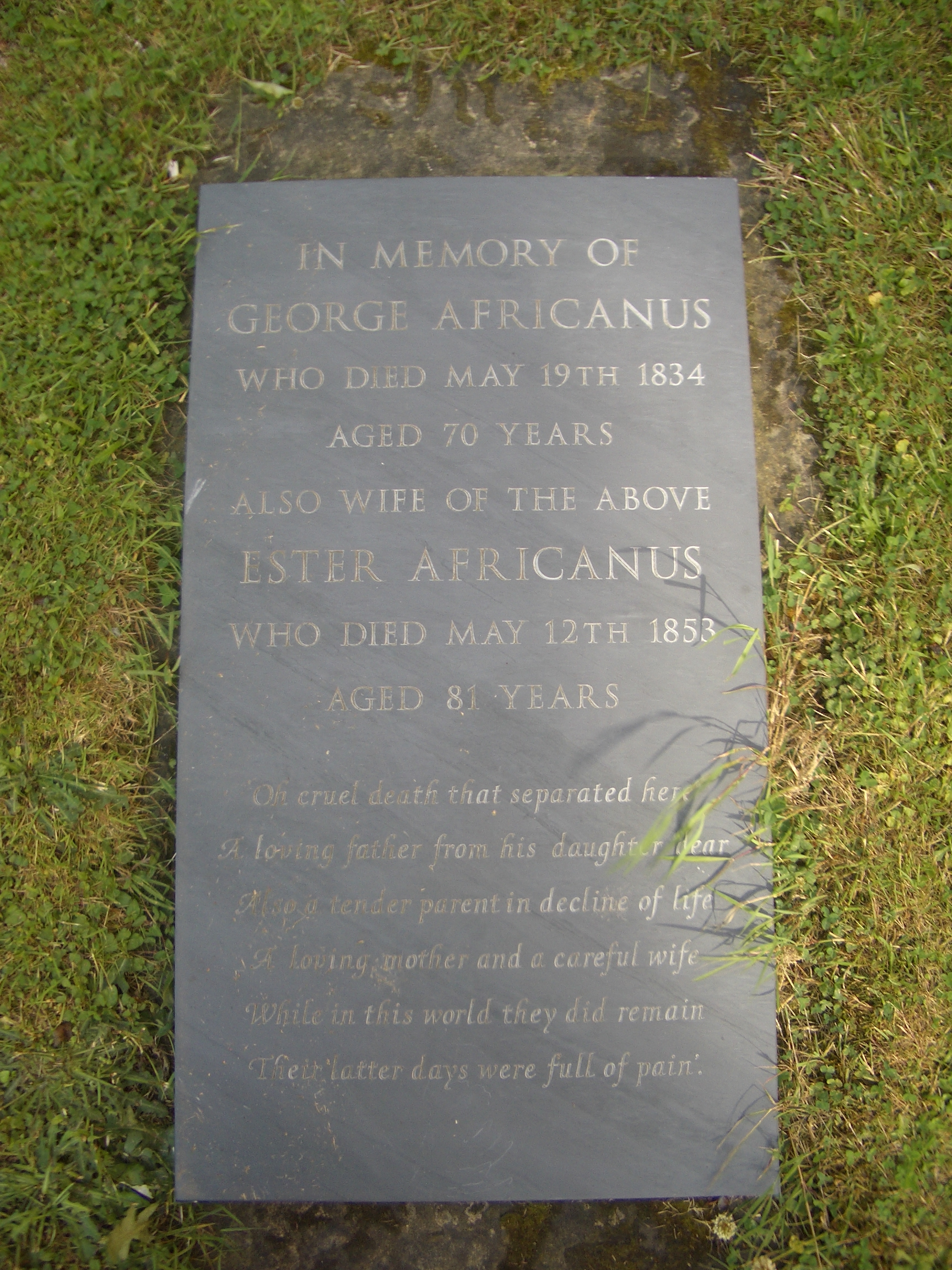
Epitaph in St. Mary's Church, Nottingham

Len Garrison, director of Afro-Caribbean Family and Friends (AcFF), ensured that Africanus was included in Nottingham Castle's 1993 Black Presence exhibition. It was only in 2003 that, after painstaking research, Africanus's grave was uncovered, despite its worn inscription, in the churchyard of St. Mary's Church, Nottingham. His wife was buried alongside him. Their children are buried in a separate grave nearby.

A gravestone bearing an epitaph now reads:

In Memory of George Africanus
Who died 19 May 1834
Aged 70 years
Also Ester Africanus, wife of the above
Who died 12 May 1853?
Aged 81 years

Oh cruel death that separated here
A loving father from his daughter dear
Also a tender parent in decline of life
A loving mother and a careful wife
While in this world they did remain
Their latter Days were full of pain

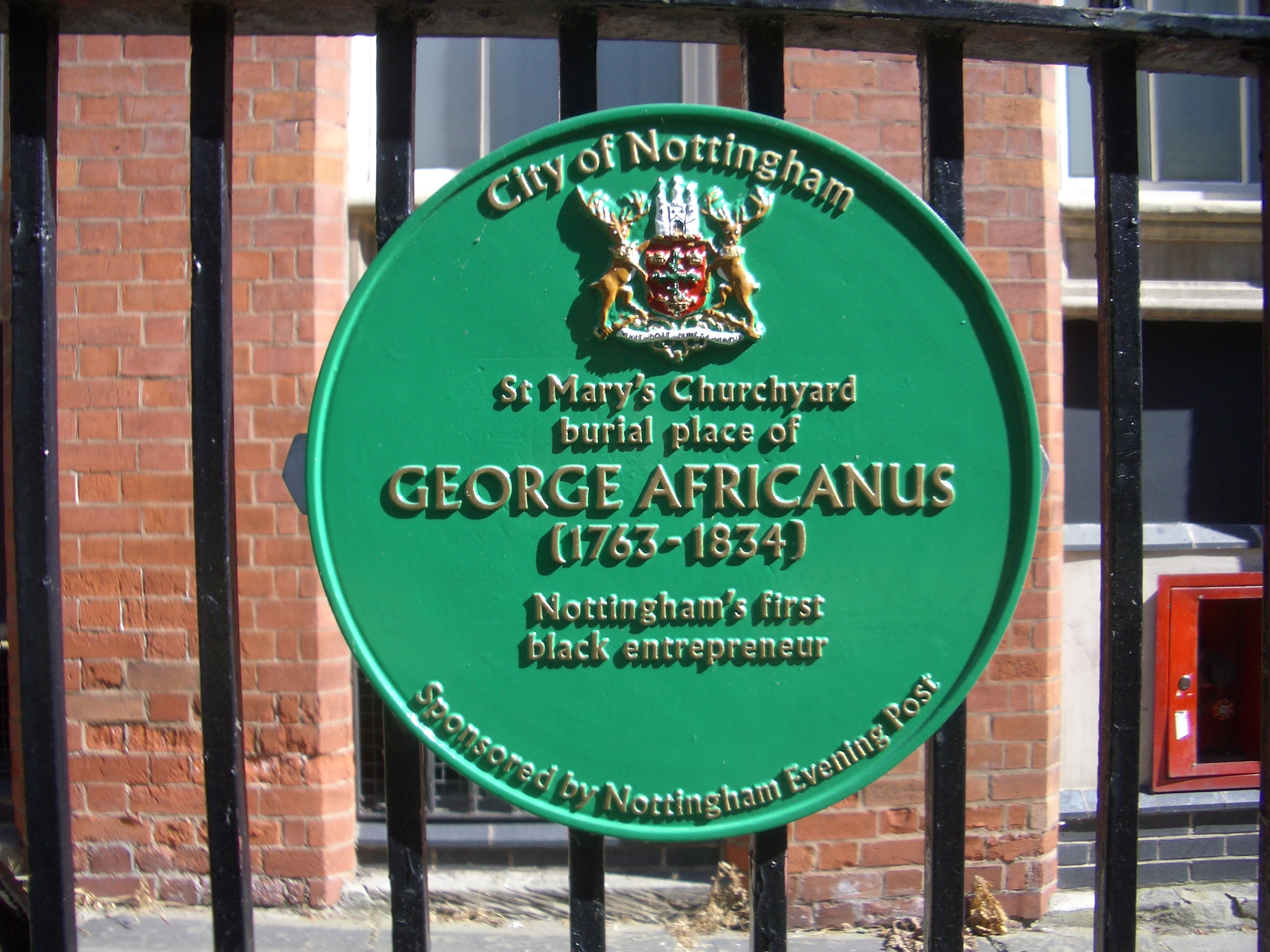

A memorial green plaque in memory of Africanus, "Nottingham's first black entrepreneur", was unveiled on St. Mary's churchyard railings in April 2003, and in October 2014 his place of business and residence, formerly 28 Chandlers Lane, was recognised with a blue heritage plaque erected by the Nubian Jak Community Trust.

On 25 March 2007, as part of the events taking place to commemorate the 200th Anniversary of Abolition of Slave Trade Act, an hour-long service was held at St. Mary's Church, High Pavement, Nottingham, at the end of which a new memorial stone was dedicated by religious leaders. The Bishop of Kingston (Jamaica), the Rt Revd Robert Thompson, preached at the service. In the same month, an exhibition was held at Nottingham Council House celebrating the life of Africanus, displaying documents and illustrations connected with his life in Wolverhampton and Nottingham.

Nottingham Express Transit tram number 234 bears his name.
