= Rush Common =

Protected open space in London, England

- Interactive map of Rush Common
- Type: Public park
- Location: Brixton, London
- Coordinates: 51°27′21″N 0°07′7″W
- Owner: Lambeth London Borough Council
- Open: All year
- Website: www.lambeth.gov.uk/parks/rush-common

Rush Common is a linear protected open space and former common land in Brixton, London, England. It was enclosed in 1806 with the sections fronting public highways protected from development as proscribed land. Most of this now forms private gardens and forecourts. In 1821, some of the land was released to build St Matthew's Church. Unauthorised development in the late 18th and early 19th centuries caused the London County Council to seek powers of enforcement which were granted in 1947. With a presumption against building, Lambeth Council now has the power to authorise or prohibit the construction of permanent structures on the proscribed land. Since 1905, sections of the proscribed land have been purchased to provide public open spaces. The first of these was the Tate Library Garden that is now part of Windrush Square. Portions of land adjacent to Brixton Hill are a public park managed by Lambeth Council, including a community orchard and woodland walk.

== History ==
=== Enclosure of the common ===
Rush Common was common land in the manor of Lambeth. The former common land (also sometimes known as Rushey Common or Rushey Green) was a triangle in the parish of Lambeth bounded by Brixton Hill, Effra Road and Josephine Avenue. It also continued in a salient down Brixton Hill reaching the parish of Streatham. Rush Common and Norwood Common were the largest parcels of land, but there were many more smaller areas that made up a total of 400 acres (160 ha) in the parish.

By the beginning of the 19th century, Lambeth had a growing population and the common land was being used for recreation. In 1806, it was proposed that the common land should be inclosed and the chief beneficiaries would be the Archbishop of Canterbury, Charles Manners-Sutton, who was Lord of the Manor of Lambeth, and Edward Thurlow, 1st Baron Thurlow. Objections were made by Lambeth residents and also from Southwark. As well as loss of amenity from losing access to the land, the petitioners against inclosure expressed fear that land would soon be built upon, and that would restrict the free circulation of air.

Rush Common (Lambeth and Wandsworth) Act 1806
- Act of Parliament
- Parliament of the United Kingdom
- Long title: An Act for inclosing lands in the manor of Lambeth, in the county of Surrey.
- Citation: 46 Geo. 3. c. lvii

Dates
- Royal assent: 23 May 1806

Text of statute as originally enacted

It was enclosed by the Rush Common (Lambeth and Wandsworth) Act 1806 (46 Geo. 3. c. lvii). However, the legislation also prohibited building on around 34.5 acres (0.140 km^{2}) of land fronting public highways. This provision was unusual for an inclosure. In 1810, the layout of Effra Road and St Matthew's Road, new roads to give access to the land, were confirmed by the inclosure commissioners. Upkeep of roads was initially undertaken by the occupiers of the land, but they became the responsibility of the parish in 1823.

The 1806 legislation provided that land could be released for use by the Church of England for new churches and burial grounds if required by an increase in population. In 1821, some of the proscribed land that had been allocated to the Archbishop of Canterbury was permitted to be used by the Commissioners for Building New Churches to construct St Matthew's Church. (Note: The building of St Matthew's Church on part of the proscribed land was authorised by the Lambeth Inclosure Act 1821.)

=== Enforcement of proscribed land ===
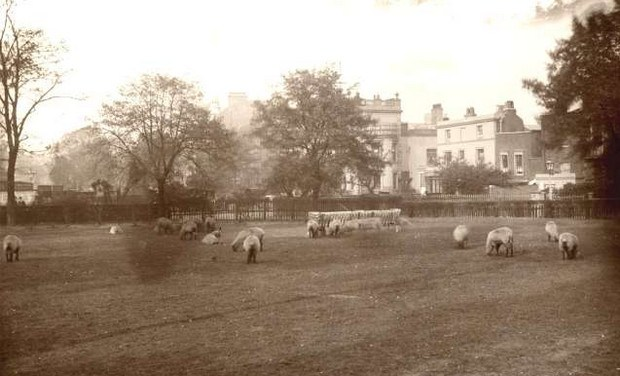
Sheep graze at Brixton Oval around 1892

The proscribed land provisions of the 1806 legislation could only be enforced by an injured party, such as a neighbouring property owner. In 1859, the threat of using these power prevented construction of a building on Brixton Road. At the northern end, the proscribed land reached a point outside 405 Brixton Road, just to the north of Brixton Station Road. In 1875, unauthorised development of shops started to appear. However, they could not be challenged by the Metropolitan Board of Works using the 1806 legislation as they were not an injured party. However, the expansion of this type of development southward was successfully prevented in 1885. (Note: Speculated by Sheppard to be through the action of another property owner.) The Brixton Tate Library completed in 1893 and the Brixton Theatre in 1896 (now the site of the Ritzy Cinema) were both party built on proscribed land.

In 1891, the building of Arodene Road and Helix Road were permitted by the London County Council (LCC), subject to the provisions of the 1806 act. This was ignored by developers and houses were built on prescribed land. In 1901, the LCC attempted to use the provisions of the 1806 legislation to prevent unauthorised building on land between Josephine Road and Arodene Road. However, as they were not an injured party they were not able to proceed. Lambeth Council tried to find an affected party willing to take forward a claim, who the LCC would support. The lack of competence over the proscribed land meant the council required fresh legislation to deal with each dispute. Specific powers were gained in 1924 for 429-467 Brixton Road, in 1938 for 415-427 Brixton Road, and in 1939 for land between Coldharbour Lane and Rushcroft Road. In 1946, the LCC resolved to seek powers to control development on all of the land. The council gained these powers from the London County Council (General Powers) Act 1947 (10 & 11 Geo. 6. c. xlvi). (Note: The power to authorise or refuse the building of permanent structures on the proscribed land has been held by Lambeth London Borough Council since the Local Government Reorganisation (Miscellaneous Provision) Order 1988.)

In 1950, Lambeth Council authorised the construction of an underground Civil Defence centre and an above-ground building on prescribed land. The building was temporary with permission set to expire in 1968.

=== Conversion to public space ===
In 1904, the land outside the Brixton Library that was known as Brixton Oval, and was entirely within the proscribed land, was purchased by Amy Tate to be laid out as a public garden. The land was considered an eyesore and there had been complaints about advertising hoardings that were installed around it in 1900. The council had attempted to buy the land in 1901 but the price of £3,000 (equivalent to £318,810 in 2025) was considered excessive. The land was purchased for £3,250 (equivalent to £341,664 in 2025) and was gifted by Amy Tate to Lambeth Council. It was formally opened as the Tate Library Garden on 11 October 1905, featuring a bronze memorial bust of Henry Tate.

In 1957, Lambeth Council proposed converting 12.74 acres (5.16 ha) of proscribed land to a public open space. The changes required an update to the London Development Plan. Most of the land was private gardens that the council said had become derelict and uncared for. 1.5 acres (0.61 ha) was made up of shops and flats that had been built as unauthorised development. The council sought to demolish these in order to provide a continuous 'woodland walk' park. At the public inquiry held at Lambeth Town Hall in 1964, the demolition was objected to by the landowner and shop tenants. The changes were authorised in September 1964 with demolition not expected to start until 1972. In March 1965, the LCC approved development of the St Matthew's Estate on land abutting the proscribed land. Development of the woodland walk was delayed until November 1973 due anticipated dual carriageway road widening that did not go ahead.

== Geography ==
=== Proscribed land ===
The proscribed land is within 150 feet (46 m) of the London to Croydon Turnpike Road (now the A23 road), 200 feet (61 m) of the south and east boundaries of the common (now Helix Gardens and Josephine Avenue) and 100 feet (30 m) of any buildings already on the common. (Note: Building at 95 Brixton Hill is an example of this.) St Matthew's Church is outside the proscribed land.

=== Public park ===
Some sections along Brixton Hill have been purchased by Lambeth London Borough Council and operated as a public open space. The four main portions are (from north to south):

- Brixton Orchard, next to Brixton town centre
- Rush Common Woodland Walk, adjacent to St Matthew’s Estate
- Pencil Park, adjacent to Endymion Road
- Large area adjacent to the Roupell Park Estate

The public sections are a site of nature conservation interest. They hold a Green Flag Award.

== Governance ==
Lambeth London Borough Council has the right to take action to enforce the prohibition of building on prescribed land. With a presumption against building, the council has the ability to grant or refuse consent for "buildings or erections above the surface of the earth". Consent for building is entirely separate from the usual town and country planning consent that might also be required. Unlike for a regular planning application, there is no fee or right of appeal. The only recourse is a High Court judicial review. Decisions can be delegated to officers where there are no objections received, otherwise they are passed to a committee. Rush Common is not registered common land.
