= Black Cultural Archives =

Archive and heritage centre in London

Coordinates: 51.4603°N 0.1147°W

Black Cultural Archives BCA

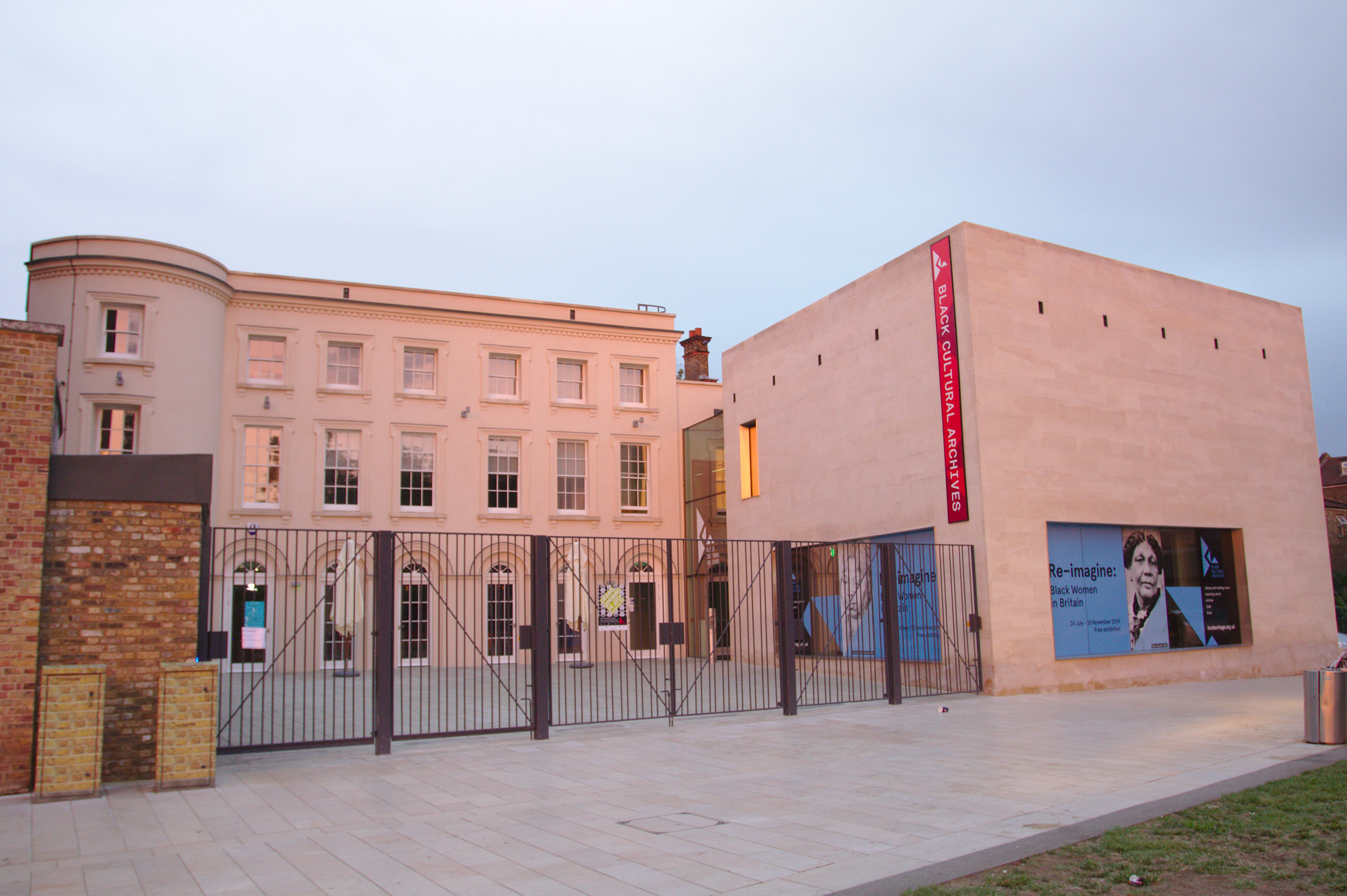
- Established: 1981; 45 years ago
- Location: 1 Windrush Square, Brixton, London, SW2 1EF
- Type: Archive
- Founder: included Len Garrison
- CEO: Wanda Wyporska
- Public transit access: Brixton
- Website: bcaheritage.org.uk

Black Cultural Archives (BCA) is an archive and heritage centre in Brixton, London, devoted to the histories of people of African and Caribbean descent in Britain. The BCA was founded in 1981 by educationalist and historian Len Garrison and others. BCA's mission is to record, preserve and celebrate the history of people of African descent in Britain. The BCA's new building in Brixton, opened in 2014, enables access to the archive collection, provides dedicated learning spaces and mounts a programme of exhibitions and events.

== History ==
In 1981, Len Garrison, Makeda Coaston and Askala Miriam joined other community activists to found the African People's Historical Monument Foundation. The Black Cultural Archives (BCA) was the organisation's first project. Both the organisation and the archives were established in response to riots earlier that year and were established to redress the under-representation of Black history and culture in Britain. The archives were first housed in a council-owned shopfront on Coldharbour Lane in Brixton. Intended to be a temporary venue, the archives remained there until 2005, when they were moved to Kennington.

In 2008, the BCA received funding from the Heritage Lottery Fund to have professional archivists catalogue the archive's collection for the first time. The success of the project led to a second successful bid to move the archives' premises back to Brixton. Through a £4 million grant from the Heritage Lottery Fund, £1 million from the London Development Agency and £910,000 from Lambeth Council, the BCA moved into Raleigh Hall, a formerly derelict Grade II-listed Georgian building at 1 Windrush Square. A site dedication ceremony took place in June 2013, and the new BCA building officially opened on 24 July 2014. Designed by architects Pringle Richards Sharratt, it was named in 2015 as "Building of the Year" in the New London Architecture awards.

On 16 February 2017, BCA received a royal visit from Charles, Prince of Wales, and the Duchess of Cornwall, during which Prince Charles praised the contribution of people from the West Indies and Africa in World War I and World War II.

Paul Reid was BCA's director from 2006 until 2019, with Arike Oke taking up the managing director appointment in February 2019.

In February 2022, Dr Yvonne Thompson was announced as new chair of the BCA's board of trustees.

In 2024, the Len Garrison Master of Arts Scholarship in Black British History was launched in conjunction with the University of Leicester.

In the summer of 2026, the first Wikipedia Edit-a-thon was held in London to help people engage with BCA and learn how to improve the representation of Black history online via editing Wikipedia. The event was oversubscribed and it is hoped more events will follow.

== Collection ==
In 2008, a two-year HLF-funded project called "Documenting the Archive" enabled the cataloguing of BCA's collections of books, objects, and archives, which "document the hidden stories and experiences of Black people either through personal and family journeys or through the rich network of Black-led community organisations", and "celebrate Black achievements alongside the strong sense of campaigning and resistance to racial inequalities." BCA's records are also accessible through an online catalogue.

== Exhibitions and projects ==
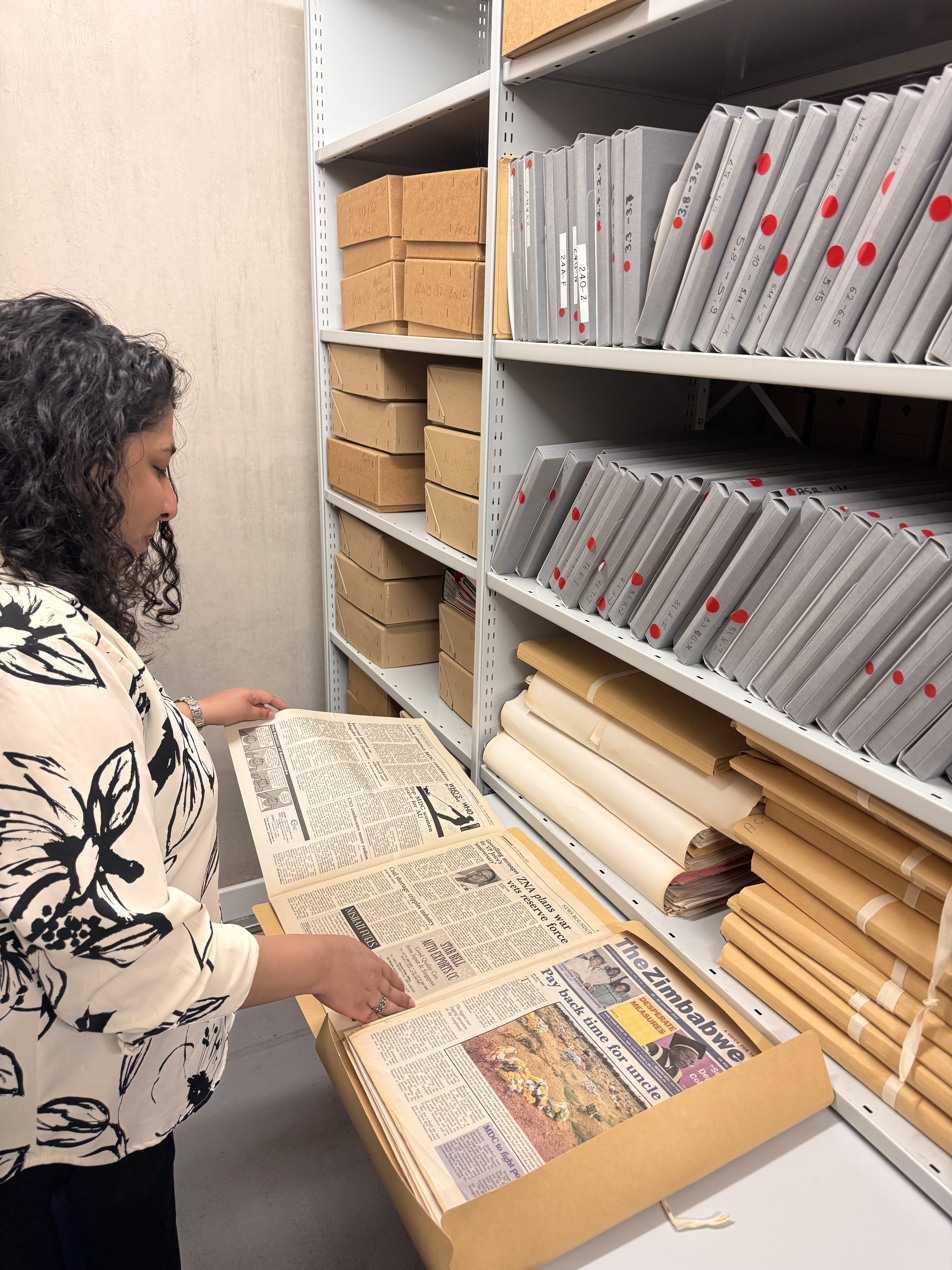
Image of archivist with archival materials in the repository

BCA's inaugural exhibition was Re-imagine: Black Women in Britain (24 July–30 November 2014), which chronicled "the often hidden histories of Britain's black foremothers", including Mary Seacole, Mary Prince, Adelaide Hall, Olive Morris, Jessica Huntley, among others. In October 2016, this exhibition was launched online as part of the Google Cultural Institute.

BCA worked over a period of years with the Victoria and Albert Museum to acquire photographs either by black photographers or that document the lives of black people in Britain, complemented by a range or oral histories. The resultant exhibition in 2015 was entitled Staying Power: Photographs of Black British Experience, 1950s – 1990 (inspired by Peter Fryer's 1984 book Staying Power: The History of Black People in Britain).

The exhibition Black Georgians: The Shock of the Familiar, from 9 October 2015 to 4 June 2016, featured the everyday lives of Black people in Britain during the Georgian period (1714–1830), with a special feature by Christy Symington on Olaudah Equiano.

Other exhibitions have included Rastafari in Motion, the story of Emperor Haile Selassie I and the Rastafari movement in Britain (14 June–10 September 2016); Black Sound (7 April 2017–17 February 2018), the story of 100 years of musical creativity, co-curated in partnership with The Champion Agency and Lloyd Bradley; and Expectations (7 August–24 October 2018), described as "the first ever photography exhibition 'takeover' at the Black Cultural Archives using photographs taken by Neil Kenlock".

BCA has a collection of archival materials, including photographs, biographies and magazines.
