= Pringle Richards Sharratt =

British architectural firm

Practice information
- Founders: John Pringle; Penny Richards; Ian Sharratt
- Founded: April 1996; 29 years ago
- Location: London, United Kingdom

Website
- prsarchitects.com

Pringle Richards Sharratt is an architectural firm that was formed in 1996 by John Pringle, Penny Richards and Ian Sharratt. Based in London, the practice has worked on public buildings, art galleries, museums, libraries, archives, university and transport buildings. Before forming PRS, John Pringle and Ian Sharratt were partners at Michael Hopkins and Partners and Penny Richards had her own practice that specialised in museum and gallery projects.

== Notable projects ==
- Winter Garden & Millennium Galleries, Sheffield (2002)
- Gallery Oldham, Oldham (2002)
- Oldham Library & Lifelong Learning Centre (2005)
- Herbert Art Gallery & Museum, Coventry (2008)
- Shrewsbury School Music School (2001)
- Pitt Rivers Museum Research Centre and Balfour Library, Oxford University (2006)
- Radcliffe Science Library, Oxford University (2007)
- Victoria and Albert Museum Grand Entrance, Glass Gallery, Contemporary Glass Gallery, Textile Reference Collection, Temporary Exhibition Galleries (1996–2006)
- Real Tennis Court, Middlesex University (1999)
- Carlisle Lane Flats (2005)
- Hull History Centre
- West Ham Bus Garage for Transport for London (2009)
- Fit out of the Palestra Building and installation of UK's largest internal Fuel Cell [(Transport For London)] (2006–10)
- Black Cultural Archives, Brixton, London (2014)

== Awards ==
2001

- RIBA (Royal Institute of British Architects) Award, Shrewsbury School Music School & Auditorium
- British Construction Industry Awards (Shortlisting), Shrewsbury School Music School & Auditorium and Millennium Galleries, Sheffield
- Wood Award (Shortlisting), Shrewsbury School Music School & Auditorium
- Shrewsbury & Atcham Design & Heritage Award, Shrewsbury School Music School & Auditorium

2002

- Civic Trust Award, Sheffield Millennium Galleries
- RIBA (Royal Institute of British Architects) Award, Gallery Oldham
- Concrete Society Award, Sheffield Millennium Galleries
- Kensington & Chelsea Environment Award Scheme, Victoria & Albert Museum
- Brick Award Commendation, Shrewsbury School Music School & Auditorium
- Manchester Civic Society Design Award, Gallery Oldham

2003

- RIBA (Royal Institute of British Architects) Award, Sheffield Millennium Galleries & Winter Garden
- Royal Fine Art Commission Trust Building of the Year Jeu d'Esprit Award, Sheffield Winter Garden
- Civic Trust Award Commendation, Shrewsbury School Music School & Auditorium
- RICS (Royal Institution of Chartered Surveyors) Pro Yorkshire Award for Design & Innovation, Sheffield Winter Garden
- British Guild of Travel Writers' Commendation, Winter Garden
- Civic Trust Green Flag Award, Sheffield Winter Garden
- Variety Club of Great Britain Best Regeneration Award, Winter Garden
- Wood Award Shortlisting, Sheffield Winter Garden
- ICE (Institution of Civil Engineers) Yorkshire Award, Highly Commended, Sheffield Winter Garden

2004

- Civic Trust Awards, Gallery Oldham & Sheffield Winter Garden
- ECSN European Award for Excellence in Concrete, Sheffield Millennium Galleries
- European Federation of Interior Landscaping Groups Gold Award, Winter Garden

2005

- Wood Award Commendation, Carlisle Lane Flats

2007

- Prime Minister's Better Public Building Award (Shortlisting), Oldham Library & Lifelong Learning Centre
- Academy of Urbanism, The Great Place Award, Winter Garden
- British Construction Industry Awards (Shortlisting), Oldham Library & Lifelong Learning Centre
- Landscape Institute Awards - President's Award, Sheffield Winter Garden
