= Cherry Groce Memorial Pavilion =

Memorial in Brixton, London

Coordinates: 51.4606°N 0.1154°W

The Memorial Pavilion in 2026

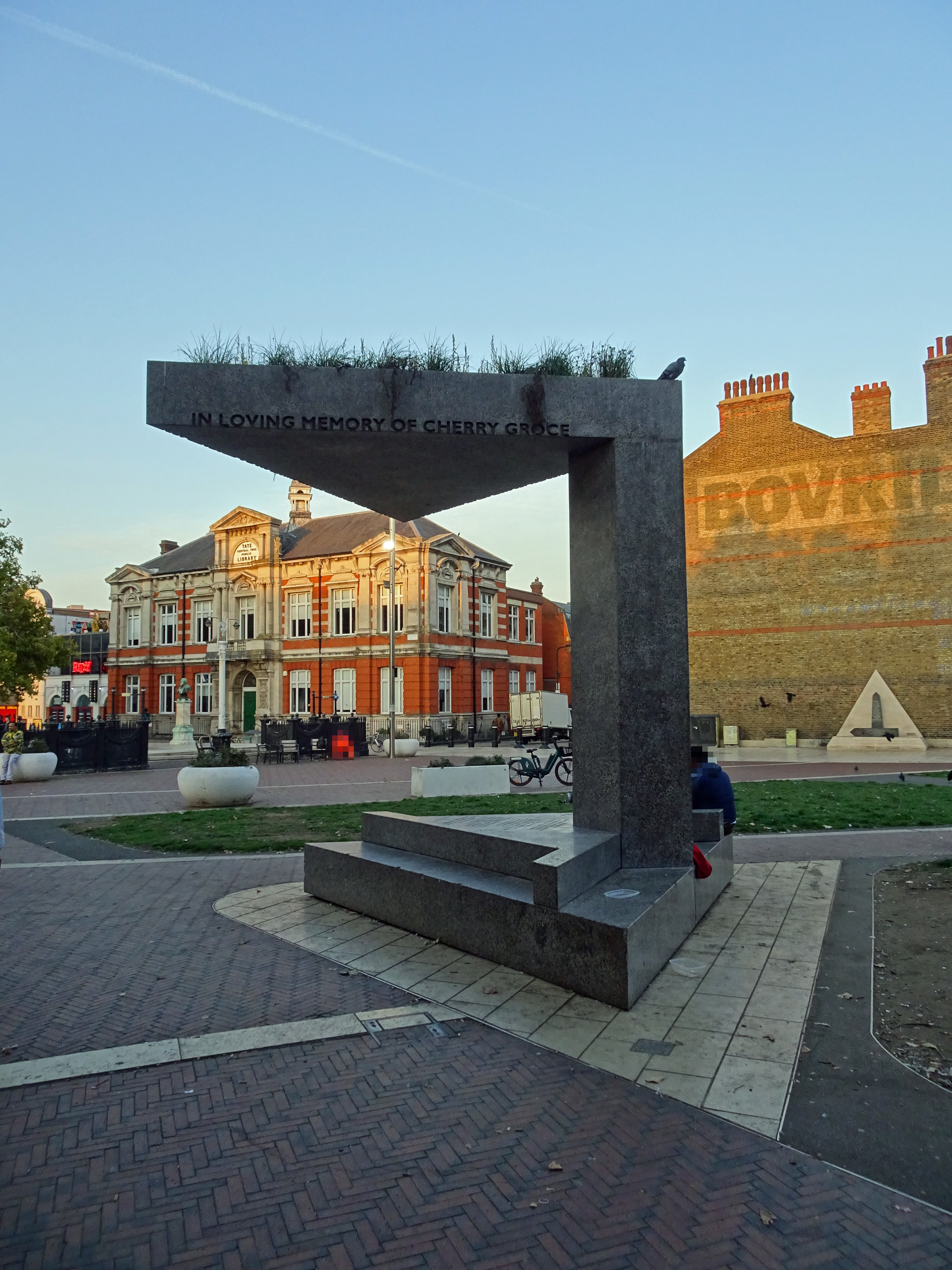
The Cherry Groce Memorial Pavilion in October 2025

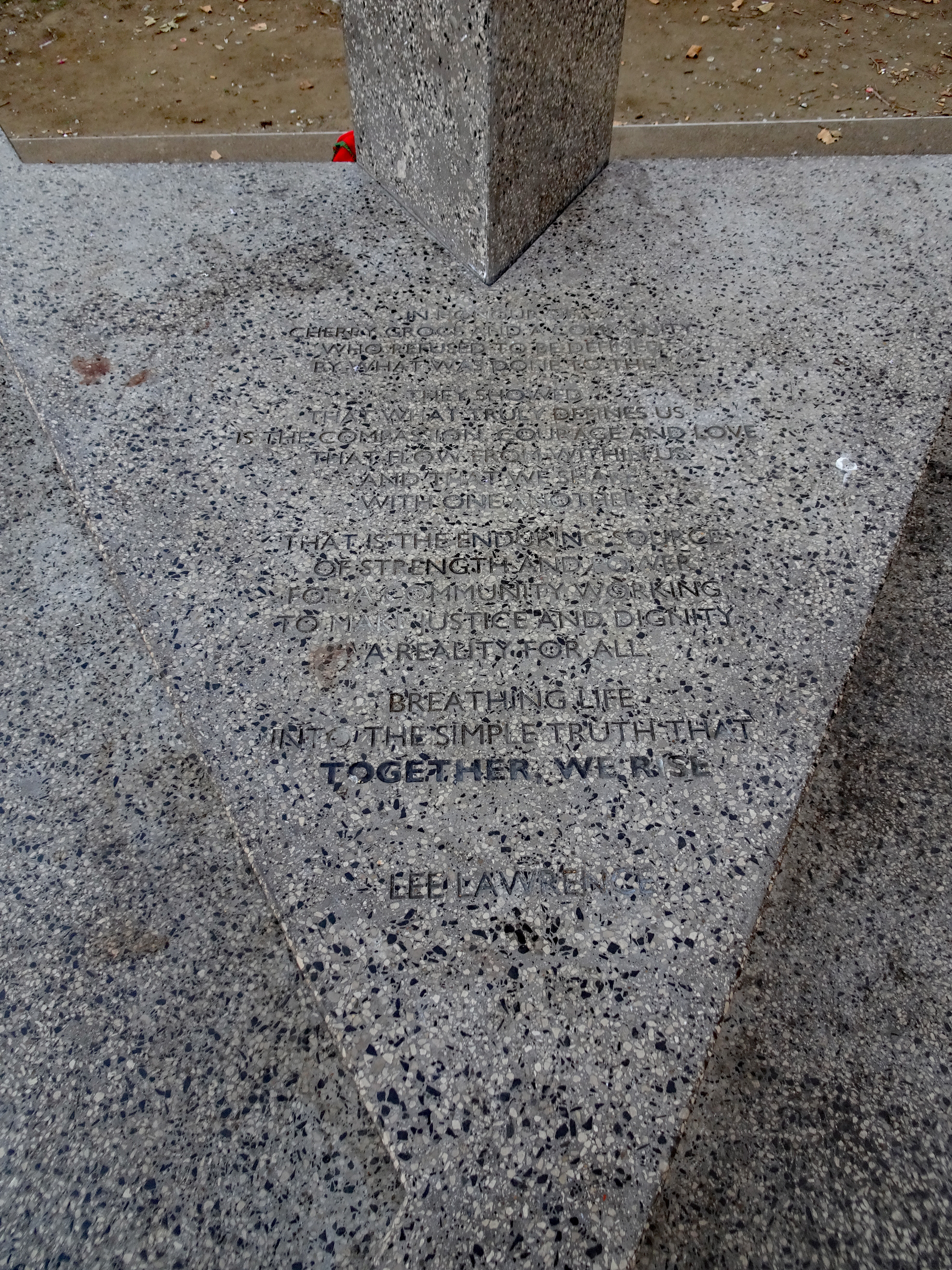
The inscription on the pavilion

The Cherry Groce Memorial Pavilion is a memorial to Dorothy "Cherry" Groce in Windrush Square, Brixton. It was designed by David Adjaye and unveiled in 2021.

The memorial was unveiled at Windrush Square on 25 April 2021. Due to COVID-19 restrictions the unveiling was broadcast online with 15 official guests. Groce was shot by a police officer in a raid in September 1985 which left her paralysed from the waist down. Police had been looking for her son in connection with an armed robbery but he was never subsequently charged. Groce's shooting led to the 1985 Brixton riot. She died in 2011. The Metropolitan Police apologised for her wrongful shooting in 2014 with a previous inquest jury concluding that eight police failures had directly led to her death.

It was designed by David Adjaye of Adjaye Associates. It was funded by Lambeth Council who worked in partnership with Adjaye Associates and Groce's family. The structural engineering firm of the memorial was AKTII. The memorial is in the form of a pavilion with a single column that supports a triangular roof. Flowers are planted upon the roof. The column is intended to be symbolic of Groce's strength and the support of her local community. The memorial has benches and is intended to be a gathering place. Adjaye was inspired by the angular forms of the landscaping of Windrush Square and the nearby Memorial to African and Caribbean Soldiers.

Groce's son, Lee Lawrence, described the memorial as "... a fitting tribute to my mother and to our community. The injustice done to my mother on 28 September 1985 and its aftermath, catalysed our community to act together relentlessly and persistently in the pursuit of justice for more than three decades. Our achievements together in that effort can inspire us to continue to work together to make justice a reality across our society".
