= Raleigh Hall =

Building in Brixton, London

Coordinates: 51°27′38″N 0°06′52″W

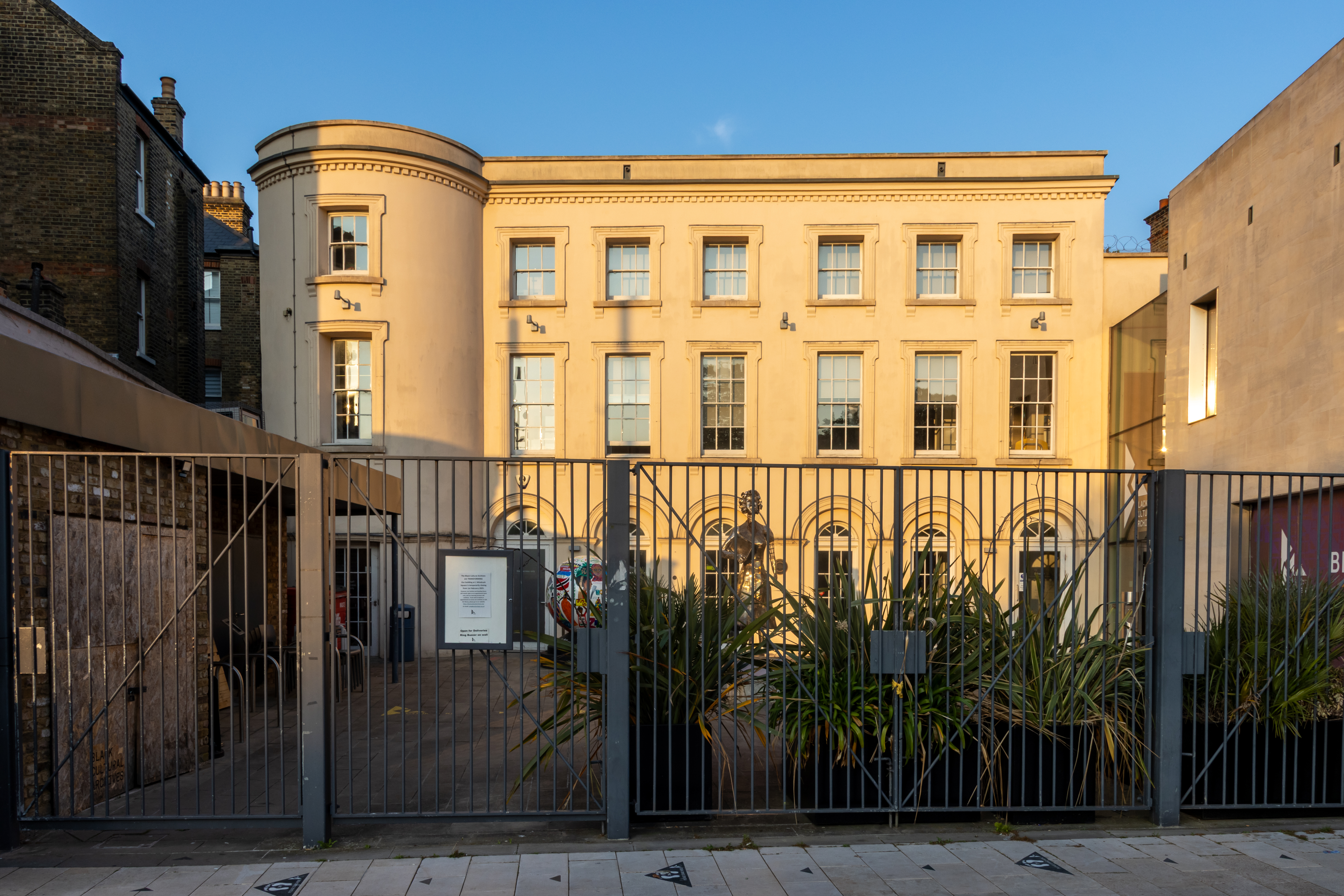
The building in 2025

Raleigh Hall is a building in Windrush Square, Brixton. It is now home to the Black Cultural Archives, after having been derelict for many years.

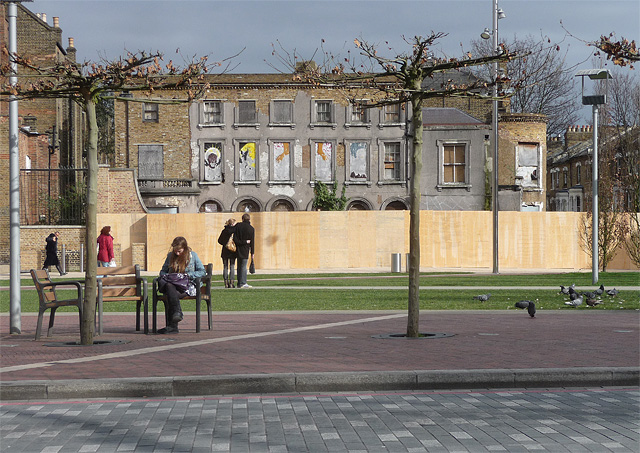
The building in 2011

The building was originally two houses built in 1824, and is a Grade II listed building.

The hall had been used by the Cinema Museum in the mid-1980s. It had also been home to Klitsa Fashions, Omegas Fashion Dress Manufacturers, Arkwrights Ltd and the Raleigh Workshop.

It was placed on the English Heritage Register of Historic Buildings at Risk in 1992.
