= Yvonne Thompson =

British business leader

Yvonne Thompson CBE, FRSA
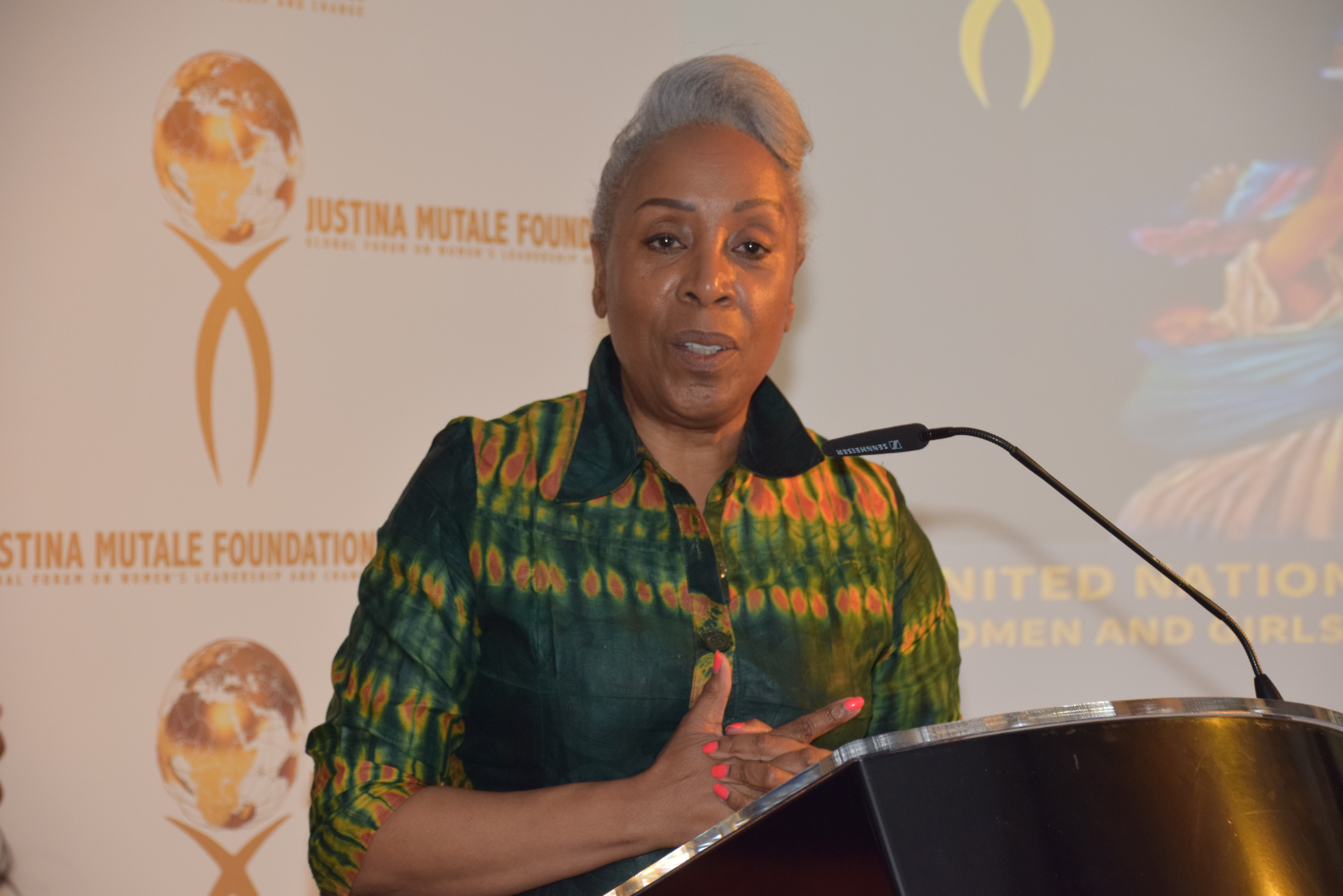
- Born: Guyana, South America
- Education: Croydon Polytechnic
- Occupation: Business leader
- Known for: Founder of the European Federation of Black Women Business Owners (EFBWBO)
- Awards: European Women Of Achievement Award
- Website: www.msyvonnethompson.com

Yvonne Thompson is a British business leader, who was a founding member of radio station Choice FM, music editor of Root magazine, managing director of marketing and PR company ASAP Communications, president of the European Federation of Black Women Business Owners. Her work has had a focus on women-owned businesses, as well as on diversity and gender equality in the work place. She is frequently referred to as "Britain's first black self-made woman millionaire". In February 2018, her appointment as chair of The Radio Academy was announced.

== Background ==
Born in Guyana, South America, Yvonne Thompson immigrated to Britain in 1961. She originally wanted to be a medical doctor, and then a nurse, leaving school at 16 and taking a pre-nursing course at Croydon Polytechnic – she has explained this change of ambition by saying: "[A]s I grew older I realised I didn't see many non-white doctors; they were all male and pale."

Her jobs were working at NatWest bank and, at the age of 20, being PA to the contracts manager at Phonogram Records, which led to employment at Warner Brothers and at CBS, although being passed over for promotion three times caused her to resign. She went on to found in 1983 her own public relations company, ASAP Communications, pioneering the provision of bespoke PR services for black music artists.

She wrote for the UK's first black glossy magazine Root and became a founding member and director of the UK's first Black music radio station Choice FM (started in 1990 and eventually rebranded as Capital XTRA).

Thompson subsequently founded, in 1996, the European Federation of Black Women Business Owners (EFBWBO).

In 2014, she published her first book, 7 Traits of Highly Successful Women on Boards, in which she says she is "laying down a challenge to society, to provide a level playing field so that our young women with potential to be future leaders, can be the confident citizens of Europe, including possibility of being on the Board of a national or international corporation, and not be excluded like so many women of this generation are, purely on the grounds of her gender".

Thompson has worked with many public bodies and chaired or served on the boards of numerous organisations, including government agencies. In February 2018, she was appointed chair of The Radio Academy.

In 2022, she was named as Chair of the Black Cultural Archives.

== Awards and recognition ==
Yvonne Thompson received the European Women Of Achievement Award in 2001.

In the 2003 Queen's Birthday Honours, Thompson was appointed Commander of the Order of the British Empire (CBE) for Services to Black and Ethnic Minority Business.

In 2005, she received an honorary doctorate from London Metropolitan University for services to small business, and mass communications, and has also been awarded an honorary degree from Plymouth University. Other honours accorded her include the declaration by the Mayor of Houston, Texas, of 4 January 2004 as "Yvonne Thomson Day".
