= The Cinema News and Property Gazette =

20th-century British newspaper

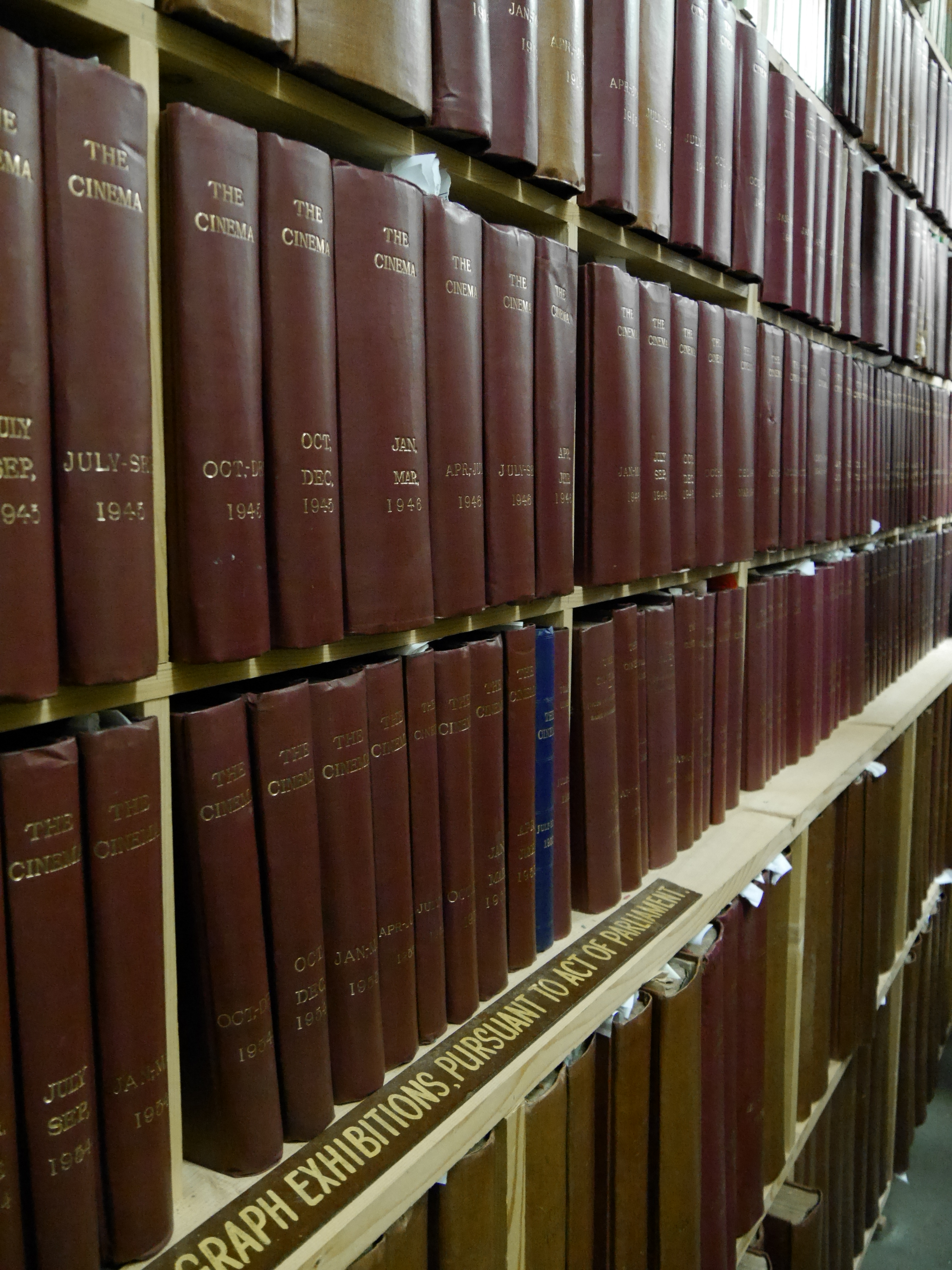
Bound volumes of The Cinema News and Property Gazette, Cinema Museum (London)

The Cinema News and Property Gazette was a trade newspaper catering to the British film industry from 1912 until 1975.
