= Windrush Square =

Public space in Brixton, South London, England

Coordinates: 51.4606°N 0.1152°W

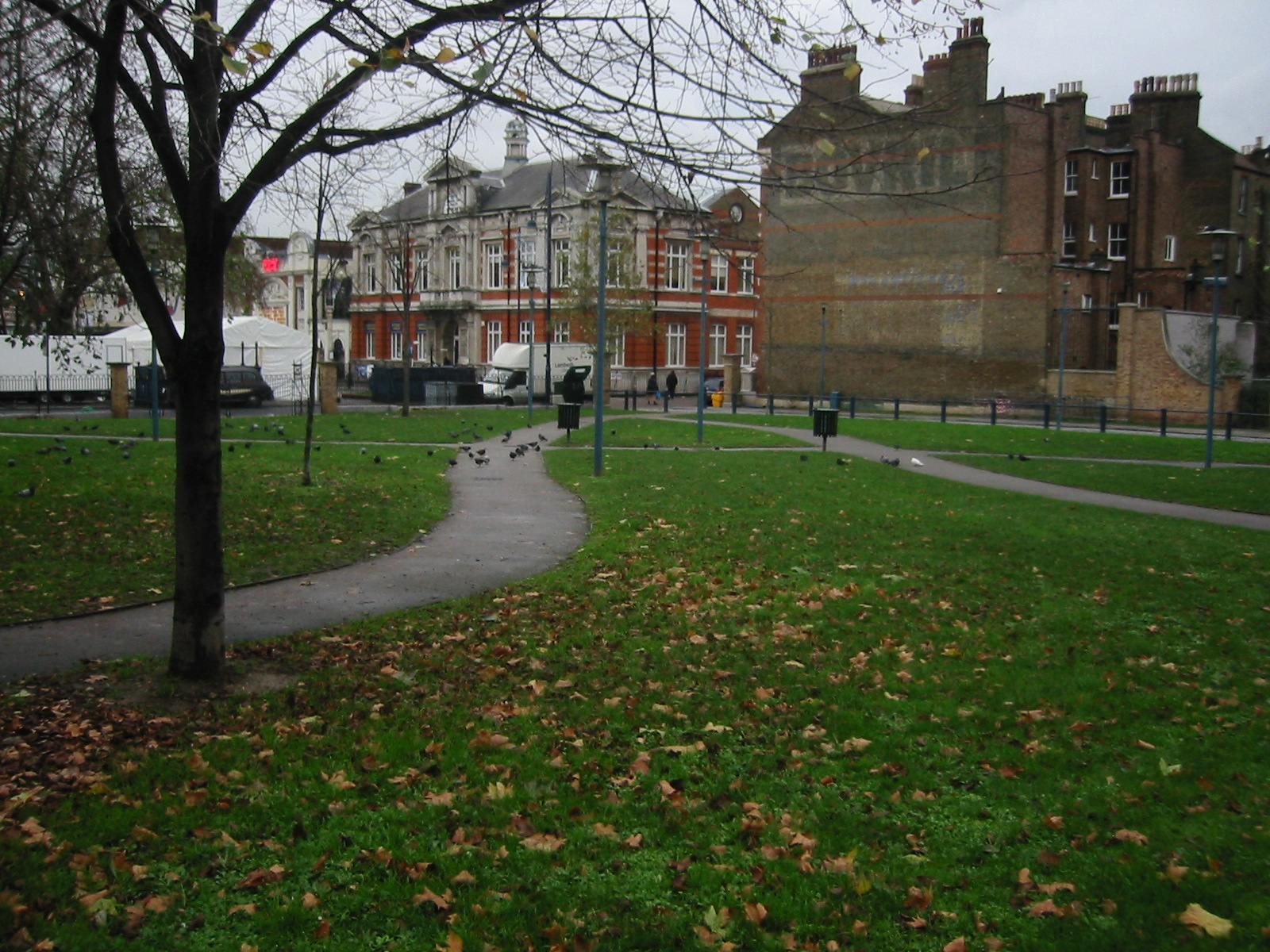
Windrush Square, London (2006)

Windrush Square (often referred to by its original name, Brixton Oval) is an open public space in the centre of Brixton, South London, occupying an area in front of the Brixton Tate Library.

== History ==
Brixton Oval was private open land, that had formed part of Rush Common and could not be built upon. There were complaints about advertising hoardings that were installed around it in 1900. Lambeth Council attempted to buy the land in 1901 but the price of £3,000 (equivalent to £318,810 in 2025) was considered excessive. In 1904, it was purchased by Amy Tate for £3,250 (equivalent to £341,664 in 2025) and was gifted to Lambeth Council to be laid out as a public garden. The Tate Library Garden was formally opened by Amy Tate on 11 October 1905, featuring a bronze memorial bust of Henry Tate that was made by Thomas Brock.

It was given its current name in 1998. The square was renamed to recognise the important contribution of the African Caribbean community to the area, marking the 50th anniversary of the arrival of the HMT Empire Windrush. It was the Windrush that in 1948 brought to the United Kingdom from Jamaica the largest group thus far of post-war West Indian migrants (over 800 declared their last residence in the Caribbean), 236 of whom had no abode on arrival and were temporarily housed in the deep-level air raid shelter in Clapham Common. Some 1.7 mile away, at the western end of Coldharbour Lane in Brixton, was the nearest employment exchange to the shelter. Many of these migrants eventually found accommodation in the area.

== Features ==
Windrush Square is a pedestrianised open space. The land is protected from development as it was formerly part of Rush Common.

The Black Cultural Archives is now housed at 1 Windrush Square in a Grade II-listed Georgian building, the former Raleigh Hall.

On 22 June 2017, the African and Caribbean War Memorial – devised by the Nubian Jak Community Trust as the United Kingdom's first national memorial to African and Caribbean service personnel who fought in the First and Second World Wars – was unveiled in Windrush Square.

The Cherry Groce Memorial Pavilion was unveiled on the square in April 2021. It was designed by Adjaye Associates. It commemorates Dorothy "Cherry" Groce who was shot and paralysed by a police officer during a raid on her home in 1985. The events led to the 1985 Brixton riot.
